= 889 Broadway =

Historic building in Manhattan, New York

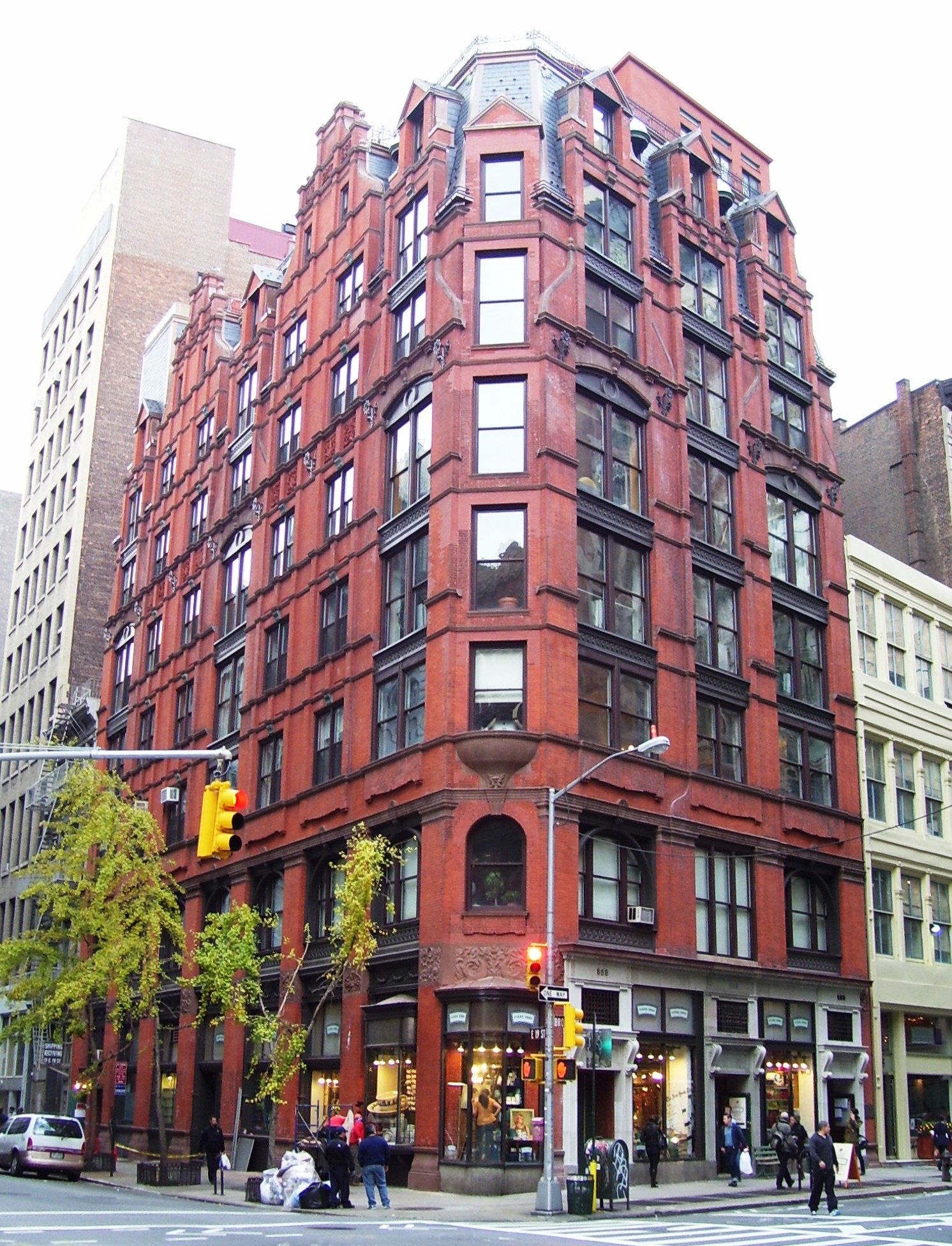
- Seen from the southeast corner of Broadway and 19th Street
- Interactive map of the 889 Broadway area
- Alternative names: Gorham Building, Gorham Manufacturing Company Building

General information
- Architectural style: Queen Anne
- Location: Flatiron District, New York City, United States
- Coordinates: 40.7387°N 73.9901°W
- Named for: Gorham Manufacturing Company
- Groundbreaking: 1883
- Opened: May 1884

Technical details
- Floor count: 8

Design and construction
- Architect: Edward Hale Kendall

New York City Landmark
- Designated: June 19, 1984
- Reference no.: 1227

889 Broadway, also known as the Gorham Manufacturing Company Building, is a Queen Anne style building located at Broadway and East 19th Street in the Flatiron District of Manhattan in New York City, within the Ladies' Mile Historic District. Built in 1883–1884, it was designed by Edward Hale Kendall.

889 Broadway served as a retail store for the Gorham Manufacturing Company, a major manufacturer of sterling and silverplate, until 1905. The stories above the second floor were originally rented as bachelor apartments until Gorham expanded into the rest of the building. The building was subsequently converted into lofts and offices in 1913. In 1977, the original layout was restored, and in 1984, the building was designated an official city landmark by the New York City Landmarks Preservation Commission.

== History ==
=== Context ===
The site was initially owned by members of the wealthy Goelet family, originally from the Netherlands. The Goelet family had a long tradition of investing in New York City real estate. Peter Goelet, known for "tenaciously" holding on to all real-estate that he owned, was the first to buy land in the area in the 1840s. Peter purchased three lots along Broadway's eastern sidewalk, bounded by 19th Street to the south and 20th Street to the north, where the adjacent 900 Broadway is now located. Another family member, Almy Goelet, purchased the site of the Gorham Building across the street in 1845-1846. During the 1850s, that site contained a hardware store and a marble dealer. Upon Peter's death in 1879, ownership of his land passed to his nephews Robert and Ogden. By the 1880s, the Goelets owned most of the land from 19th to 20th Streets on both sides of Broadway.

While Broadway below 14th Street, at Union Square, was known as an upscale residential district, the section to the north did not see similar development, and the most opulent residence on this stretch would be Peter Goelet's residence on 19th Street, which stood until 1897. However, starting in the 1870s, the section of Broadway from Union Square to 23rd Street was turned into what later became dubbed as the "Ladies Mile", occupied by stores such as Tiffany & Co. (at 15 Union Square West), Lord & Taylor (at 901 Broadway), and Arnold Constable & Company (at 881-887 Broadway). Any residential usages were quickly supplanted by commercial ventures, which at the time were quickly expanding along this section of Broadway.

=== Use ===
Upon acquiring their uncles' land, Robert and Ogden Goelet wished to build a new structure, hiring Edward Hale Kendall to design a new building on the northwest corner of 20th Street and Broadway. The Goelet brothers originally intended their new development as a mixed-use building, with the first and second floors used for retail and the rest intended for residential use. Kendall, who had used different architectural styles for his previous buildings, might have picked the Queen Anne style as being more suitable for a structure that contained apartments over retail space. Construction started in June 1883 and the building was completed a year later.

The retail space was rented out by the Gorham Manufacturing Company, a silver-making company of Providence, Rhode Island, which opened its New York City store in 889 Broadway's first and second floors in May 1884. Soon after, 889 Broadway became known as the Gorham Manufacturing Company Building. The upstairs apartments were used as the "bachelor quarters", which lacked kitchens. In 1888, Gorham expanded its commercial space; the third floor was converted to a silver plate-engraving room and the fourth floor became a salesroom. By 1893, Gorham's commercial operation expanded into the rest of the building.

By the first decade of the 20th century, factories and lofts were opening in the area around 889 Broadway. Furthermore, stores on Ladies' Mile began to move further north into larger space. B. Altman and Company moved in 1906 to 355-371 Fifth Avenue, between 34th and 35th Streets, diagonally across from the present Empire State Building. The Gorham Company moved later the same year to 390 Fifth Avenue, a block north at 36th Street, which had opened in September 1905.

The building was converted by John H. Duncan in 1912 into lofts and offices, removing a corner tower and adding roof dormers. Ten years later, the upper floors were zoned to allowed light industrial use as well. In 1977, it was restored to its original configuration, with a retail store on the ground floor and the remaining floors made into cooperative apartments. The building was designated a New York City landmark on June 19, 1984, and was designated again as part of the Ladies' Mile Historic District in 1989. Around 1988, the retail space was occupied by Fishs Eddy, a dinnerware retailer. Fishs Eddy remains in the building as of 2019.

== Architecture ==
889 Broadway is an eight-story building located at the northwest corner of 19th Street and Broadway. It was designed by Edward Hale Kendall in the Queen Anne style. The building is unusual in that it is one of relatively few commercial buildings in the Queen Anne style within New York City. First used in the United States in the 1860s, the Queen Anne style included such features as asymmetric brick facades, stone decorative trim, elaborate ornamentation, and roofs interrupted by dormers or gables.

=== Facade ===
Located on a trapezoidal lot, 889 Broadway contains a facade of brick with sandstone trim. The building measures 55 feet (17 m) wide on Broadway, with three vertical bays along that facade, and 109 feet (33 m) along 19th Street, with seven bays. The northern facade is 92 feet (28 m) wide and the western facade is 53 feet (16 m) wide; neither facade contains ornamentation. The bays are generally divided by vertical piers made of brick. At the corner of Broadway and 19th Street, there was originally a tower topped by a cupola. This was later replaced by a chamfered corner containing window openings.

The lowest two stories comprise the base of the building and were originally designed for commercial tenancy. Originally, the vertical bays within the base were separated by carved piers in relief. Along Broadway, the original three-bay facade on the first floor was replaced in 1912 with the current five-bay-wide storefront, made of limestone. On the second story, the windows are made of arched frames inside rectangular openings, except for the center bay on Broadway, where there are three sash windows. A gabled canopy was also located above the entrance to the Gorham store, above the center bay on Broadway. Between the second and third floors is a pair of stone string courses.

Above the lower two stories, the window bays on the Broadway facade contain similarly-designed sash windows, except that the center bay is narrower. . A string course runs between the fifth and sixth floors, wrapping around to the 19th Street facade. On the 19th Street facade, all of the window bays contain one sash window per floor on the third through seventh floors. The columns of windows are grouped into two patterns. Going from Broadway, the first, fourth, and seventh columns of windows are identical to each other and contain black iron window frames. The second/third and fifth/sixth columns of windows are paired, with brick-and-stone bands separating each window both horizontally and vertically. Notable features of both facades include segmental arches above the fifth floor of several bays, as well as carved scroll motifs and slightly projecting piers.

889 Broadway is topped by a steep slate roof. Dormer windows were installed on the roof, at the eighth story, in 1912. A penthouse was built on the northern half of the roof in 1977. The dormers are located above all three window bays along Broadway, and above the first, fourth, and seventh window bays along 19th Street.
