= Edward F. Caldwell & Co. =

Edward F. Caldwell & Co., of New York City, was one of the premier designers and manufacturers of electric light fixtures and decorative metalwork from the late 19th to the mid-20th centuries. Founded in 1895 by Edward F. Caldwell (1851–1914) and Victor F. von Lossberg (1853–1942), the firm left a legacy of custom designed and finely-made, metal gates, lanterns, chandeliers, ceiling and wall fixtures, floor and table lamps, and other decorative objects that can be found today in many metropolitan area churches, public buildings, offices, clubs, and residences including, the White House (1902 renovation), St. Patrick's Cathedral, New York, New York Public Library, and Rockefeller Center.

== Edward F. Caldwell (1851-1914) ==
Edward F. Caldwell, a portrait painter originally from Waterville, New York, became part of an active community of designers in New York City during the early 1880s. By the end of that decade and into the 1890s, Caldwell worked for, and later became chief designer and vice president of, the Archer & Pancoast Manufacturing Company of New York, top designers of gas lighting fixtures. At this time, due to Thomas Edison's advances in developing the electric light bulb, Archer & Pancoast began manufacturing fixtures using this new technology.

Caldwell faced the challenge of mastering an understanding of electric light and adapting electric fixtures to traditional ornamental esthetics that were acceptable to the late 19th century American public. While at Archer & Pancoast, Caldwell oversaw three major commissions for McKim, Mead, and White, as well as commissions for the New York State Building at the 1893 World's Columbian Exposition (Chicago), The [Metropolitan Club] of New York City, and the Boston Public Library.

Through these projects, Caldwell became a friend of Stanford White (1853–1906), a young architect who saw the importance of electric illumination for designing future interiors and buildings. He understood that technological advances of slender tubing, small electric bulbs, concealed wiring, modern switch units, and low voltage current linked to small sockets would allow fixtures to take new and diverse forms, sharing decorative as well as utilitarian functions. White encouraged Caldwell to focus solely on designing electric light fixtures.

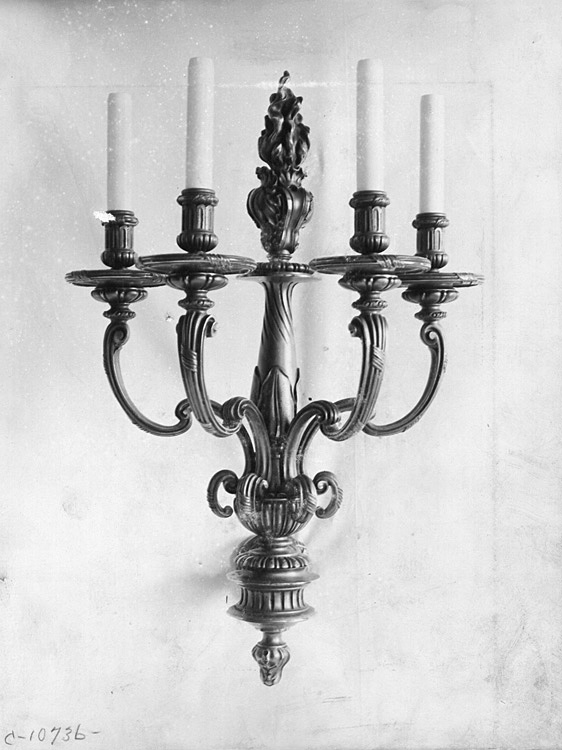
A chandelier

In 1895, Caldwell established the firm Edward F. Caldwell & Co., Inc. of New York with Victor von Lossberg at 31 East 17th Street. Von Lossberg, a designer and draftsman Caldwell had worked with at Archer & Pancoast, was a native of Latvia who was raised in Russia and studied design in Germany. Caldwell and von Lossberg brought skilled artisans from Europe to New York to work for the firm. They frequently traveled to Europe studying and importing historic objects for use as inspiration in the production of their electric light fixtures.

In 1901, they established their own foundry at 36-40 West 15th Street, along with their showrooms and offices. They quickly became known for producing lighting fixtures and metalwork objects in bronze, iron, silver, brass, and copper. The firm attracted commissions from some of the most prominent architects of the period including McKim, Mead & White, Carrere & Hastings, Cram, Goodhue & Ferguson, and Cass Gilbert.

Caldwell & Co. produced a wide variety of objects based on historic styles since many of their wealthy and established clientele preferred traditional designs. They showed clients photographs and actual historic examples of French, Italian and English forms that could be adapted as electric light fixtures and that would fit esthetically into traditional or period interiors.

The firm also worked closely with the architects, interior decorators and other subcontractors to coordinate the aesthetic unity of a project, using their extensive photo archive to inspire new designs. A watercolor or colored pencil presentation drawing was then created for review by designer and client before the piece was put into production. After production, pieces were often photographed to be added to the company's extensive photo archive. The success of the Caldwell firm was due to extensive variety of historic patterns at hand, which could be effectively incorporated into electric fixtures to enhance the beauty of an interior.

Under Von Lossberg, the company created more original designs rather than strictly duplicating antiques that had been a standard for the firm previously. Lighting and desk accessories now contained intricate gilding and vitreous enamel work. In the 1920s, the firm also explored more contemporary designs such as Art Deco styles for lights at Radio City Music Hall and the Waldorf-Astoria Hotel.

With a staff that numbered more than 1,000 in the early decades of the 20th century, they also had the ability to take on large commissions. As a result, they landed many of the biggest jobs of the day, including new churches, train stations, state capitols, residences and other public buildings throughout the country.

The firm continued under Victor von Lossberg after Edward Caldwell died in October 1914. Edward T. Caldwell, grandson of the founder, took over the firm when von Lossberg retired in 1938. Caldwell & Co. then produced more standardized fixtures and fluorescent lamps until 1956, when it was liquidated by the Internal Revenue Service. The company reorganized as E.T. Caldwell Lighting but closed permanently due to financial problems in 1959.

Much of their work can still be seen today throughout the country and even abroad. The Cooper-Hewitt Museum Library includes an E. F. Caldwell & Co. Collection with more than 50,000 images, of which roughly 37,000 are black-and-white photographs and approximately 13,000 are original design drawings of lighting fixtures and other metal objects produced by the company from the late 19th to the mid-20th century.

== Selected Caldwell commissions ==
- Frederick W. Vanderbilt house, Hyde Park, New York (1895–1899)
- University Club of New York, New York City (1899)
- Philip Lehman residence, New York City (1900)
- Andrew Carnegie residence, New York City (1900–1902)
- Flatiron Building, New York City (1900–1902)
- White House, Washington D.C., renovations (1902)
- St. Patrick's Cathedral, New York, New York City (1903)
- John Pierpont Morgan residence, New York City (1904)
- Harvard Club of New York City, New York City (1905)
- Harmonie Club, New York City (1905)
- Home Club, New York City (1906)
- The Belnord Apartments, New York City (1908)
- New York Public Library, New York City (1908)
- Henry Clay Frick residence, New York City (1909)
- New Theatre a.k.a. Park Theatre (Manhattan), New York City (1909)
- John Jacob Astor III residence (1910)
- Saint Thomas Church (New York City) and Parish House, New York City(1910–1913)
- Green-Wood Mortuary Chapel, Brooklyn, (1911)
- Reynolda House in Winston-Salem, North Carolina (1912–1917)
- Barclay-Vesey Building, New York City (1923)
- The Rosen House, Caramoor Center for Music and the Arts Inc., Katonah, New York, for Walter T. Rosen.
- Bank of Manhattan, New York City (1929–1930)
- Waldorf-Astoria Hotel, New York City (1931)
- Radio City Music Hall, New York City (1932)
- Rockefeller Center, New York City (1932)
- St. Paul's Chapel, New York City (1904-1907)
- Glensheen, Duluth, Minnesota (1908)

== Notes ==
St. Sophia Greek Orthodox Cathedral, Miami Florida (1950) (ref: The Miami Daily News, July 22, 1950, article on the Cathedral's architect Christopher Kantianis)
