= Sohmer Piano Building =

Residential building in Manhattan, New York

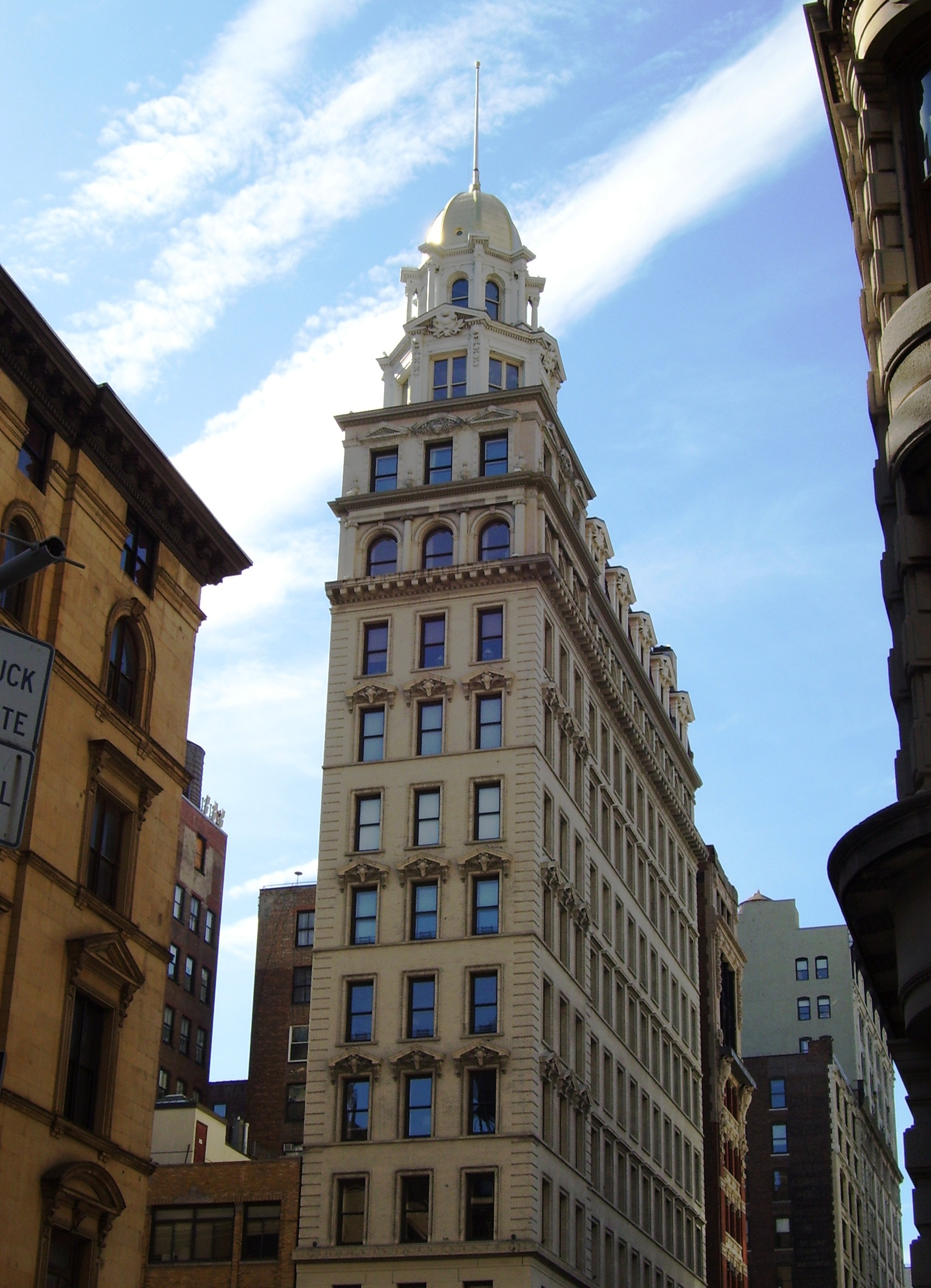
- Sohmer Piano Building
- Interactive map of the Sohmer Piano Building area

General information
- Status: Completed
- Type: residential condominiums
- Location: 170 Fifth Avenue at 22nd Street; Manhattan, New York City
- Coordinates: 40°44′27″N 73°59′25″W
- Estimated completion: 1898

Technical details
- Floor count: 13

Design and construction
- Architect: Robert Maynicke

The Sohmer Piano Building, or Sohmer Building, is a Neo-classical Beaux-Arts building located at 170 Fifth Avenue at East 22nd Street, in the Flatiron District neighborhood of the New York City borough of Manhattan, diagonally southwest of the Flatiron Building. Designed by Robert Maynicke as a store-and-loft building for real-estate developer Henry Corn, and built in 1897-98 it is easily recognizable by its gold dome, which sits on top of a 2-story octagonal cupola.

The building is located in within the Ladies' Mile Historic District, and, according to the New York City Landmarks Preservation Commission, is "characteristic of the later development phase of the District". It was named for the Sohmer Piano Company, which had its offices and showroom there early in the building's history. Other tenants included architects, publishers, and merchants of leather, hats, perfume and upholstery. It was converted to residential condominium apartments in the early 21st century, and its architectural features were restored between 2002 and 2005 by Bone / Levine Architects.
