= Robert Maynicke =

American architect (1849–1913)

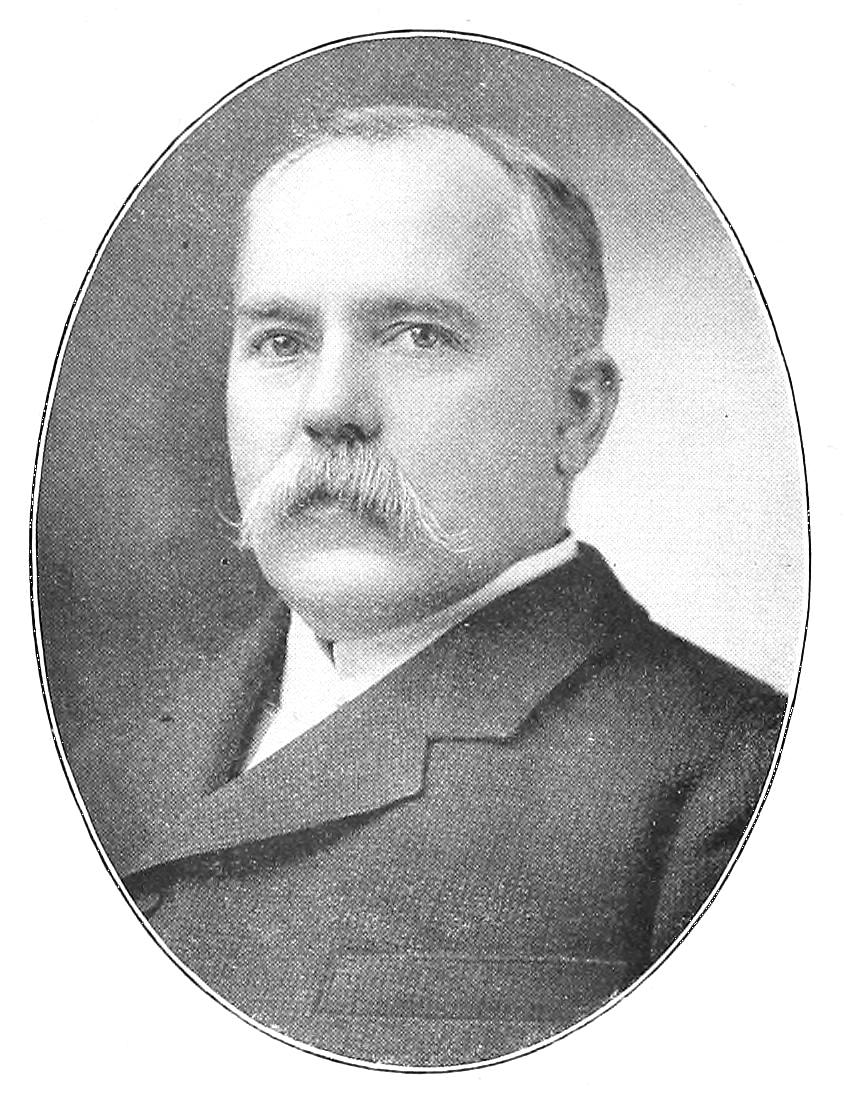
- Robert Maynicke, c.1899
- Born: 1849; Germany
- Died: September 30, 1913 (aged 63–64); Bedford Hills, New York
- Occupation: Architect
- Awards: Fellow of the American Institute of Architects (1910)
- Practice: Robert Maynicke; Maynicke & Franke

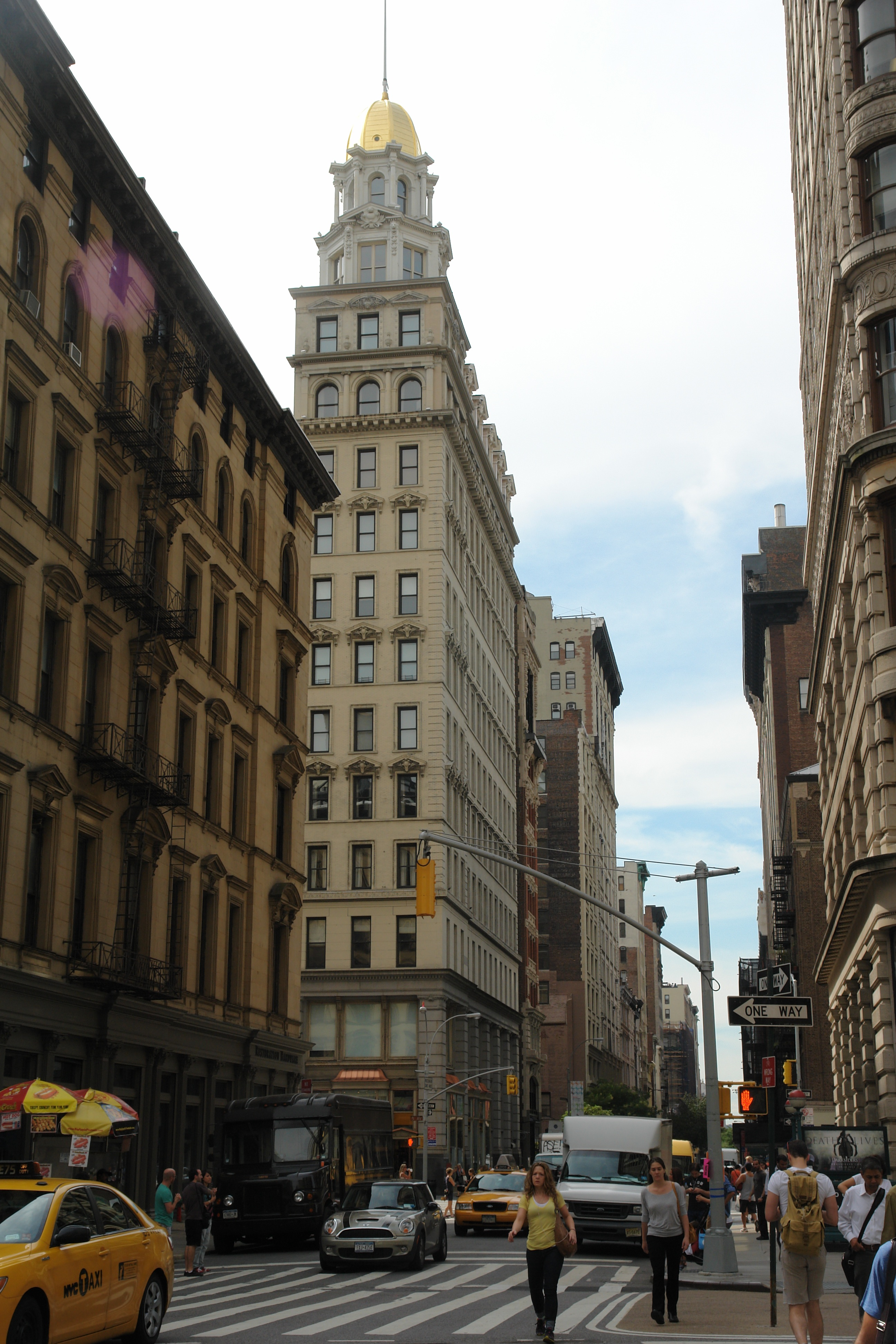
The Sohmer Piano Building in New York City, completed in 1897.

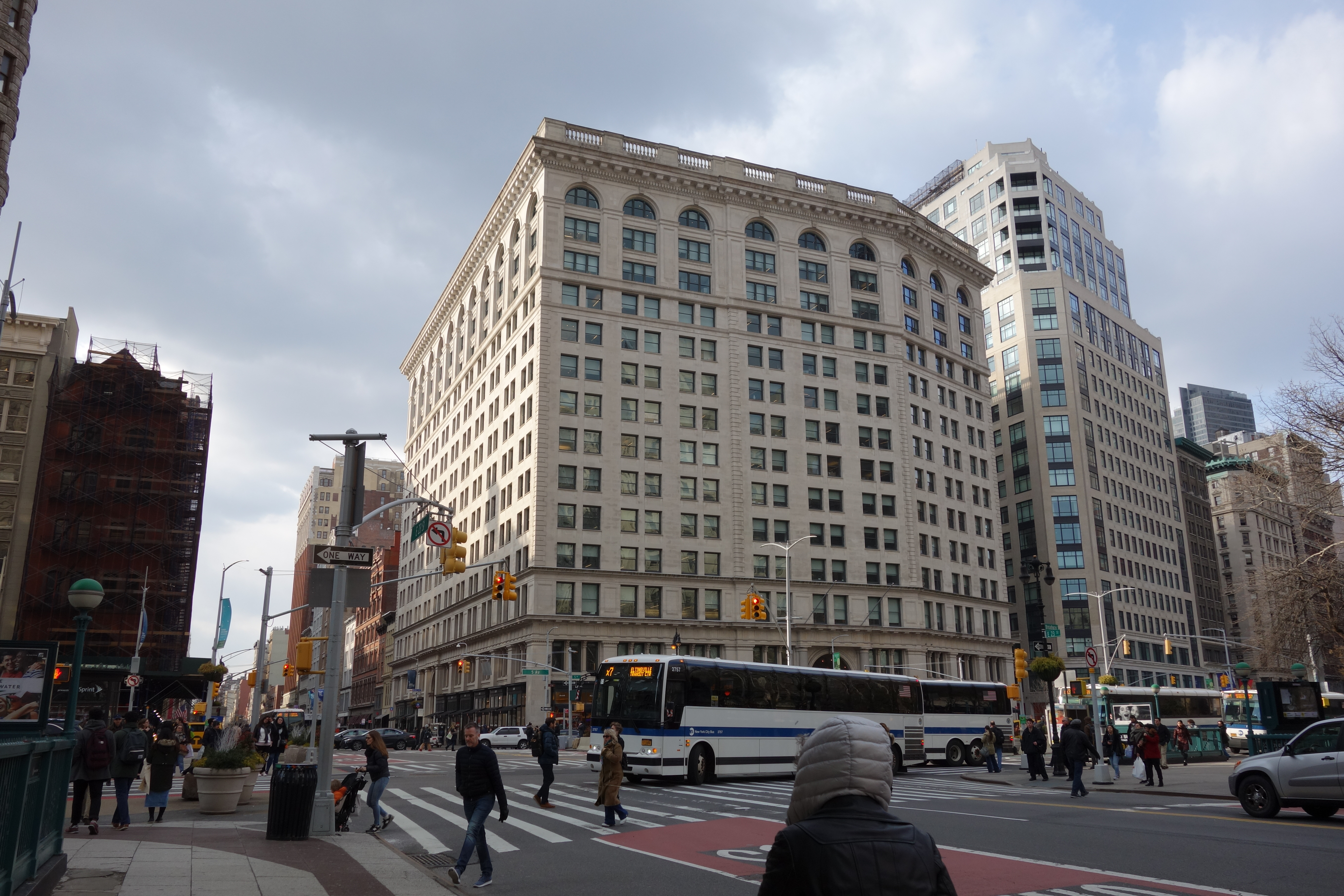
The Fifth Avenue Building in New York City, completed in 1909.

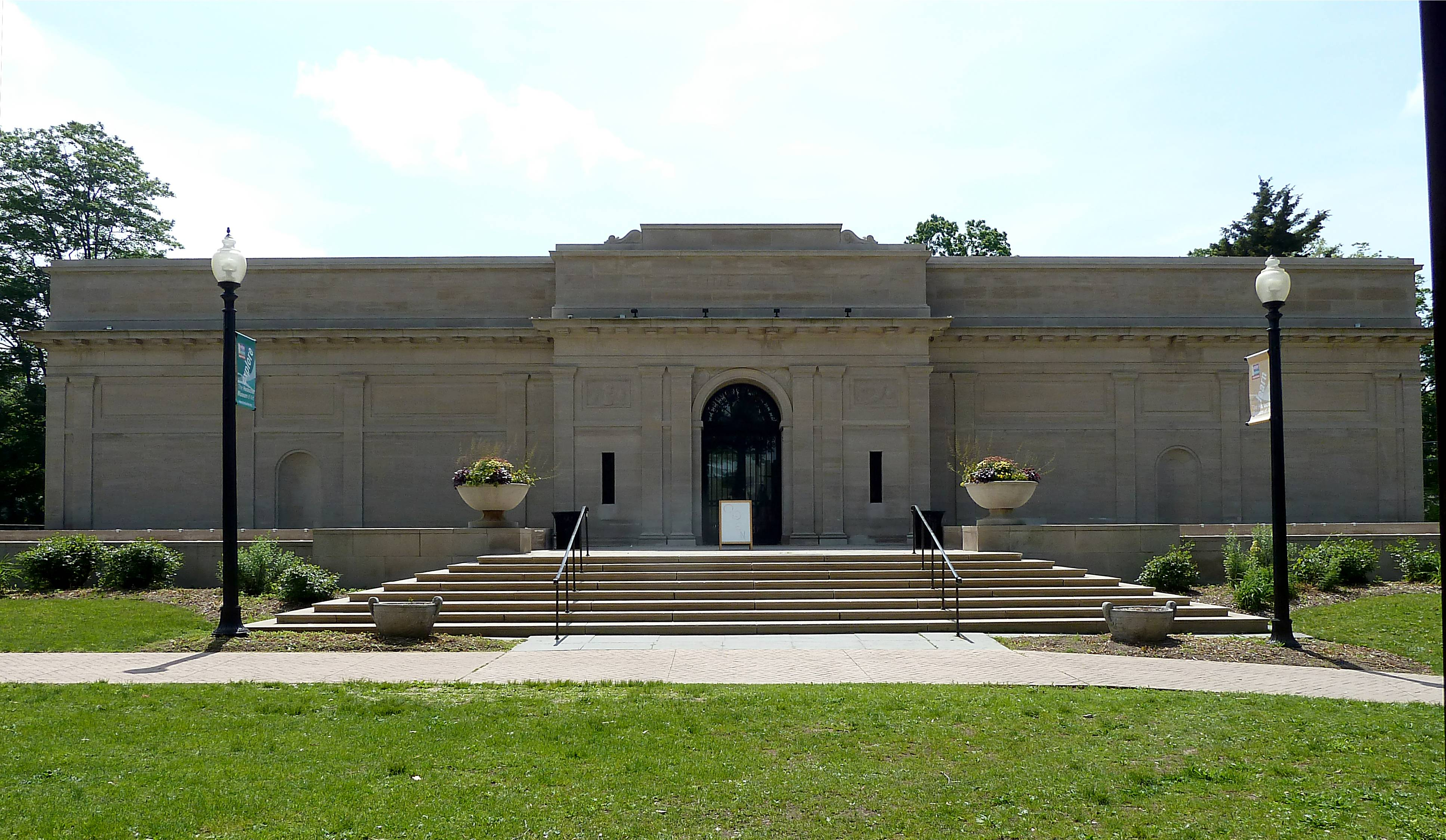
The Heckscher Museum of Art in Huntington, New York, completed in 1920.

Robert Maynicke FAIA (1849–1913) was an American architect. At his death, the New York Times called him "a pioneer in the building of modern loft buildings."

== Life and career ==
Robert Maynicke was born in Germany in 1849, coming to New York with his family as an infant. He attended the city's public schools, and received his initial architectural training in the Free Night School of Science and Art of the Cooper Union. After his 1869 graduation, he entered the office of George B. Post, architect of many early skyscrapers. In 1871 he was Post's representative in Troy, where he supervised construction of the Troy Savings Bank Building and Music Hall. He remained in Troy until construction was completed in 1875. He eventually rose to the position of Post's chief assistant, supervising all work in the office.

After working in Post's office for some twenty-five years, Maynicke initiated his own practice in 1895, making a specialty of commercial loft buildings. In January, 1905 he formed a partnership with the Beaux-Arts trained architect Julius Franke (1868-1936), whom he had first met in the office of Post. Maynicke & Franke kept their offices at 25 Madison Square South. After Maynicke's death in 1913, Franke continued to practice under the name of Maynicke & Franke until his retirement in 1926.

Both Maynicke and Franke joined the American Institute of Architects in 1908, and Maynicke was elected a fellow in 1910.

He died at his home, Cedarknoll, in Bedford Hills, New York on September 30, 1913, at the age of 69.

The noted Cincinnati architect Rudolph Tietig worked in his office at the turn of the century. For some time William H. Gompert was also a member of the office.

== Architectural works ==
The work of Maynicke and Maynicke & Franke was extensive. In 1925, towards the end of his career, Franke stated that he had calculated that the floor area of buildings completed by Maynicke and Maynicke & Franke would be equal to the area of Lower Manhattan from the Battery to Cortlandt Street.

Some important works in New York include: the Guggenheimer Building (1895), the Sohmer Piano Building (1897), the Germania Bank Building (1898, designated NYC landmark 2005), the Yorkville Bank Building (1905, designated NYC landmark 2012) and the Fifth Avenue Building (1909). They were also responsible for extensions to the New York Times Building (1903, designated NYC landmark 1999) and the Goelet Building (1905). Outside of New York City, Maynicke was responsible for the building of the First National Bank of Key West, Florida, completed in 1897.

After Maynicke's death, Franke maintained the firm's specialties. In addition to continuing commercial work, Maynicke & Franke was also responsible for the design of the Heckscher Museum of Art in Huntington, New York, opened in Heckscher Park in 1920. In 1921, for the same client, Franke also designed the Children's Building of the Heckscher Foundation for Children on Fifth Avenue. Among other civic uses, this building now contains El Museo del Barrio.
