= Fishs Eddy (retailer) =

American dinnerware company

Fishs Eddy is a dinnerware, flatware and glassware retailer originally based in Gramercy Park, Manhattan, New York City that specializes in found dishes and serving pieces.

== History ==
Fishs Eddy was founded in 1986, when founders and current owners Julie Gaines and David Lenovitz got lost in Upstate New York and stumbled upon a small town named Fishs Eddy. Gaines and Lenovitz discovered an old barn during that trip that had stockpiled restaurant dishware that had survived a fire. They offered to buy the whole lot, took it back to their apartment in Manhattan and used the inventory to open a store at 889 Broadway, near Union Square. They additionally opened a warehouse in Jersey City, New Jersey.

A graphic novel about the history of the story, by Gaines and illustrated by her and Lenovitz's son, called Minding the Store, was published in 2018.

In 2021, Fishs Eddy started giving tours of its dinnerware collection, located on the second floor of the store, primarily featuring vintage "namesake plates." In 2022, artist Ben Lenovitz started making and selling potratit sketches of pets and animals at Fishs Eddy.

In October 2025, another location opened on Front Street in the DUMBO neighborhood of Brooklyn, marking the second current location at that time, alongside the one near Union Square, as well as the second all-time location for the retailer in Brooklyn, replacing the location on Montague Street in the Brooklyn Heights section of the borough, which had briefly been open there before closing in 2007 due to rising rent costs.

== Aesthetic ==
Fishs Eddy is known for selling vintage and surplus dinnerware, including plates and cups acquired from American Airlines and the Syracuse China Corporation. The company also produces its own dinnerware, characterized by a quirky and humorous aesthetic, with designs featuring American political figures and the skyline of New York City.

The company's New York City skyline dinnerware attracted national attention in 2014 following a dispute with the Port Authority of New York and New Jersey over its depiction of landmarks, including the former World Trade Center towers. The dispute was featured in the first season of HBO's Last Week Tonight with John Oliver, in a segment broadcast on August 3, 2014, in which host John Oliver criticized the Port Authority and satirized the nearby Port Authority Bus Terminal.

Fishs Eddy has also released dinnerware and other household products through collaborations with designers, entertainers, and retailers, including Alan Cumming, Todd Oldham, Amy Sedaris, and West Elm.
