= Archer & Pancoast Manufacturing Company =

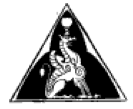
Trademark of Archer & Pancoast Manufacturing Company

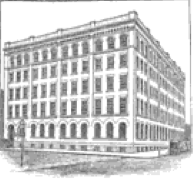
Archer & Pancoast Manufacturing Company building

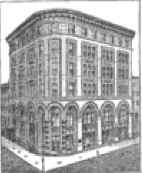
900 Broadway was constructed for Archer & Pancoast Manufacturing Company.

Archer & Pancoast Manufacturing Company was a U.S. manufacturer of gas and electric light fixtures, which ran on gas, electricity, or both. It was located at No. 67 Greene Street, and Nos. 68 to 74 Wooster Street, in New York City.

Their fixtures were found in the residences of the Vanderbilts and Marquands of New York, as well as Potter Palmer's of Chicago, Madison Square Garden, Manhattan Athletic Club, Equitable Life Building (Manhattan), United States Trust, Palace Hotel, San Francisco, Indiana State Capitol, and the Connecticut State Capitol.

== History ==
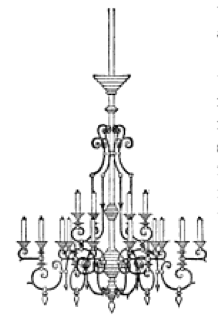
Chandelier of tubular construction by Archer & Pancoast Manufacturing Company.

This business was originally established as Archer, Pancoast & Company, in 1859, the co-partnership consisting of Ellis S. Archer, William C. Ellison, and George Pancoast. From a modest beginning, the operations of the business steadily grew, and in a few years, it had won a national reputation for the artistic excellence of its products. In 1868, the business had increased to such extensive proportions that a stock company was organized and incorporated under the laws of New York State, with a capital of US$300,000. The mammoth factory and warehouse were located at No. 67 Greene Street, extending through to Nos. 68, 70, 72, and 74 Wooster Street. The factory was arranged and equipped with modern machinery and appliances, the majority of which were specially designed and built for these works. A force of 350 skilled mechanics was employed at one time. Each department was under the management of a manager, and the whole was regulated by a system that both facilitated business and assured the prompt execution of orders.

The position that Archer & Pancoast attained in the production of gas fixtures, chandeliers, electric light fixtures, and artistic metal work was universally recognized throughout the US. Their showrooms featured displays, one of which was a great attraction to visitors. The company fitted up with gas fixtures in some of the largest public edifices throughout the country. Hundreds of New York's palatial private residences and extensive commercial buildings also contained their artistic products. The company did an extensive wholesale trade throughout the country. They had branch offices located in Boston and Chicago, both of which were heavily stocked with their specialties.

As the business grew, Robert and Ogden Goelet erected 900 Broadway, a new and extensive building for Archer & Pancoast at 20th Street and Broadway. The factory was a six-story brick building, erected in 1888. The Archer & Pancoast Company, was incorporated in 1868. It had a paid-up capital of $600,000 by 1892 and employed 500 workmen.

By 1896, the Archer & Pancoast Company had salesrooms at Nos. 18 and 20 West 25th Street, Manhattan, and a factory at Flushing and Carlton Avenues, Brooklyn. It went into the hands of receivers, on August 19, 1896. Justice Smyth, of the Supreme Court appointed Albert C. Hetherington, William S. Fearing and Peter F. Meyer receivers, with a bond of $100,000, on the application of President Pancoast and other directors of the company. Mr. Fearing was vice-president and general manager; Paul Thompson, treasurer and Mr. Hetherington, a director. Thomas B. Odell was appointed referee, and the order to show cause for the dissolution was set down for February 5, 1897. It was said by the officers that the company was insolvent, that it had recently found it impossible to obtain money in any considerable quantity owing to the financial stringency all over the US, and that within the last week, the bank with which the company had always done business had refused further to extend its line of discount. To save the assets from slaughter and make the best possible disposition of the property, the officers deemed it best to apply for receivers.

The total liabilities are $806,780, and the nominal assets $821,063. Of the liabilities, $705,017 were mortgage liens on all the property of the company, except accounts receivable. These mortgages were for purchase money of factory, $55,000; to secure notes, $267,482, and to secure income bonds, $378,465. There was due for merchandise $51,025 and for loans by stockholders $37,074. The assets consisted of real estate and factory in Brooklyn, $200,000; machinery, $201,552; models, patterns, $100,000; merchandise, $139,037; improvements at the factory, $17,844; store fixtures, $12,000; goods in the New York store, $37,067; stock of other companies, $11,000; and accounts receivable, $102,563. Of the accounts, $18,000 was probably uncollectable, and $14,414 had been pledged to secure advances. The officers believed that there would be no equity in the assets which were covered by the mortgage liens leaving only the accounts to pay the unsecured debts. The company did not have Bradstreet's rating. It was a reorganization of the old Archer & Pancoast Manufacturing Company, which went into the hands of receivers in May 1893, with liabilities of $1,100,000. The property was sold to the Reorganization Committee tor $600,000. and the newer company was formed by the creditors in November 1894, to carry on the business. About 400 persons were employed by the company at this time.

== Bibliography ==
- The Electrical Engineer (1896). The Electrical Engineer: A Weekly Review of Theoretical and Applied Electricity (Public domain ed.). Williams & Company.
- Historical Publishing Company (1886). Finance and Industry: The New York Stock Exchange : Banks, Bankers, Business Houses, and Moneyed Institutions : the Great Metropolis of the United States : Copyrighted (Public domain ed.). New York, New York: Historical Publishing Company.
- Sweetser, Moses Foster (1892). King's Handbook of the United States (Public domain ed.). Moses King Corporation.
