= Toy Center =

Buildings in Manhattan, New York

Coordinates: 40°44′31″N 73°59′22″W

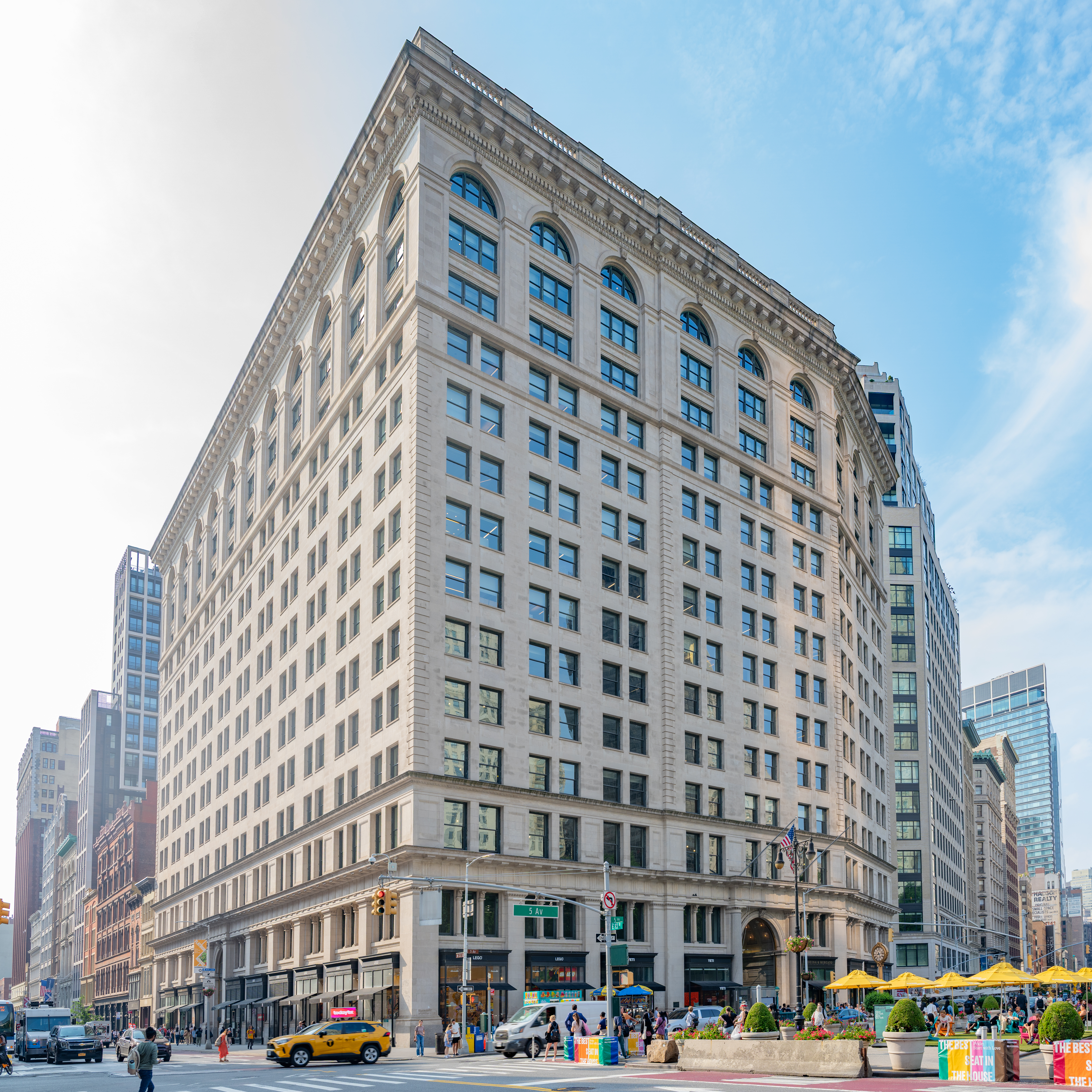
As seen from Madison Square Park (2025)

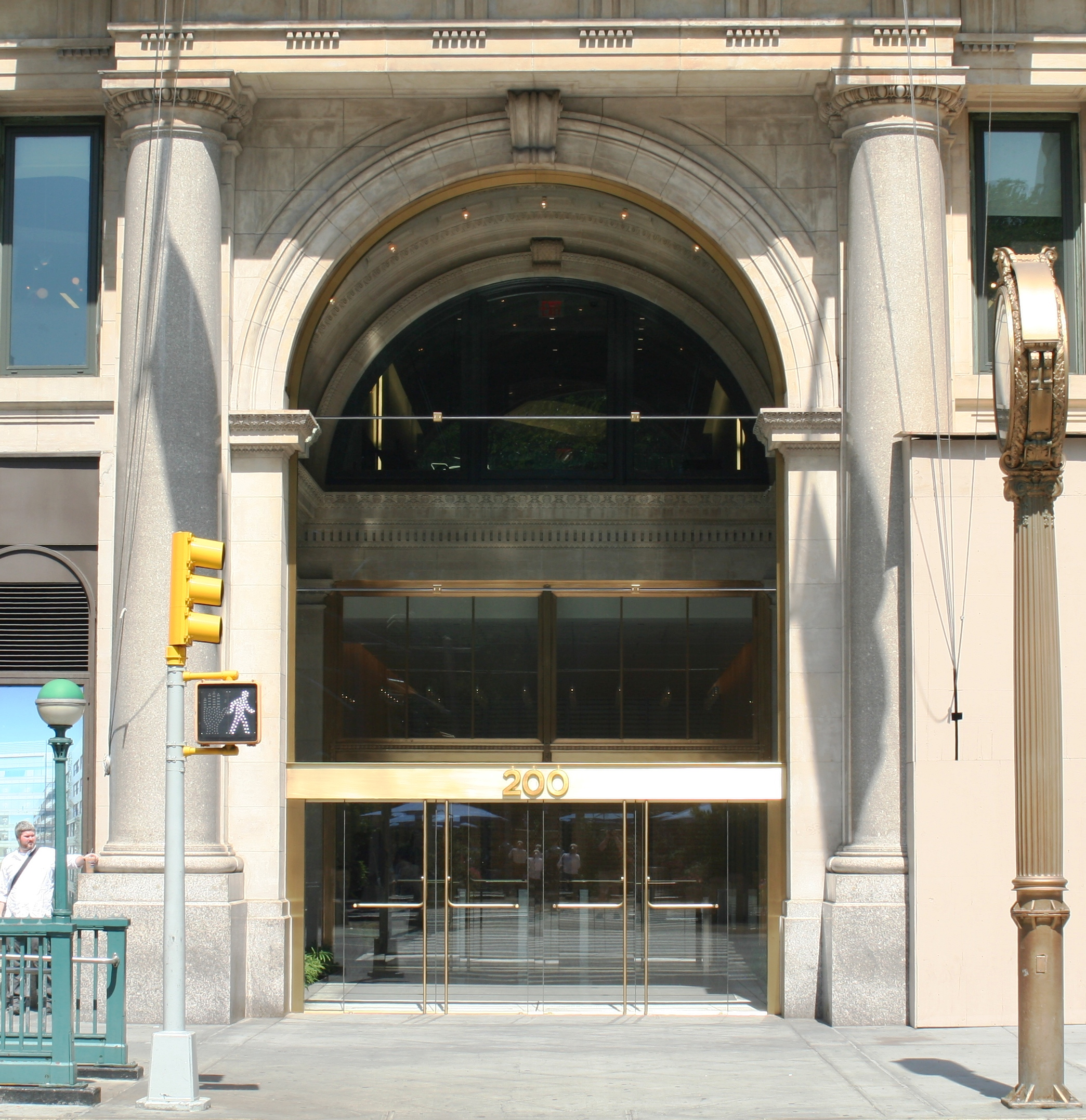
The Toy Center's entrance on Fifth Avenue; the clock seen below is in profile on the right

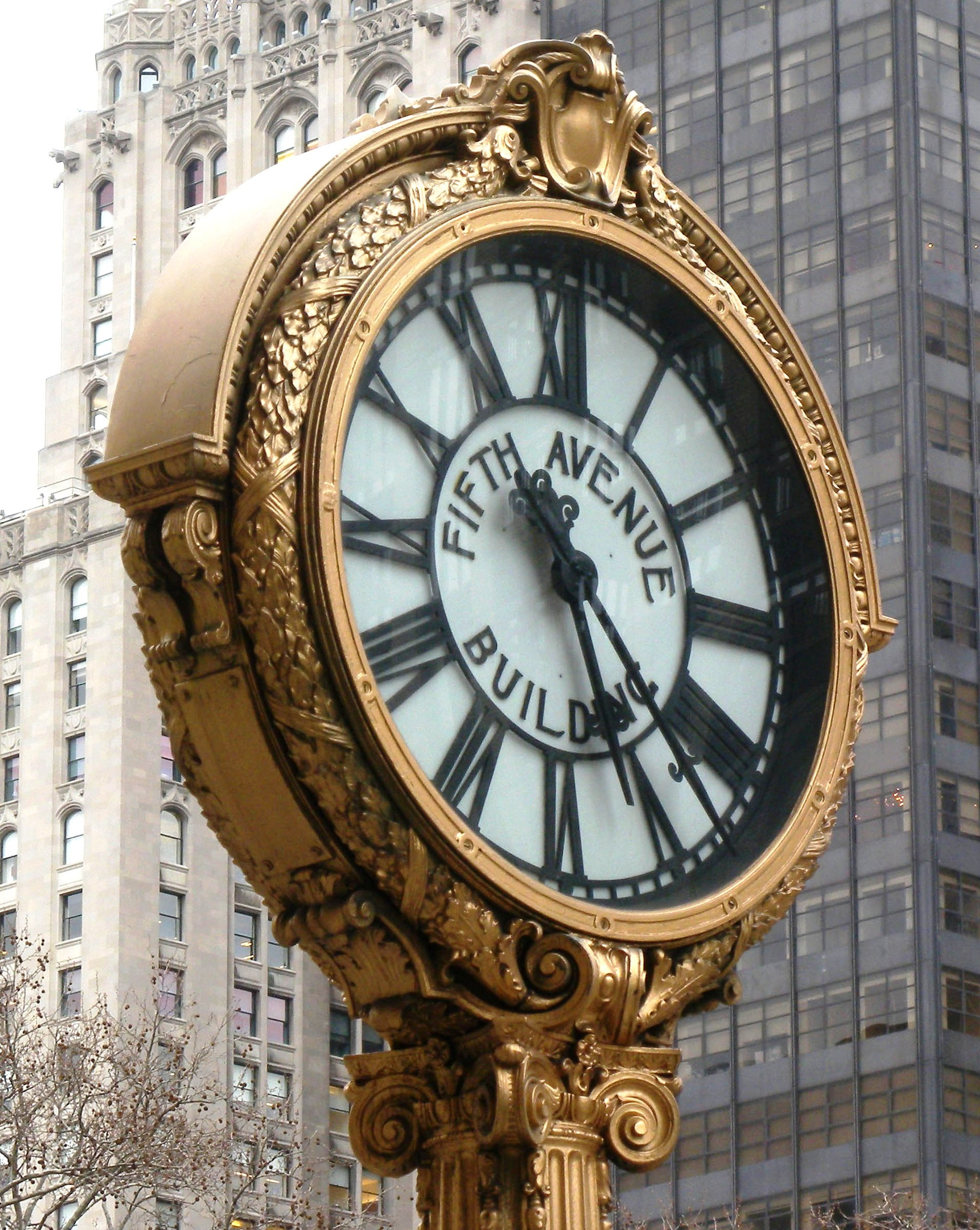
The sidewalk clock, manufactured in 1909, outside the Toy Center

The Toy Center, also known as the International Toy Center, is a complex of buildings in the Flatiron District of Manhattan, New York City, that for many years was a hub for toy manufacturers and distributors in the United States. It includes two buildings located between 23rd Street and 25th Street across from Madison Square, where Fifth Avenue and Broadway cross. The American International Toy Fair, the industry's major annual trade show, is held annually in February at both the Toy Center and the Javits Center on 34th Street. The building also serves as the corporate headquarters of luxury retailer Tiffany & Co.

== History ==
The original building, at 200 Fifth Avenue, was constructed on the site of what had been the Fifth Avenue Hotel, which was completed in 1859 and was demolished in 1908. The hotelier's grandson, Henry Lane Eno, was the developer.

=== 20th century ===
The 16-story building was completed in 1909 and was originally known as the Fifth Avenue Building, which name is on the landmark street clock outside the front entrance, and the interlocked initials "F.A.B." were still in the building's elevators in 2003. The architects were Robert Maynicke and Julius Franke. An ornate cast-iron street clock outside the main entrance, built by Hecla Iron Works in 1909, became a New York City designated landmark in 1981.

The building became a center for the toy industry during World War I, following restrictions on imports from the then-traditional European manufacturers. From 1910 to 1927, the Boy Scouts of America National Headquarters was located in the building.

A second 16-story building at 1107 Broadway was acquired in 1967, and a pedestrian bridge over 24th Street, connecting the two buildings at the ninth floor, was constructed the following year. Most of the industry's major companies had moved in by World War II, and building manager Helmsley-Spear restricted new leases exclusively to toy companies starting in the 1960s.

By 1981, the complex covered 1,000,000 square feet (93,000 m^{2}) of leasable space, with its 600 tenants accounting for 95% of toy transactions in the United States that year, amounting to $4 billion (equivalent to $14.2 billion in 2025). The American International Toy Fair, held jointly at the Toy Center and at the Javits Center in February, brought up to 10,000 buyers from the United States and around the world.

=== 21st century ===
In early 2005, the building complex was sold by the Malkin family for $355 million to the Chetrit Group. In April 2007, L&L Holding Company bought 200 Fifth Avenue for $500 million. Tenants at the building now include Grey Global Group, Tiffany & Co., TKO Group Holdings, and Eataly.

In October 2007, the Chetrit Group sold the 1107 Broadway part of the complex to developer Yitzchak Tessler for $235 million. Lehman Brothers provided a $136.8 million to finance the purchase of the property. Tesslar then announced plans to convert the building into luxury condos.

In October 2008, shortly after the Lehman Brothers bankruptcy, their loan to Tesslar came due, however he failed to refinance the project and the building remained largely vacant and undeveloped. In December 2009, land research firm Real Capital Analytic added the building to their list of troubled assets. Tessler claimed that he failed to refinance because Lehman Brothers "did not fulfill their pre-construction obligation." Lehman Brothers Holding Co. filed a suit against Tessler in 2010 and threatened foreclosure, however all litigation was eventually dropped after Tessler settled with the bankrupt company, and the property ended up in Lehman's commercial real estate portfolio. Lehman then held an auction for the building in June 2011. A group of investors led by the Witkoff Group won the auction, purchasing the property for $191 million.

== See also ==
- NoMad
