= Edward H. Kendall =

American architect (1842–1901)

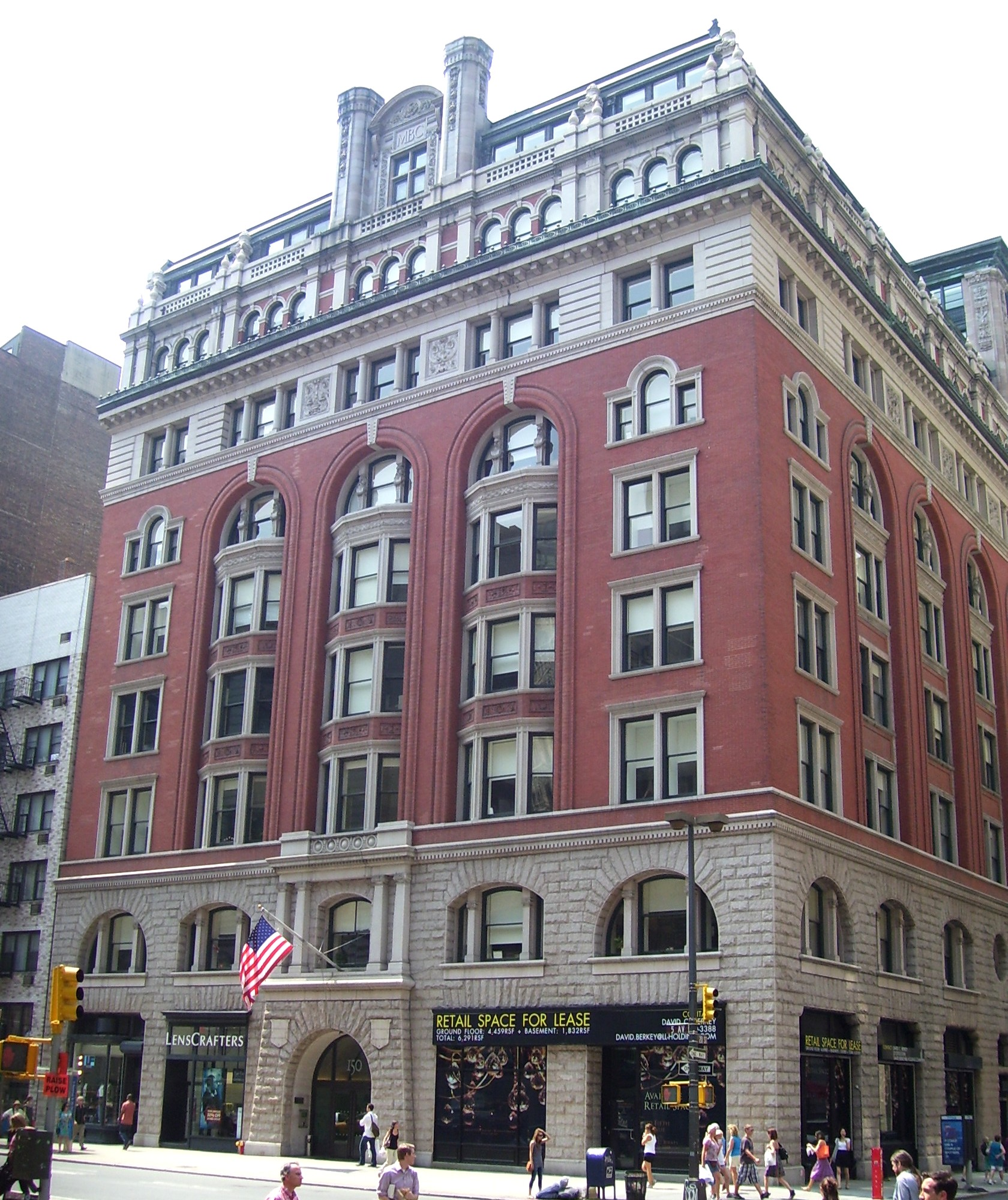
150 Fifth Avenue in Manhattan was originally the Methodist Book Concern: "MBC" can still be seen on its crown; the building contained printing presses and offices, but also a chapel

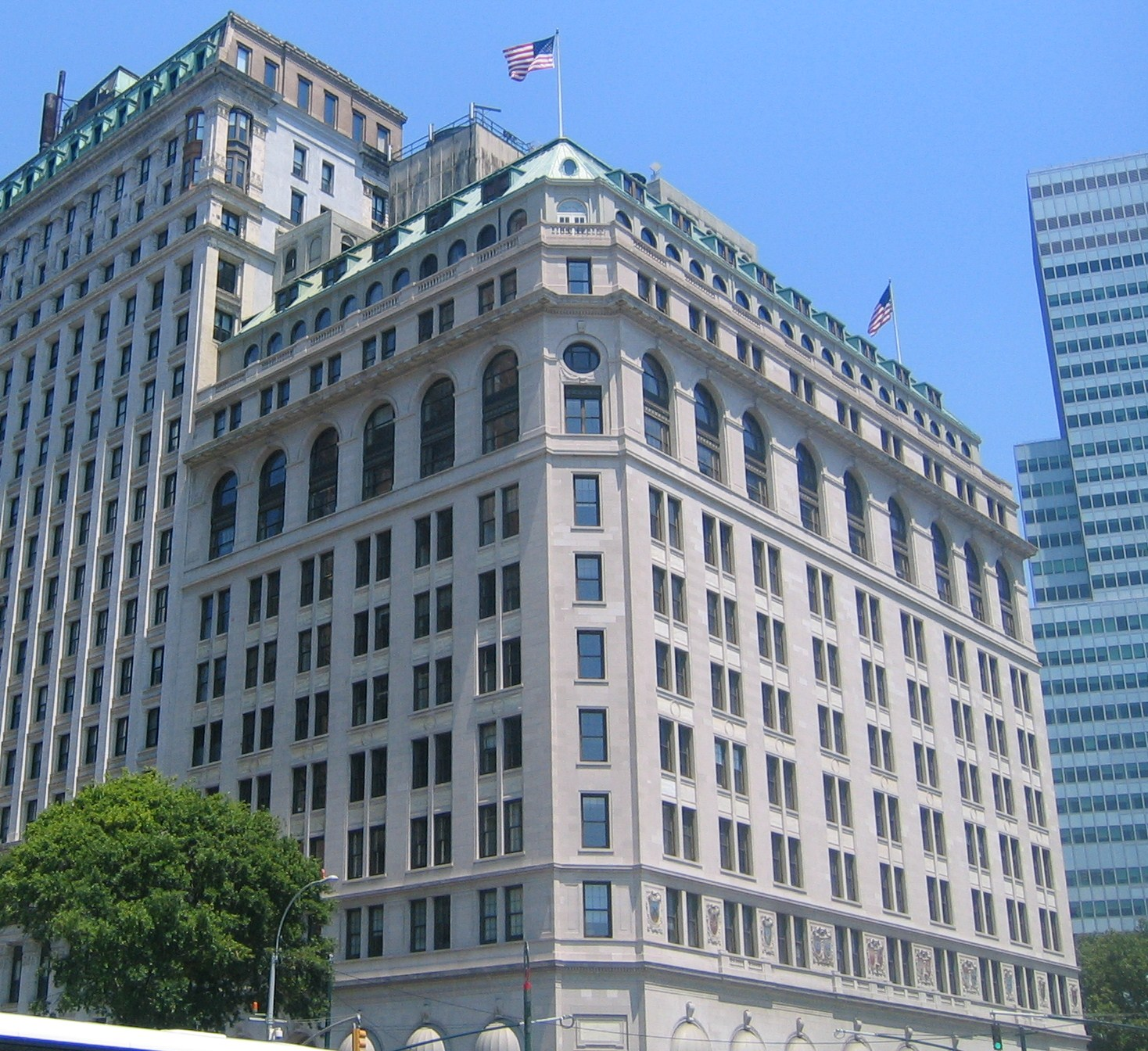
International Mercantile Marine Company Building (formerly the Washington Building and refacaded when it was purchased)

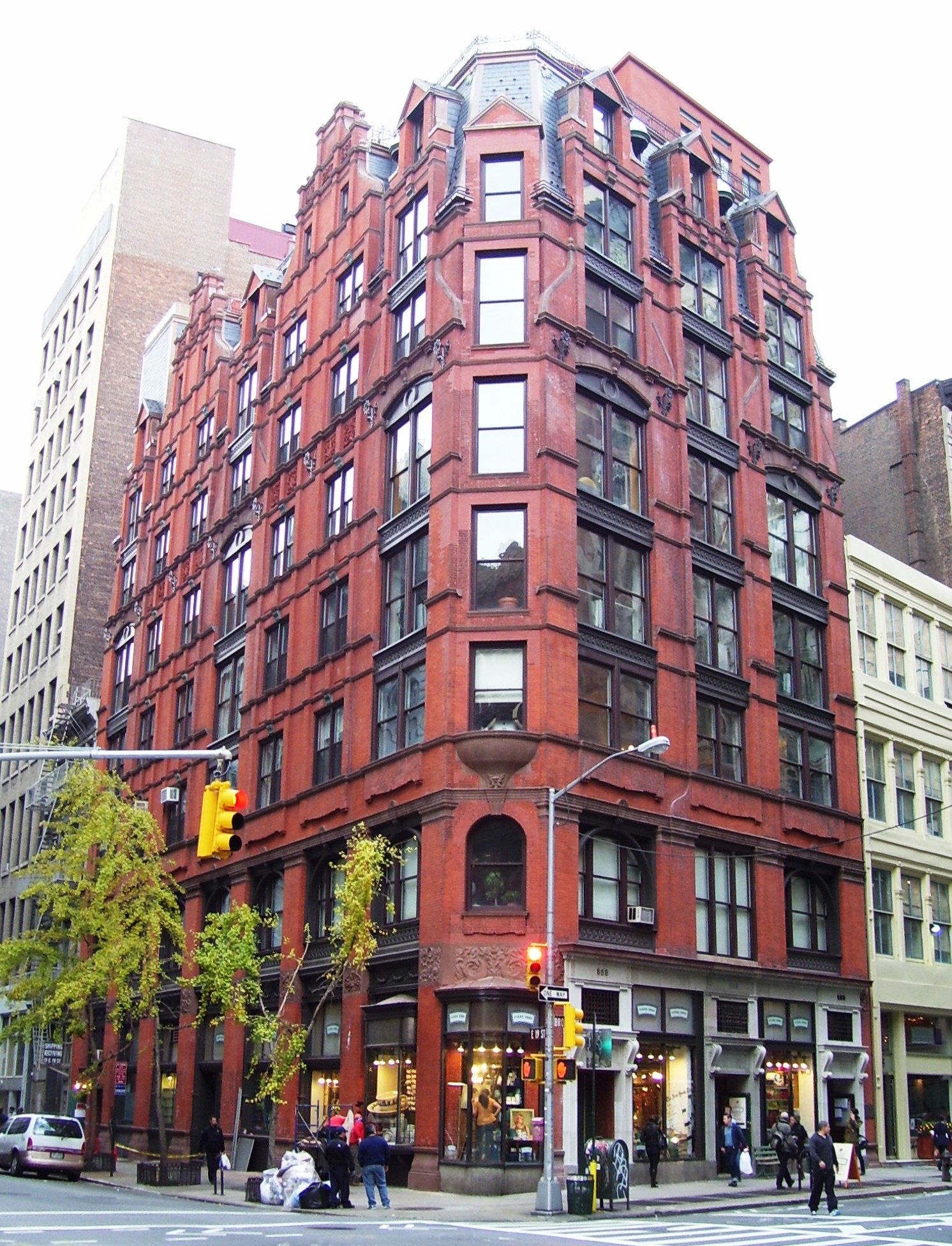
Gorham Manufacturing, 889 Broadway

Edward Hale Kendall (July 30, 1842 – March 10, 1901) was an American architect with a practice in New York City.

== Biography ==
Born in Boston, Massachusetts, Kendall was one of the first generation of Americans to study in Paris; he apprenticed in the office of the construction engineer Gridley James Fox Bryant, Boston. He moved to New York where he collaborated with Bryant's collaborator in developing Boston's Back Bay, Arthur Gilman, in building the Equitable Life Assurance Society Building (1868–71). He soon established independent practice and was a member (1868) and eventually President (1892–93) of the American Institute of Architects, in which capacity he presided over the AIA conventions held during the World's Columbian Exposition, Chicago 1893.

After the humiliating defeat of an Act to License the Practice of Architecture in New York (1892), The Tarsney Act of 1893, by which the Federal Government was to hire private architects through competitions, was passed by Congress largely owing to his persistence as president of the American Institute of Architects.

Kendall died in New York City, New York in 1901.

== Selected works ==
All works were in New York, unless otherwise noted.

- Equitable Life Building, Broadway and Cedar Street (1868–71, in partnership with Arthur Gilman; George B. Post assisted) The commission was awarded after a competition in which H.H. Richardson participated. A six-storey commercial building of unprecedented height, it had passenger elevators to make the uppermost floors accessible, the first office building to employ this technology. Additions by Kendall were made in 1898-99, and further modifications by George B. Post. The building burned in 1912 and was rebuilt to a new design.
- 425-27 Broome Street, corner of Crosby Street (1874). A cast-iron building in Neo-Grec style. Carefully restored in 2005-06.
- German Savings Bank, southeast corner of 14th Street and 4th Avenue (with Henry Fernbach)
- Goelet houses for brothers Robert Goelet (591 Fifth Avenue, 1880, southeast corner of 48th Street) and Ogden Goelet (608 Fifth Avenue, 1882, southwest corner of 49th Street). The brownstone Goelet corner houses were among the last private mansions on Fifth Avenue below Central Park. His mother having died in 1929, Ogden's son Robert W. Goelet replaced 608 Fifth Avenue in 1932 with the Art Deco Goelet Building (now the Swiss Center Building), itself a designated historic landmark, that is "one giant Art Moderne cigarette case of marble", according to Christopher Gray.
- Gorham Manufacturing Company Building, 889-91 Broadway, northwest corner of 19th Street, built for Robert and Ogden Goelet (1883–84, altered by John H. Duncan, who removed the corner tower and added dormers, 1912). A commercial building with two floors of showrooms and kitchenless "bachelor flats" above, it was entirely in commercial use by 1893, as even bachelors moved uptown. Designated a New York City Landmark in 1984.
- One Broadway (1883–84), also called International Mercantile Marine Company Building, (NRHP), facing Bowling Green, a ten-storey office building built for Cyrus W. Field as the "Washington Building"; Kendall added four more storeys that gave it a "Hôtel de Ville" roof and a cupola prominent from the harbor in 1887; the structure was stripped of its "Queen Anne" brick and brownstone exterior ornament, which had served, according to an early observer in the New York Times, as "a reminder of old Colonial days." "The completed structure, 258 feet high, was the Pan Am Building of its time, Christopher Gray observed, "a comparative giant, of unique silhouette, dominating one of the most important vistas of New York." The facade was stripped and refaced in limestone for new owners, a shipping firm, the International Mercantile Marine Company (1919–21), but the courtyard elevation, not visible from the street was left largely intact.
- Navarro house and outbuildings, built for Jose de Navarro in Rumson, New Jersey, purchased in 1891 by Jacob Schiff.
- 150 Fifth Avenue, southwest corner of 20th Street (1888). Kendall had his office in this Romanesque Revival building, with his son William M. Kendall. It was formerly the headquarters for the Methodist Book Concern, for whose press room, composing room and bindery its penthouse was expanded in 1900 and 1909. A renovation in 2001 restored its pink granite ground-floor rustication.
- 64-66 Wooster Street, between Spring and Broome Streets (1899). 40°43′24″N 74°0′6″W It currently houses The Ohio Theatre.
- Washington Bridge (1888, consulting architect). This truss arch bridge linking Manhattan to The Bronx was redesigned by William R. Hutton and Kendall, based on a design submitted by C. C. Schneider that was pared down to bring the bridge's cost to $3 million.
- American Express Company Building, Hudson Street (1890–91)
