= Eisenberg's Sandwich Shop =

Restaurant in New York City

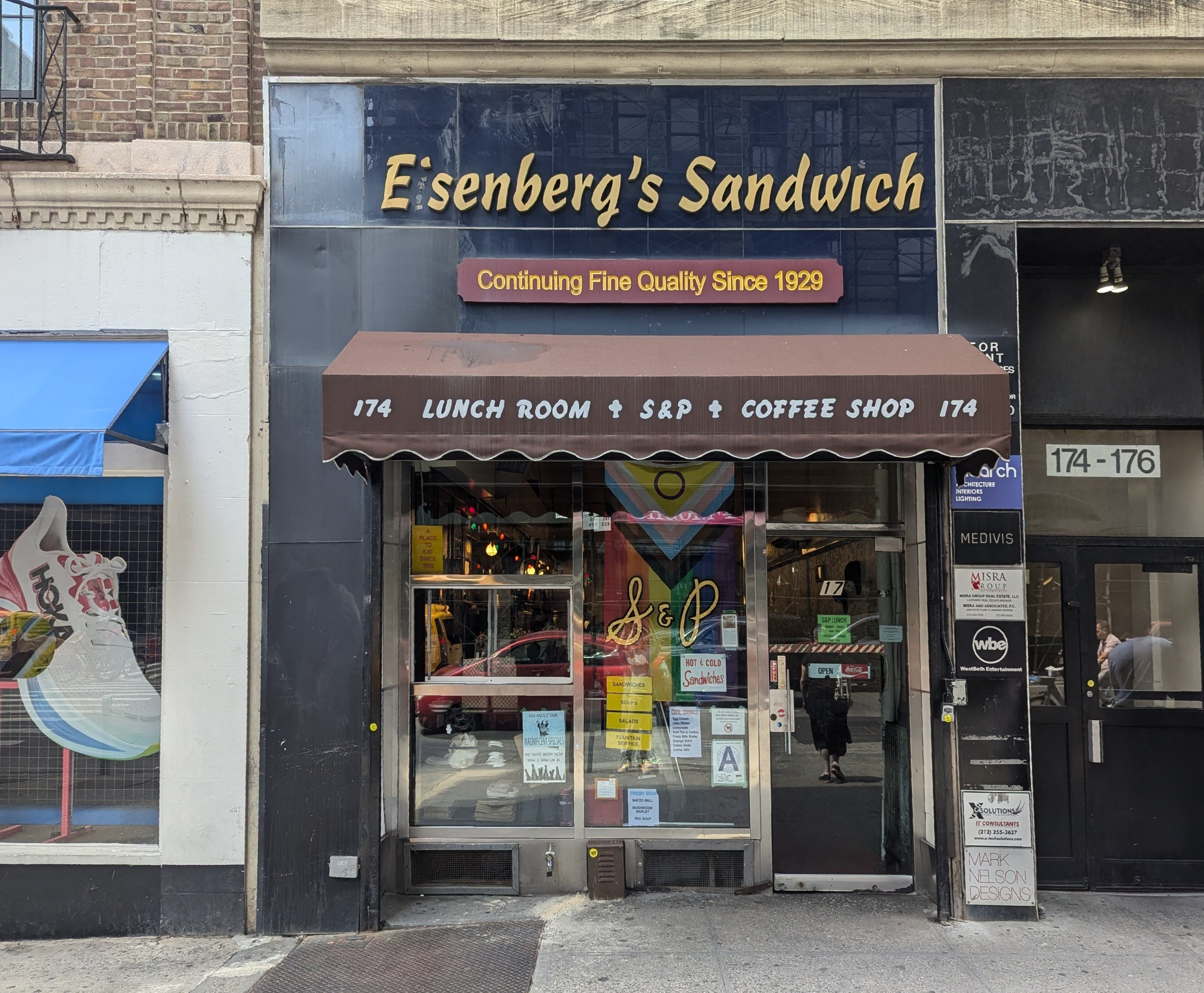
- Eisenberg's in 2024 (doing business as S&P Lunch)
- Interactive map of Eisenberg's Sandwich Shop

Restaurant information
- Established: 1928
- Location: 174 Fifth Avenue, Manhattan, New York, 10010, United States
- Coordinates: 40°44′28″N 73°59′24″W
- Seating capacity: 62
- Website: sandwich.place

Eisenberg's Sandwich Shop is a New York City lunch counter established in the Flatiron District in 1928.

== History ==
In 1928, Charles Schwadron and Rubin Pulver opened a diner in a newly erected building across the street from the landmark Flatiron Building. The next year, they sold the restaurant to Monus Eisenberg, who renamed the establishment, and whose family would continue to operate it until 1979.

For several years, Eisenberg's was owned by Louie Weisberg, who sold the business to Steve Oh in 1988. In 2006, Oh sold the business to one of his regular customers, Josh Konecky, who had never run a restaurant before but was passionate about preserving the neighborhood fixture. In 2018, facing rising rents, Konecky sold Eisenberg's to hotel executive Warren Chiu.

In 2021, the doors were closed after Chiu allegedly failed to pay rent, but it reopened under new ownership in 2022, along with a name change back to S&P Lunch (Chiu having retained rights to the Eisenberg's name). S&P Lunch is owned by Eric Finkelstein and Matt Ross, who also own Court Street Grocers, a local sandwich shop chain.

== Restaurant ==
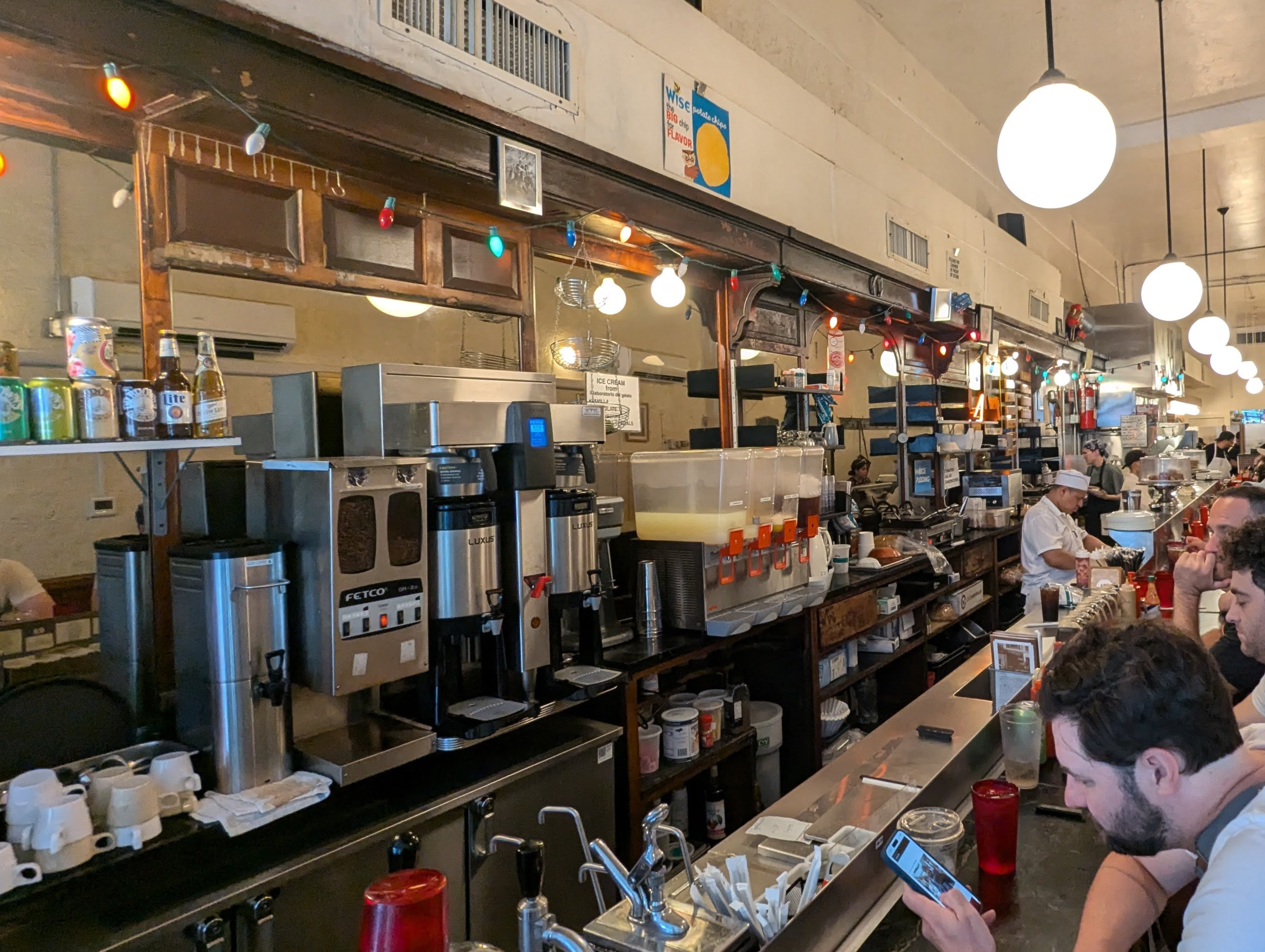
Diners seated at the counter

The restaurant's narrow interior features an original 40 feet (12 m) long counter and swiveling, vinyl-covered stools. In about 2005, a back room was added, expanding the seating capacity to 62.

The menu highlights sandwiches, along with Jewish classics and breakfast items. Classic sandwiches include tuna salad, meatloaf and pastrami, along with throwbacks like olive and cream cheese. In 2017, Grub Street proclaimed Eisenberg's egg cream to be one of the best in New York.
