= Fishs Eddy, New York =

- Hamlet
- Location within New York Location within the United States
- Coordinates: 41°57′49″N 75°10′30″W
- Country: United States
- State: New York
- County: Delaware
- Elevation: 984 ft (300 m)
- Time zone: UTC-5 (Eastern (EST))
  - Summer (DST): UTC-4 (EDT)
- ZIP code: 13774
- Area code: 607
- GNIS feature ID: 950180

Fishs Eddy (/fɪʃəz/ FISH-əz) is a hamlet in Delaware County, New York, United States. The community is located along the East Branch Delaware River, 5.5 miles (8.9 km) east of Hancock, off New York State Route 17 at Exit 89. Fishs Eddy has a post office with ZIP code 13774.

The hamlet has also given its name to a store selling dinnerware, flatware and glassware in the Gramercy Park area of New York City.
