= Flatiron District =

Neighborhood in New York City

Coordinates: 40°44′28″N 73°59′22″W

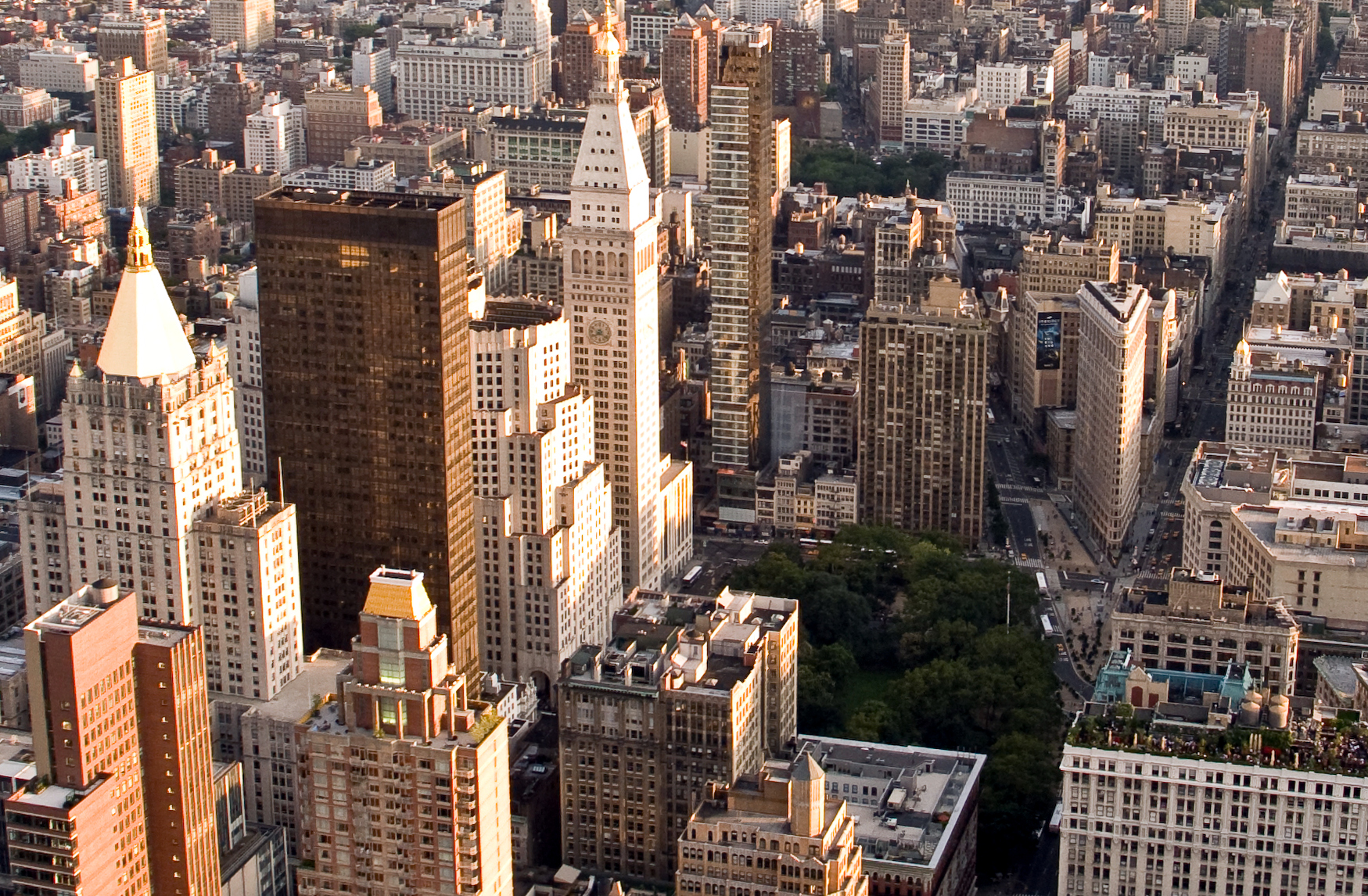
View from the Empire State Building looking southward (downtown) at the central Flatiron District. The Flatiron Building is the triangular building at right center. To the left is the Met Life Tower, with Madison Square Park in the center. Madison Avenue begins at 23rd Street between the park and the tower, and runs uptown (toward bottom of image). Madison Square is the intersection in front of the Flatiron, where Fifth Avenue and Broadway cross. (Fifth goes to the right, Broadway to the left.) The trees of Union Square Park can be seen in the top center of the image.

The Flatiron District is a neighborhood in the borough of Manhattan of New York City, named for the Flatiron Building at 23rd Street, Broadway and Fifth Avenue. Generally, the Flatiron District is bounded by 14th Street, Union Square and Greenwich Village to the south; the Avenue of the Americas (Sixth Avenue) and Chelsea to the west; 23rd Street and Madison Square (or NoMad) to the north; and Park Avenue South and Gramercy Park to the east.

Broadway cuts through the middle of the district, and Madison Avenue begins at 23rd Street and runs north. At the north (uptown) end of the district is Madison Square Park, which was completely renovated in 2001. The Flatiron District encompasses within its boundaries the Ladies' Mile Historic District and the birthplace of Theodore Roosevelt, a National Historic Site. The Flatiron District was also the birthplace of Silicon Alley, a metonym for New York's high technology sector, which has since spread beyond the area.

The Flatiron District is part of Manhattan Community District 5. Residents are represented by the Flatiron Alliance neighborhood association and nearby businesses by the Flatiron NoMad Partnership business improvement district, though the two have different (partially overlapping) boundaries.

== History and name ==
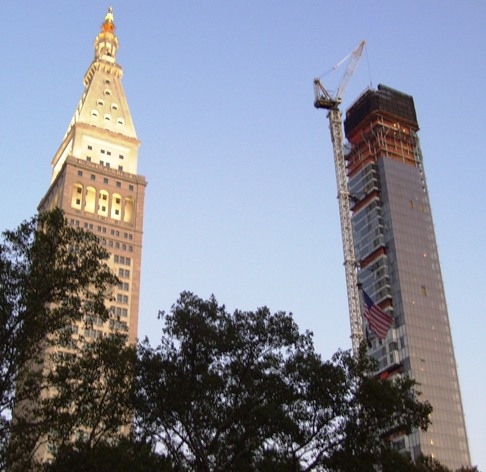
The Met Life Tower (left), with One Madison Park (right) under construction (September 2008)

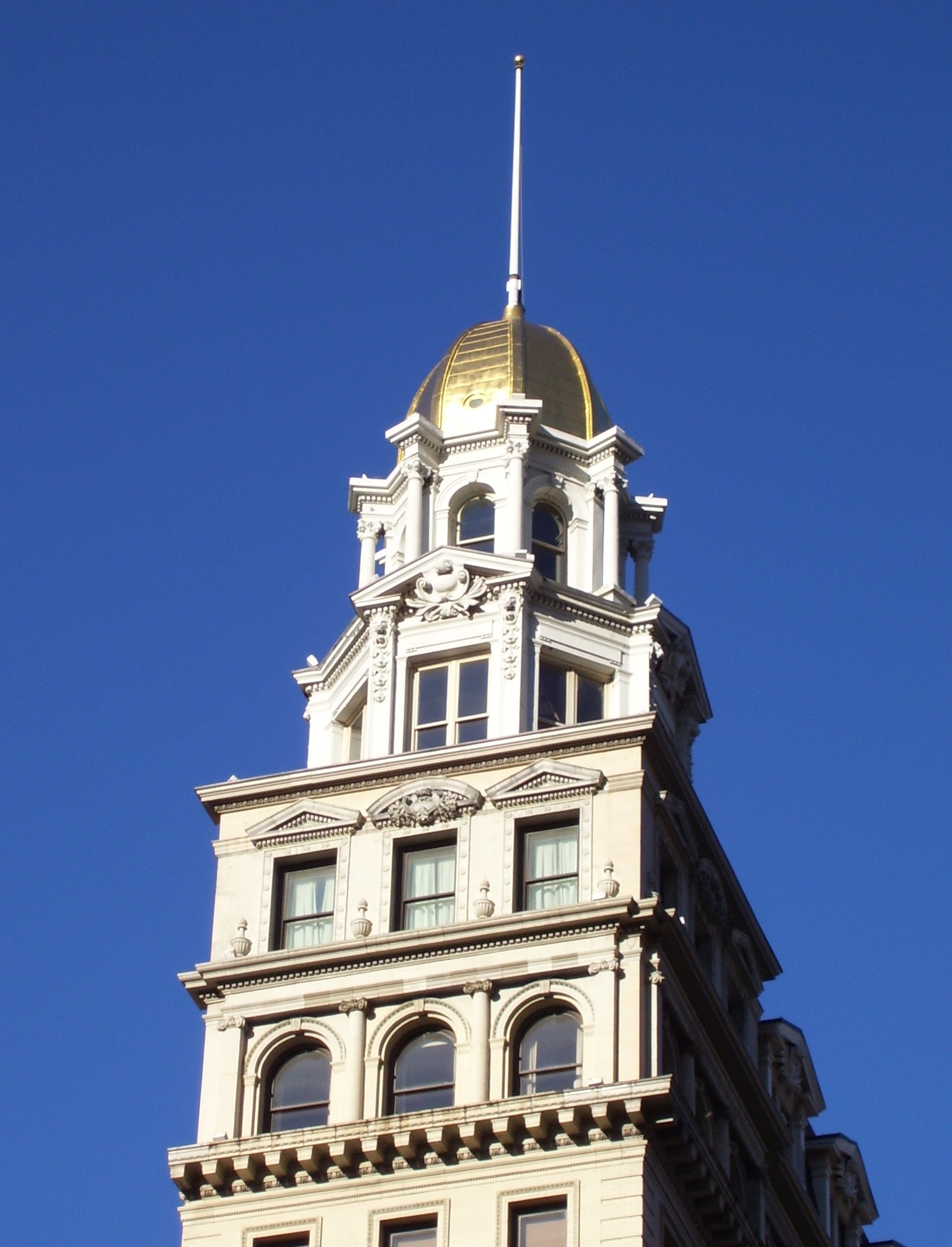
The gold dome of the Sohmer Piano Building (1897) is a distinctive landmark of the Flatiron District.

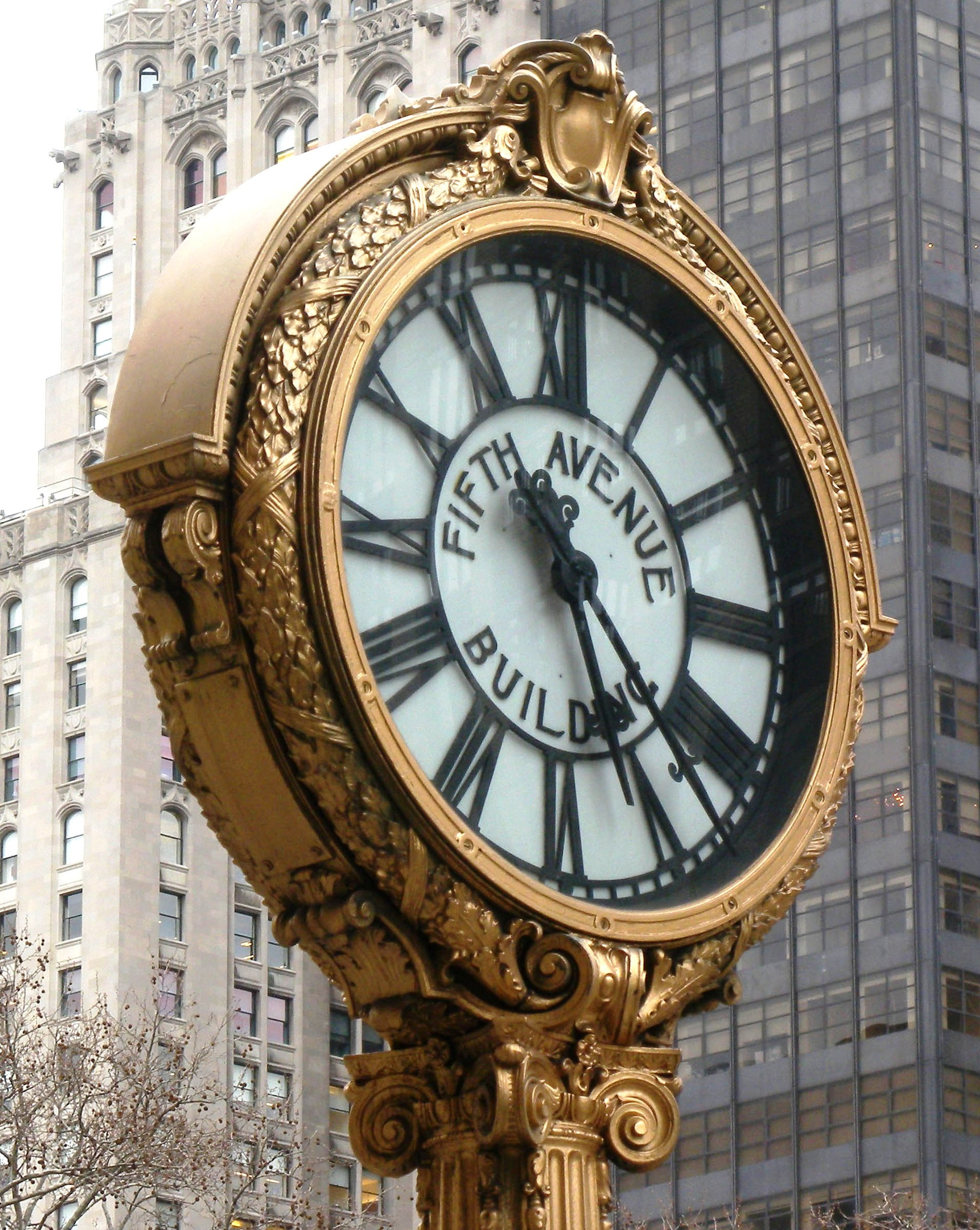
Clock at 200 Fifth Avenue

The designation "Flatiron District" dates from around 1985, and came about because of its increasingly residential character, and the influx of many restaurants into the area – real estate agents needed an appealing name to call the area in their ads. Before that, the area was primarily commercial, with numerous small clothing and toy manufacturers, and was sometimes called the Toy District. The Toy Center buildings at 23rd Street and Broadway date from this period, and the annual American International Toy Fair took place there beginning in 1903, except for 1945. When much of this business moved outside the U.S., the area began to be referred to as the Photo District because of the large number of photographers' studios and associated businesses located there, the photographers having come because of the relatively cheap rents.

As of the 2000s, many publishers have their offices in the district, as well as advertising agencies, and the number of computer- and Web-related start-up companies in the area caused it to be considered part of "Silicon Alley" or "Multimedia Gulch", along with TriBeCa and SoHo.

The Flatiron district was bounded by the center of the printing trades south of 23rd Street and the garment industry starting to the north of 23rd Street. With the collapse of the printing trades and the textile industries in New York City, the area's business focus shifted towards technology companies, and to firms serving the employees in the high-tech, finance, media, legal, and medical sectors.

== Buildings ==
The Flatiron District is located in the part of Manhattan where the bedrock Manhattan schist is located deeper underground than it is above 29th Street and below Canal Street. Under the influence of zoning laws, the tallest buildings in the area used to top out at around 20 stories; older buildings of 3-6 floors are still numerous, especially on the side streets.

Notable buildings in the district include the Flatiron Building, one of the oldest of the original New York skyscrapers. To the east, at 1 Madison Avenue, is the Met Life Tower, built in 1909 and at 700 feet (210 m) was the tallest building in the world until 1913, when the Woolworth Building was completed. It is now occupied by Credit Suisse since MetLife moved their headquarters to the Pan Am Building. The marble clock tower of the building, modeled on St Mark's Campanile in Venice, dominates Madison Square and the park there.

Nearby, on Madison Avenue between 26th and 27th Streets, on the site of the old Madison Square Garden, is the New York Life Building, built in 1928 and designed by Cass Gilbert, with a square tower topped by a pyramid covered with gold-colored tiles. The Appellate Division Courthouse of New York State on Madison Avenue at 25th Street, was completed in 1900 by architect James Brown Lord, who used a third of the construction budget to decorate the building with statues and murals.

Completed in 2010, One Madison Park, a 50-story luxury condominium tower, sits at 23 East 22nd Street, at the foot of Madison Avenue and across from Madison Square Park. It is nearly as tall as the Met Life Tower (617.5 feet (188.2 m), compared to 700 feet (210 m) for the Tower), and taller than the Flatiron Building. The triplex penthouse was purchased for $57.3 million in February 2014.

Another landmark is the 1909 sidewalk clock outside 200 Fifth Avenue.

== Education ==
The campus of the City University of New York's Baruch College is located between 23rd and 25th Streets on Lexington Avenue, at the eastern edge of the district. The Field Building at 23rd Street and Lexington Avenue, the oldest building on the Baruch campus, sits on the former site of the Free Academy (now City College of New York), which was founded in 1847 and was the first institution of free public higher education in the United States. Baruch's Newman Vertical Campus as well as the Zicklin School of Business, the largest collegiate school of business in the United States, are also located on 24th and 25th Streets between Third and Lexington Avenues.

== Culture and shopping ==
Cultural attractions in the area include Tibet House US, the Tibetan cultural preservation and education nonprofit founded by Robert Thurman and Richard Gere, which features a gallery and exhibitions on 15th Street. The Museum of Sex and the Gershwin Hotel, are both located on 27th Street. The Gershwin is a tribute to the late pop artist Andy Warhol, and features some of his art and memorabilia throughout the hotel.

The area has many stores, such as Ann Taylor, Victoria's Secret, Club Monaco, and Origins. "Big-box" retailers dominate Sixth Avenue between 14th Street and 23rd Street, at the district's western edge.

One of the neighborhood's older restaurants is Eisenberg's Sandwich Shop, founded in 1929. The classic 40-foot (12 m) lunch counter restaurant at 174 Fifth Avenue, near East 22nd Street, changed owners five times over the last 94 years. It was saved from closing in 2005 by a loyal customer, closed again in March 2021 due to the Covid pandemic, and reopened as S & P, named for a sandwich shop that opened in the space in 1928.

== Notable residents ==
- Joe Quesada, comic book writer/artist/editor, and Chief Creative Officer of Marvel Comics.
- Chelsea Clinton, the daughter of U.S. President Bill Clinton and Secretary of State Hillary Clinton, as well as her husband Marc Mezvinsky and their children, moved to the Flatiron District in 2016, having previously lived in nearby NoMad and Gramercy Park.

== See also ==
- Ladies' Mile Historic District
- Madison Square North Historic District
- Madison Square Park
