= Arnold Constable & Company =

US retail chain

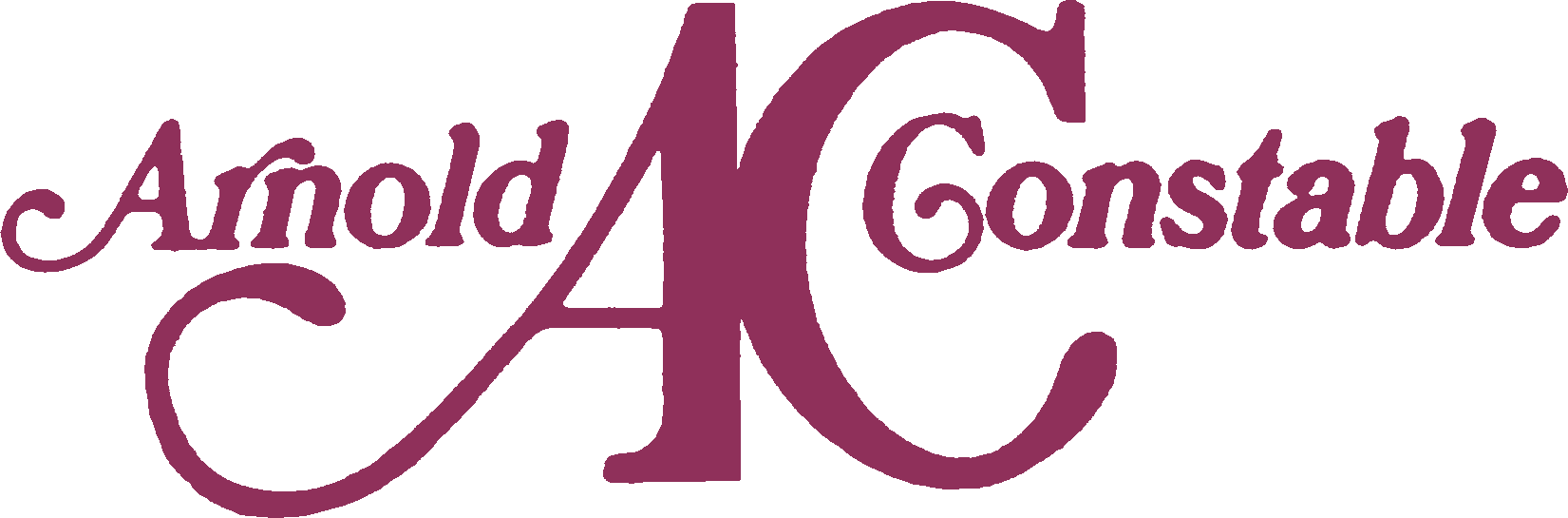

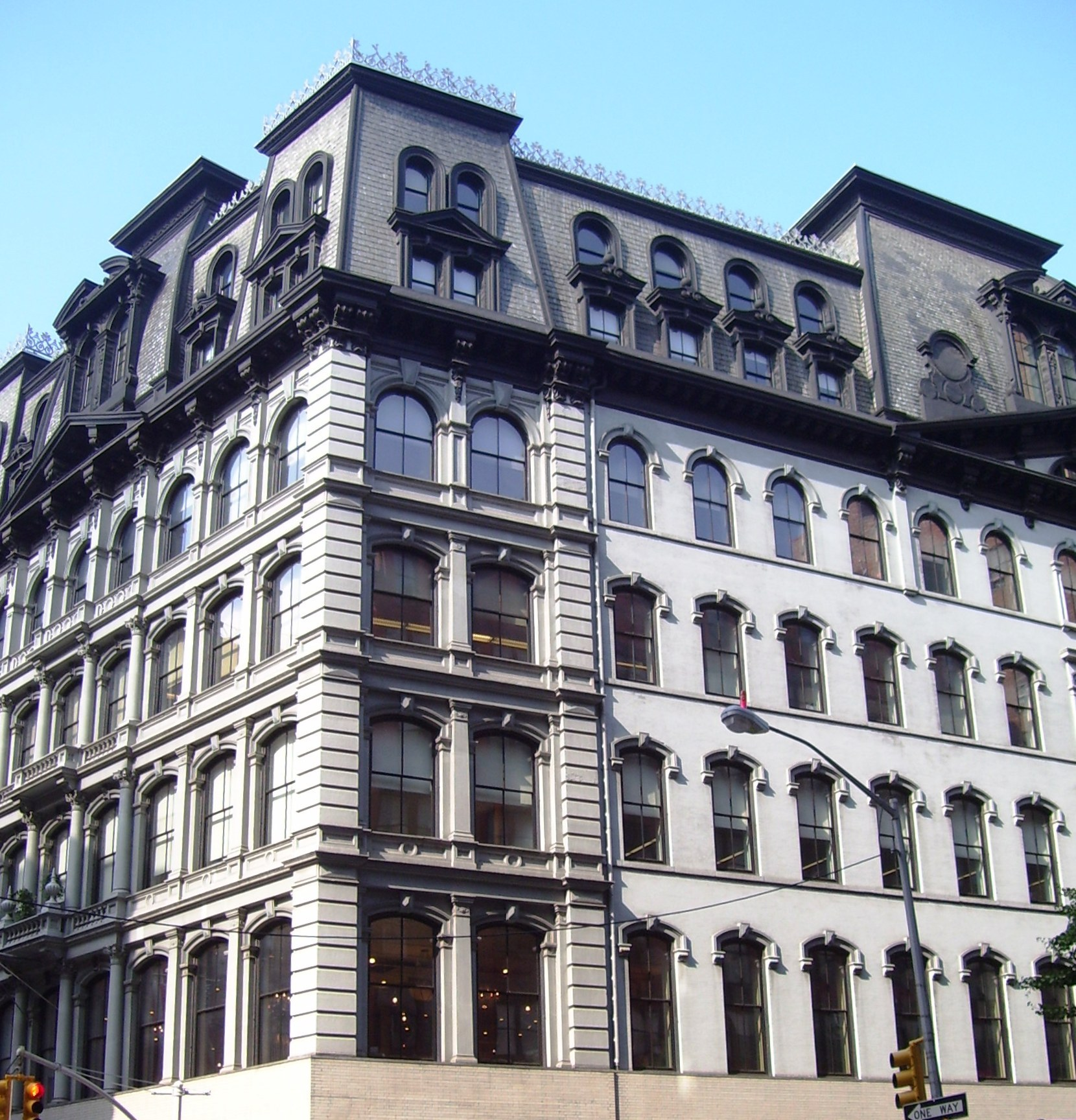
- The upper floors of the Broadway facade of the "Palace of Trade", showing the mansard roof
- Industry: Department store
- Headquarters: New York City

Arnold Constable & Company is a department store chain in the New York City metropolitan area. At one point it was the oldest department store in America, operating for over 150 years from its founding in 1825 to its closing in 1975. At the company's peak, its flagship "Palace of Trade" in Manhattan – located at 881-887 Broadway at East 19th Street, through to 115 Fifth Avenue – was acknowledged to be the store which took the largest portion of the "carriage trade", in New York, serving the rich and elite of the city, such as the wives of Grover Cleveland, Andrew Carnegie, Thomas Edison, J.P. Morgan, John D. Rockefeller and Cornelius Vanderbilt.

== History ==
Arnold Constable & Company began as a small dry goods store at 91 Front Street in lower Manhattan opened in 1825 by Aaron Arnold, who had immigrated to the United States from the Isle of Wight. Arnold moved the business to a larger space on Pine Street, and took on partners, his nephews George and James Hearn, with the business being known as Arnold and Hearn until 1842, when the Hearns began their own store. James Mansell Constable was an employee of A. Arnold & Co. who would later marry Arnold's daughter, and he was taken on as a partner in 1842, with the store name changing to Arnold Constable & Company in 1853.

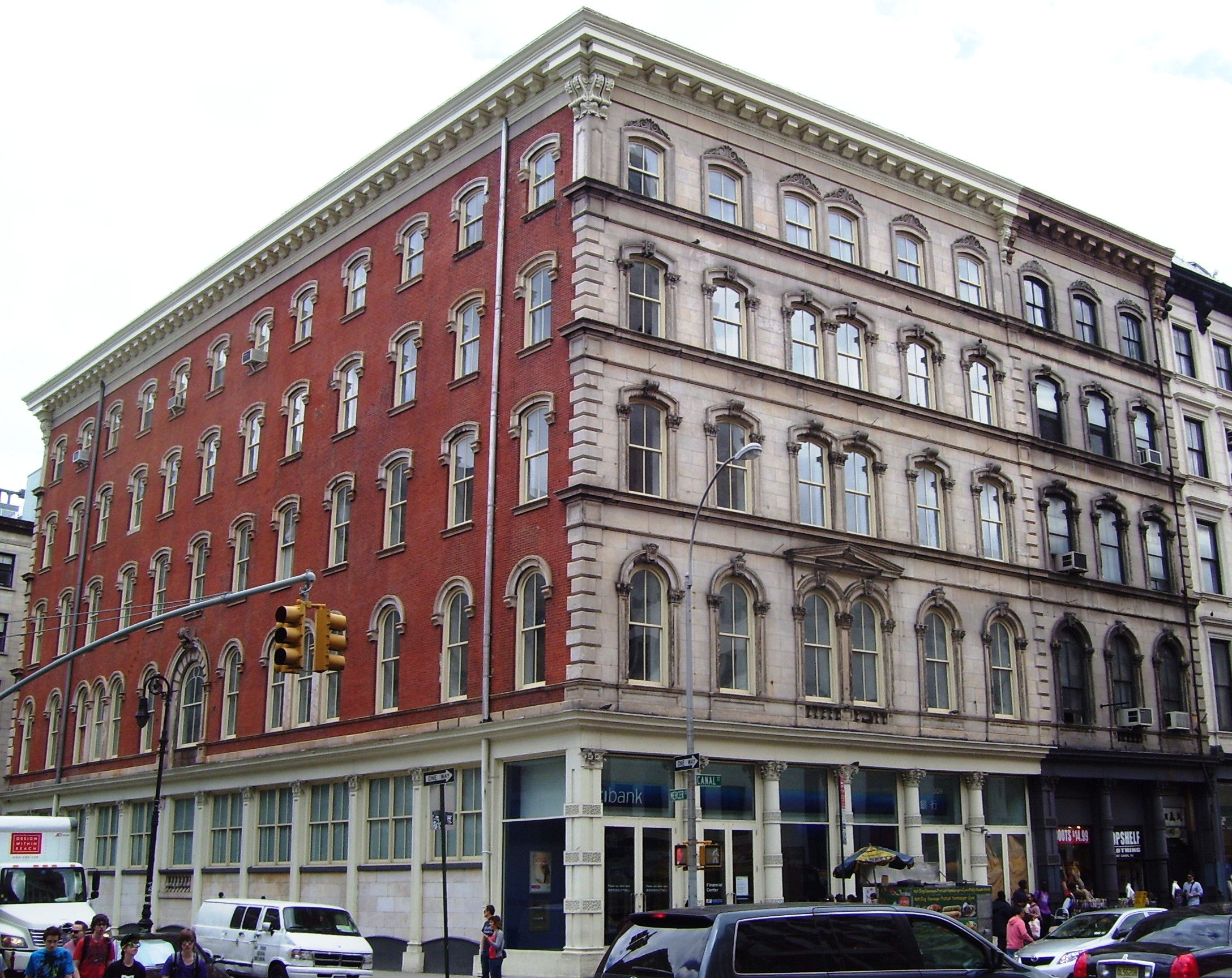
The Arnold Constable buildings at 307-311 Canal Street, with the red-brick Mercer Street facade. 309-311 (at the corner) is the original building, and 307 (center of block) was an addition.

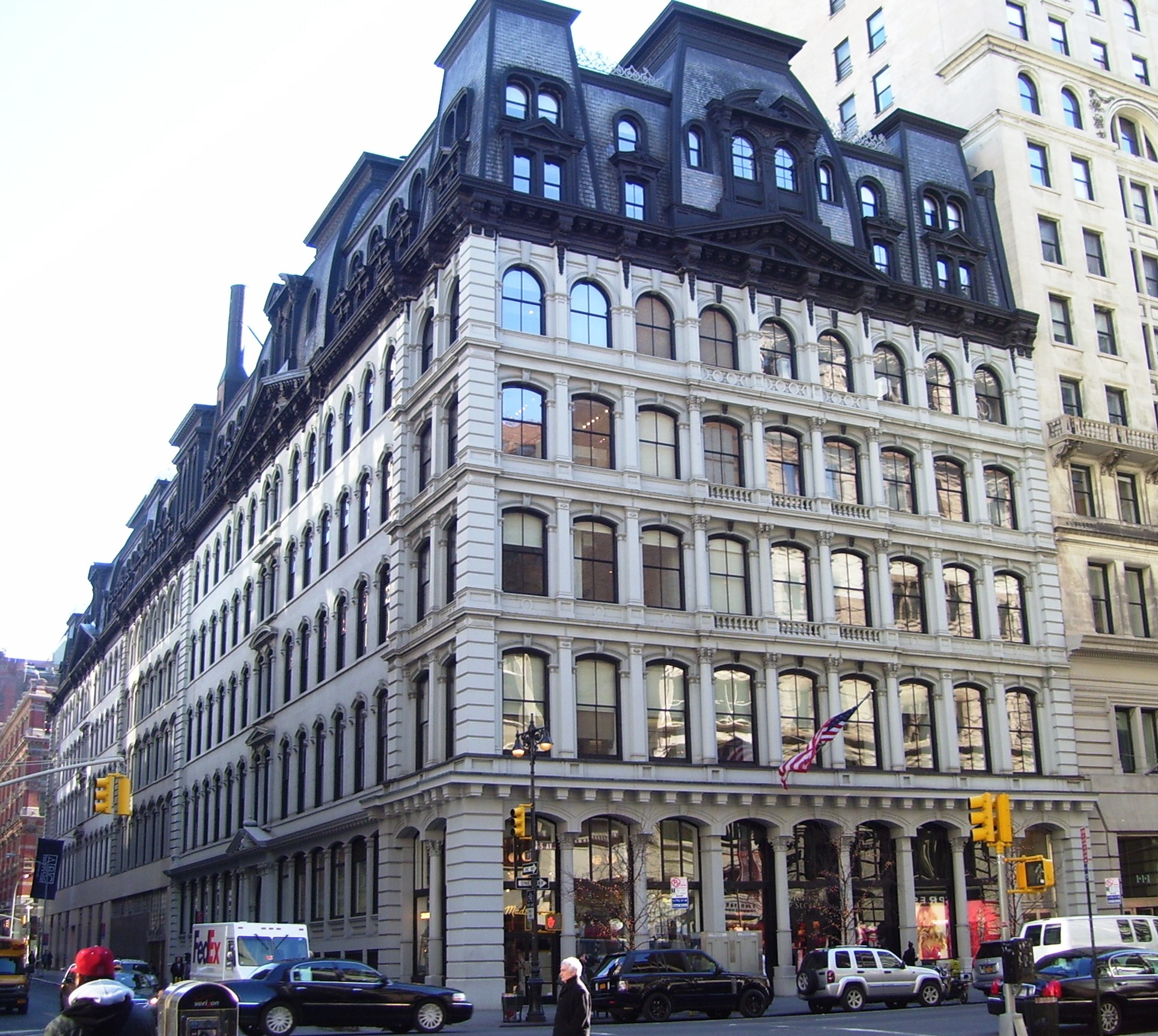
The upper floors of the Fifth Avenue facade, with the 19th Street facade on the left, going east towards Broadway

=== Migrations and expansions ===
In 1857 the store moved into a four-story white marble dry goods palace located at 309-311 Canal with frontages on Howard and Mercer Streets. A few years later as the country suffered from inflation, the store became one of the first to issue charge bills of credit to its customers each month instead of on a bi-annual basis. The firm continued to expand, and in 1862 added a five-story building at 307 Canal, as well as a fifth-story to the original building. The new additions were aesthetically integrated with the existing structure.

Recognized as an emporium for high-quality fashions, the store soon outgrew its Canal Street store, and in 1869 the firm erected a marble building on Broadway and East 19th Street, designed by Griffith Thomas, in an area which would become known as the "Ladies' Mile" Shopping District. The store was one of the pioneers of this shopping district, being among the first to move there. At the time, Arnold Constable was the second largest dry goods store in the city, and the building was called the "Palace of Trade" by newspapers. The building was expanded in 1872, adding carpets to its inventory and an upholstery department, and then extended all the way through the block to Fifth Avenue in 1876-77 to accommodate a wholesale department. Arnold Constable was then said to be "one of the largest business establishments in the world," and the business was so profitable that the New York Herald reported in 1897 that the company was the fifth largest real-estate owner in New York City. Among the properties the company owned was an office building at Fifth Avenue and East 18th Street, which connected to the firm's gigantic emporium.

Despite Arnold's death in 1876 the business continued to expand over the years until it was necessary to follow the city's uppertens population uptown and move into an even larger space at Fifth Avenue and 40th Street in 1914, the site of the former Vanderbilt mansion, and now the Mid-Manhattan Library of the New York Public Library.

=== European expansion ===
Clark Lawrence Sharpstein (1807-1880) started was a clerk at Arnold's nephew's store before moving to Arnold Constable when it was still on Canal Street. He quickly gained a senior position at the company, and was one of the drivers behind the move to Broadway. Arnold sent him on buying trips to Paris. In 1855, he established a Paris branch of Arnold Constable, becoming a partner in the overall firm. He continued to run the Paris store until his death, except for a one-year leave in 1870. The European business also included a London store; a lithograph depicting that store is in the collection of the Minneapolis Institute of Art.

=== Later years ===
In 1925, Arnold Constable joined with the specialty retailer Stewart & Company and expanded into the suburbs. In 1937, the first suburban branch opened in New Rochelle, New York. Later suburban expansions included locations in Hempstead and Manhasset on Long Island, Upper Darby Township, Pennsylvania and in New Jersey. Most branch stores were in downtown areas, often in small shopping centers. There were 11 to 12 American stores in the 1960s before business declined, a victim of the growth of malls over standalone stores. Eventually, the 10 suburban branches closed.

In 1961, Arnold, Constable sold its main store to the New York Public Library for its Mid-Manhattan Branch, but leased the first few floors back from the library to continue operating the store. By July 1974, it terminated the lease on all but the ground floor space. In March 1975, it closed down the main store altogether. Smaller mall stores continued and even expanded, under the NoName and Garment District brands.

The NoName stores literally had no name and no logo. A logo design was trademarked but never used. In the 1990s, remaining operations were sold to Canadian retailer Y M Inc., which now operates US chains Annie Sez, Mandee, and Afaze.

== The "Palace of Trade" ==
The second Arnold Constable flagship store now located in the Ladies' Mile Historic District began as the second of two twin buildings with marble facades, both designed by architect Griffith Thomas in Second Empire Commercial style, the other being for the retailer Edward Hoyt, who moved uptown to the area at about the same time as Arnold Constable. Later alterations to the buildings have obscured their identical beginning.

The Arnold Constable building grew by accretion over time, with sections divided by brick firewalls, but the interiors were kept as open as possible, supported by only cast-iron columns to allow for flexibility in displaying merchandise. In later years, sections would be connected together with courts naturally lit with skylights. As well as sales floors, the building contained warehouse storage space and workshops.

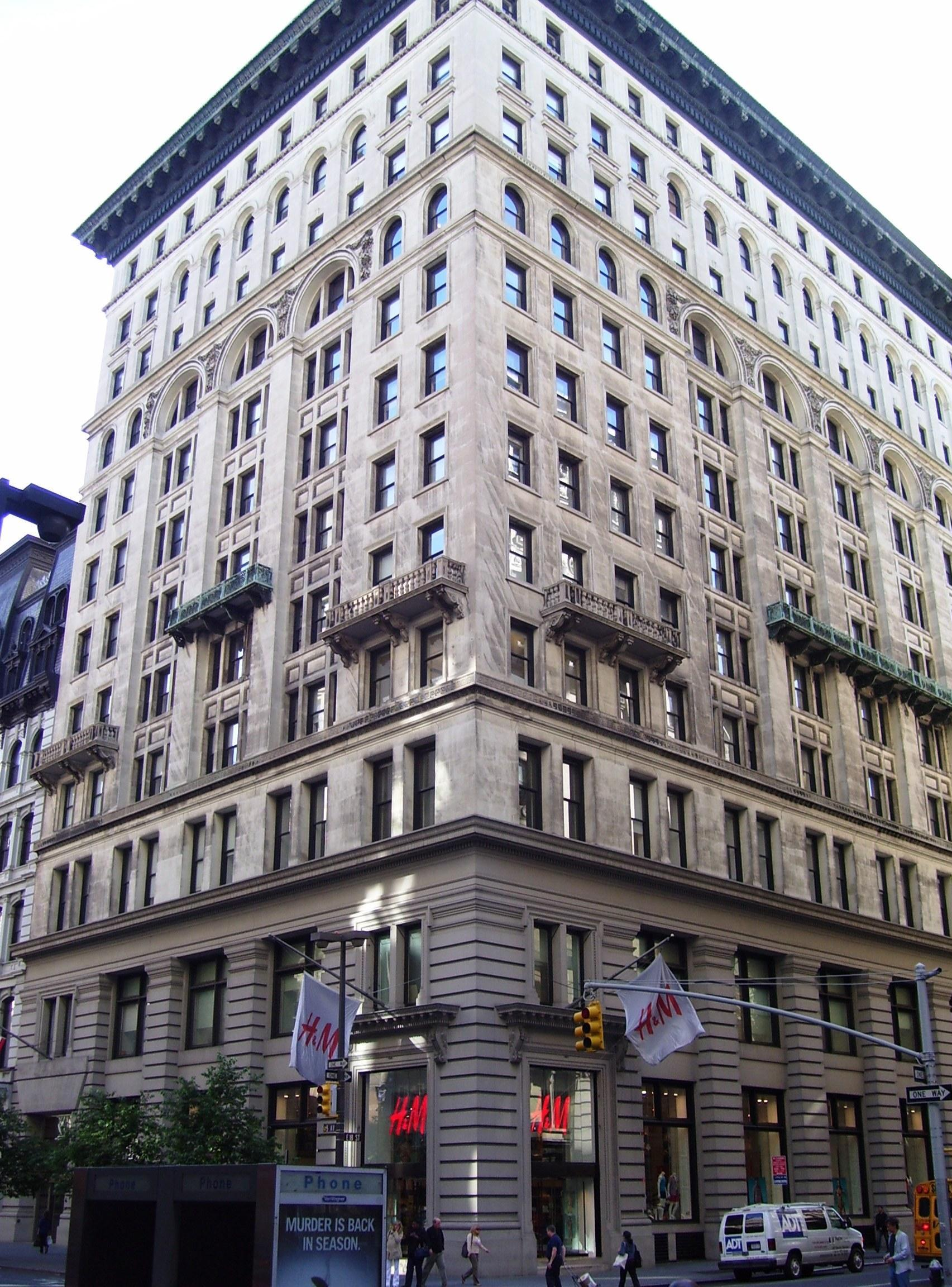
The Constable Building at 109-11 Fifth Avenue

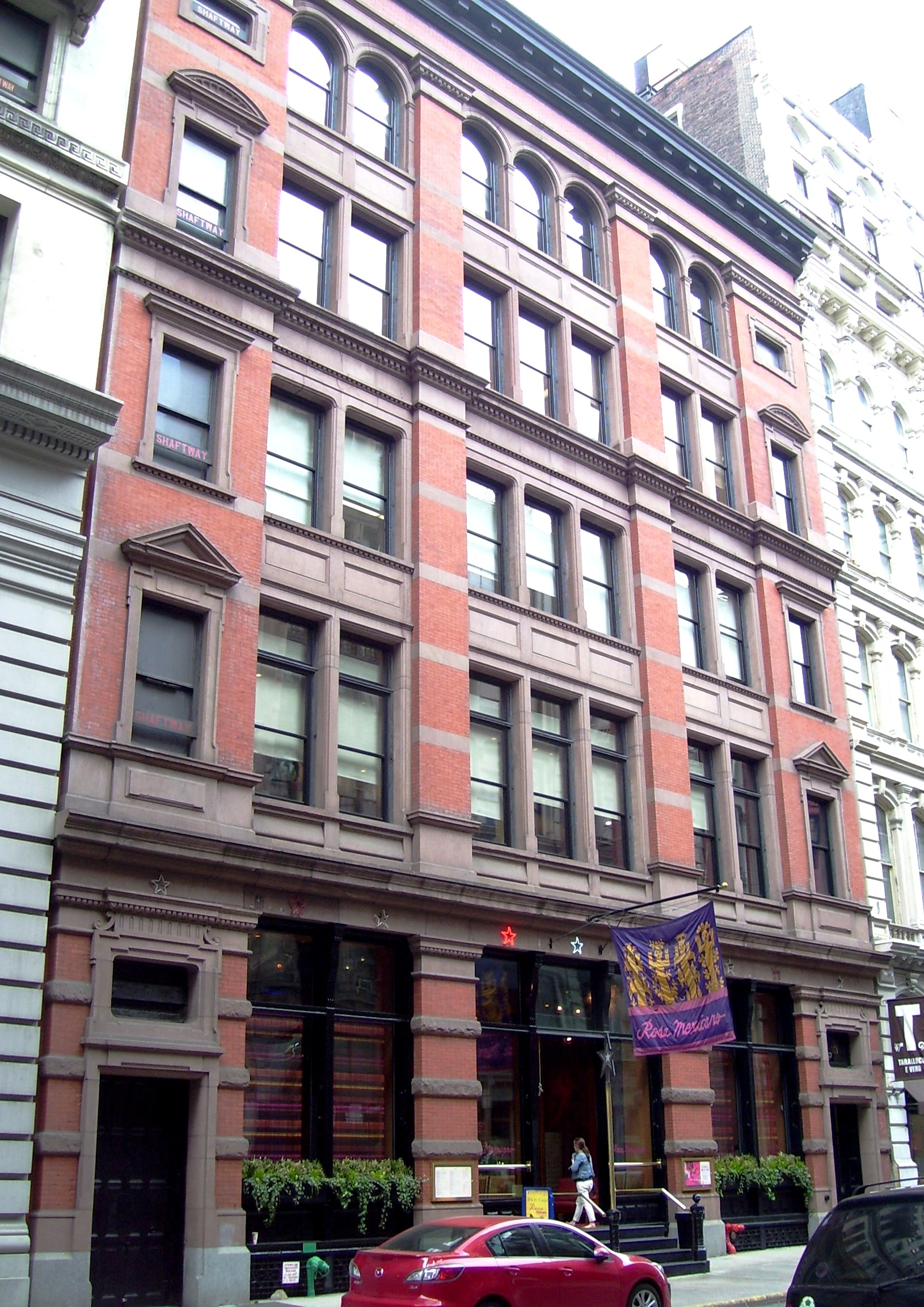
The annex building at 9-13 East 18th Street

The first major alteration to the building occurred in 1872, with a 50 feet (15 m) extension along 19th Street, adding a side entrance. The "miraculous" two-story mansard roof was also added at that time. Four years later, another 150 feet (46 m) was added, bringing the building to Fifth Avenue. Griffith Thomas did both extensions, and followed his original design, except that the ornamentation was done in cheaper cast iron rather than in the more expensive marble of the original building. In 1883-84, an annex was added on 18th Street, which was connected to the main building by a four-story bridge, and directly at the ground floor and basement. This building was designed by William Schickel in Renaissance Revival style. In 1894, a twelve-story tower, also designed by Schickel, was added at the southwest corner of Fifth Avenue and East 18th Street. Originally intended for ground floor retail with manufacturing above, the upper floors were redesignated for office use before the building was completed in 1895. After Arnold Constable & Company moved farther uptown in 1914, the building was converted, in 1915, for wholesale use.

The "Palace of Trade" was well-thought-of as architecture. The New York Herald said of the completed building: "By a nice arrangement and symmetrical adaptation of all its parts the massiveness of the structure is pleasantly relieved, and the building thus rendered, from an architectural point of view, one of the finest edifices in the city."
