= Ladies' Mile Historic District =

Historic district in Manhattan, New York

Coordinates: 40°44′24″N 73°59′31″W

Ladies' Mile Historic District

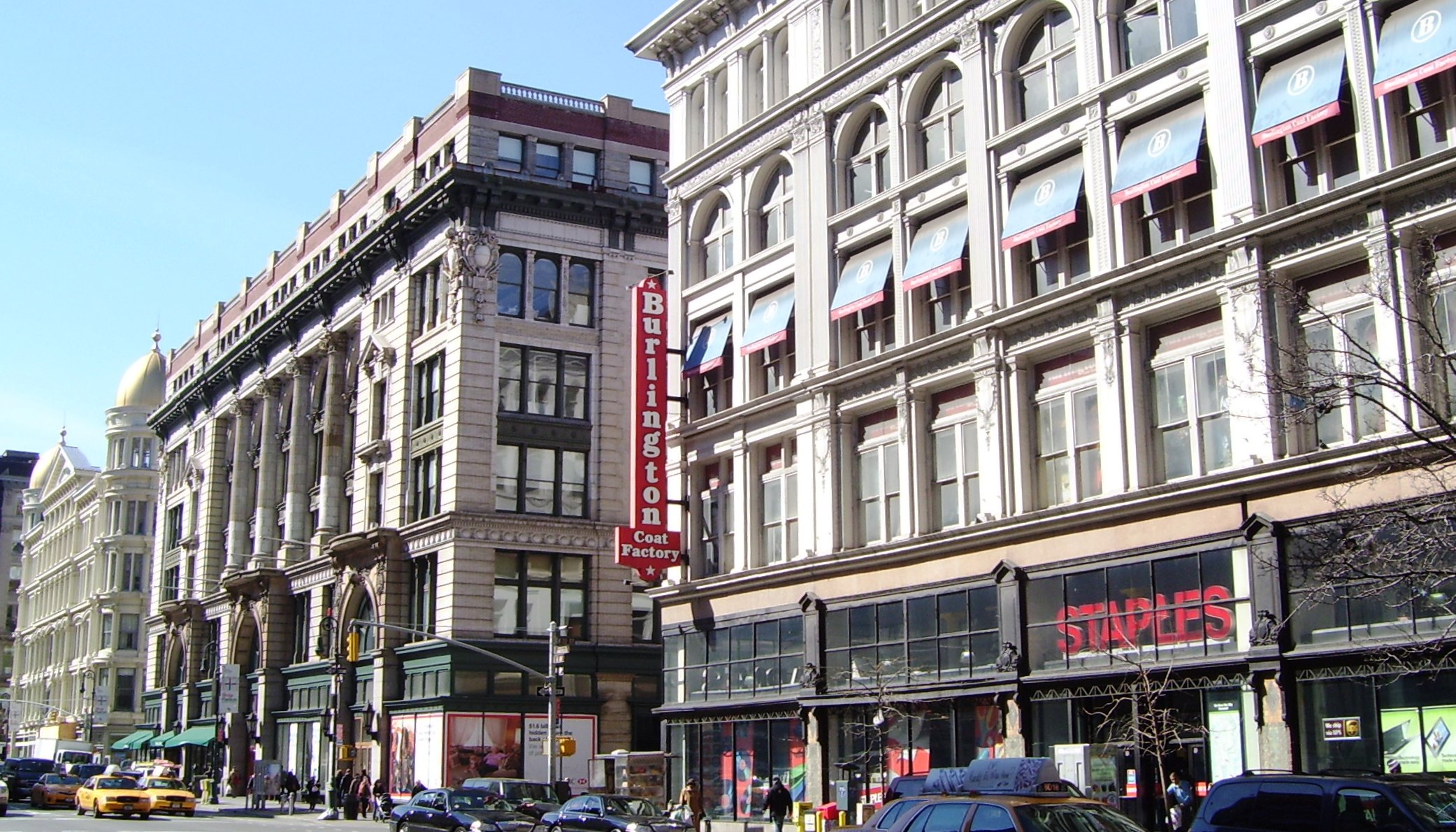
(left to right) Hugh O'Neill's, Adams and Ehrich Brothers dry goods emporia

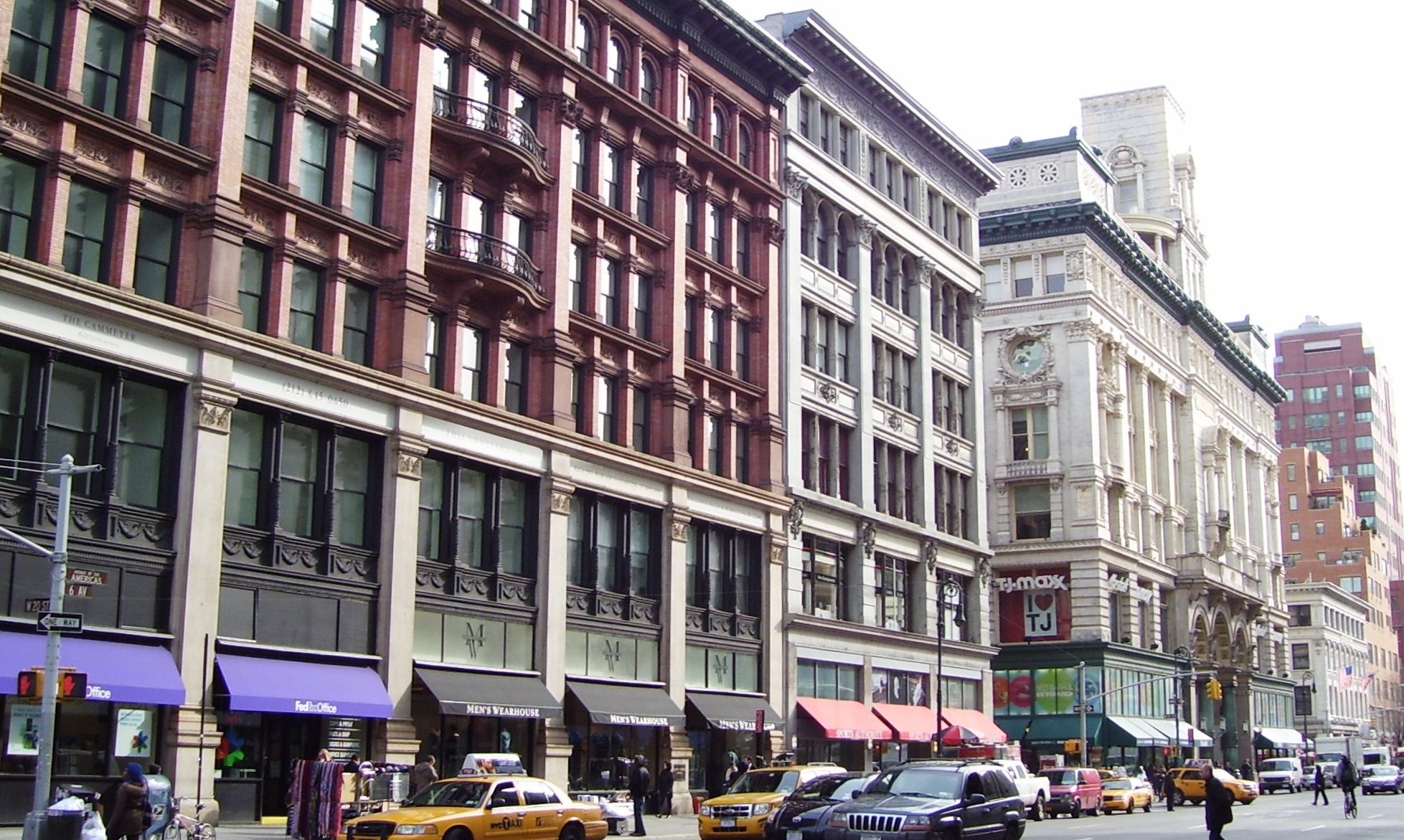
(left to right) Cammeyer, Alexander, Siegel-Cooper Dry Goods and Price buildings

The Ladies' Mile Historic District was a prime shopping district in Manhattan, New York City, at the end of the 19th century, serving the well-to-do "carriage trade" of the city. It was designated in May 1989, by the New York City Landmark Preservation Commission to preserve an irregular district of 440 buildings on 28 blocks and parts of blocks, from roughly 15th Street to 24th Street and from Park Avenue South to west of the Avenue of the Americas (Sixth Avenue). Community groups such as the Drive to Protect the Ladies' Mile District and the Historic Districts Council campaigned heavily for the status.

The Ladies' Mile Historic District contains mostly multi-story store and loft buildings. These buildings became common after 1899 when laws prohibited combined home and production areas without a permit, causing people who had previously worked at home to seek commercial spaces; the rise of unions which advocated for better working conditions also contributed to the development.

== History ==
Before becoming a shopping district, this area was residential and included rows of identical brownstone townhouses. These townhouses were replaced in the 1860s by department stores. The architectural style of this district shifted to Beaux-Arts, Neo-Renaissance, Romanesque Revival, and Queen Anne. Many of the new buildings used cast iron because it was cheap and could be made into any shape for extravagant decorations. The first to make this move was Arnold Constable in 1868, though others were quick to follow. The area first came to prominence in 1860, when the Prince of Wales stayed at the Fifth Avenue Hotel, located on the corner of Fifth Avenue and 23rd Street, signalling to New York's high society that the neighborhood was acceptable to royalty. Between the Civil War and World War I, the district was the location of some of New York's most famous department stores and upscale retailers, including B. Altman, Best & Co., Arnold Constable, Bergdorf Goodman, Gorham Silver, Thurn, W. & J. Sloane, Lord & Taylor, and Tiffany & Co. The Ladies' Mile also boasted upscale restaurants, booksellers and publishers, and offices and showrooms for piano manufacturers, such as in the Sohmer Piano Building. Performance venues in the district included the Academy of Music and Steinway Hall; the first location of the Metropolitan Museum of Art was there as well.

All of these attractions brought the rich and celebrities to the area, especially since the safety of the district allowed women to shop without male companions to accompany them. Ethel Barrymore, Isabella Stewart Gardner, Lillie Langtry and Lillian Russell were among those who might be found in the opulent shopping district at its zenith. The Ladies' Mile was termed so because women were the target consumers and its popularity made it a safe space for women to wander about without men. The construction of the elevated train known as the El on Sixth Avenue in 1878 made the Ladies' Mile more accessible to lower class consumers. Extravagant shoppers would continue to arrive in carriages. Residents of the area included Horace Greeley, Washington Irving, Samuel F. B. Morse, Emily Post, Edith Wharton and various members of the Roosevelt family.

When the district became more commercialized and less elite, many of the well-known residents moved uptown, and the upscale department stores and shops followed them. By the end of World War I, most of the buildings had been converted into warehouses, and lofts for manufacturers, as well as some residences. The majority of the buildings were not torn down, though, and by the 1980s they had started to be renovated and re-converted into large retail stores at street level, and sometimes above, so that the old shopping district is now one once again, albeit one which appeals to a very different clientele. Stores currently in the district include Bed Bath & Beyond (now closed), Burlington Coat Factory, The Container Store, Marshalls, Old Navy, Staples and Trader Joe's. There was also a Sports Authority, but it closed in 2016.

A major anchor of the district is Daniel H. Burnham's Flatiron Building, at Fifth Avenue and 23rd Street; most of the Ladies' Mile Historic District lies within the Manhattan neighborhood named after that building, the Flatiron District.

The Ladies' Mile gained the status of Historic District in 1989. This status came after much debate and would not have been possible without the advocacy group The Drive to Protect the Ladies' Mile District. This group was formed by Anthony C. Wood and Jack Taylor. The main opposers to this cause was the Real Estate Board of New York who thought the historic designation would make the lives of property owners too difficult. Margaret Moore and Truman Moore also wrote a book for the cause in 1983 titled End of the Road for Ladies' Mile? Their book contained photographs and essays to share the forgotten history of Ladies' Mile which helped garner support for the cause. This book along with exhibitions and walking tours of Ladies' Mile helped to raise public awareness about the history and significance of Ladies' Mile. Other important influences to the cause was the support of celebrities like Woody Allen, Diana Vreeland, Joseph Papp, and author Jack Finney.

== Notable buildings ==
- Church of the Holy Communion, 49 West 20th Street, 1846
- Arnold Constable Building, 881-887 Broadway, 1868–1877
- B. Altman Dry Goods Store, 621 Sixth Avenue, c.1877
- Gorham Manufacturing Company Building, 889–891 Broadway, 1884
- O'Neill Building, 655-671 Sixth Avenue, 1887–1890
- Scribner Building, 155 Fifth Avenue, 1893
- 9–11 East 16th Street, 1895–1896
- Siegel-Cooper Dry Goods Store, 616-632 Sixth Avenue, 1896
- Sohmer Piano Building, 170 Fifth Avenue, 1897–1898
- Flatiron Building, Broadway and Fifth Avenue at East 23rd Street, 1902–03
- Spero Building, 19–27 West 21st Street, 1907–1908
- Masonic Hall, 71 West 23rd Street, c. 1910
