= 900 Broadway =

Goelet Building
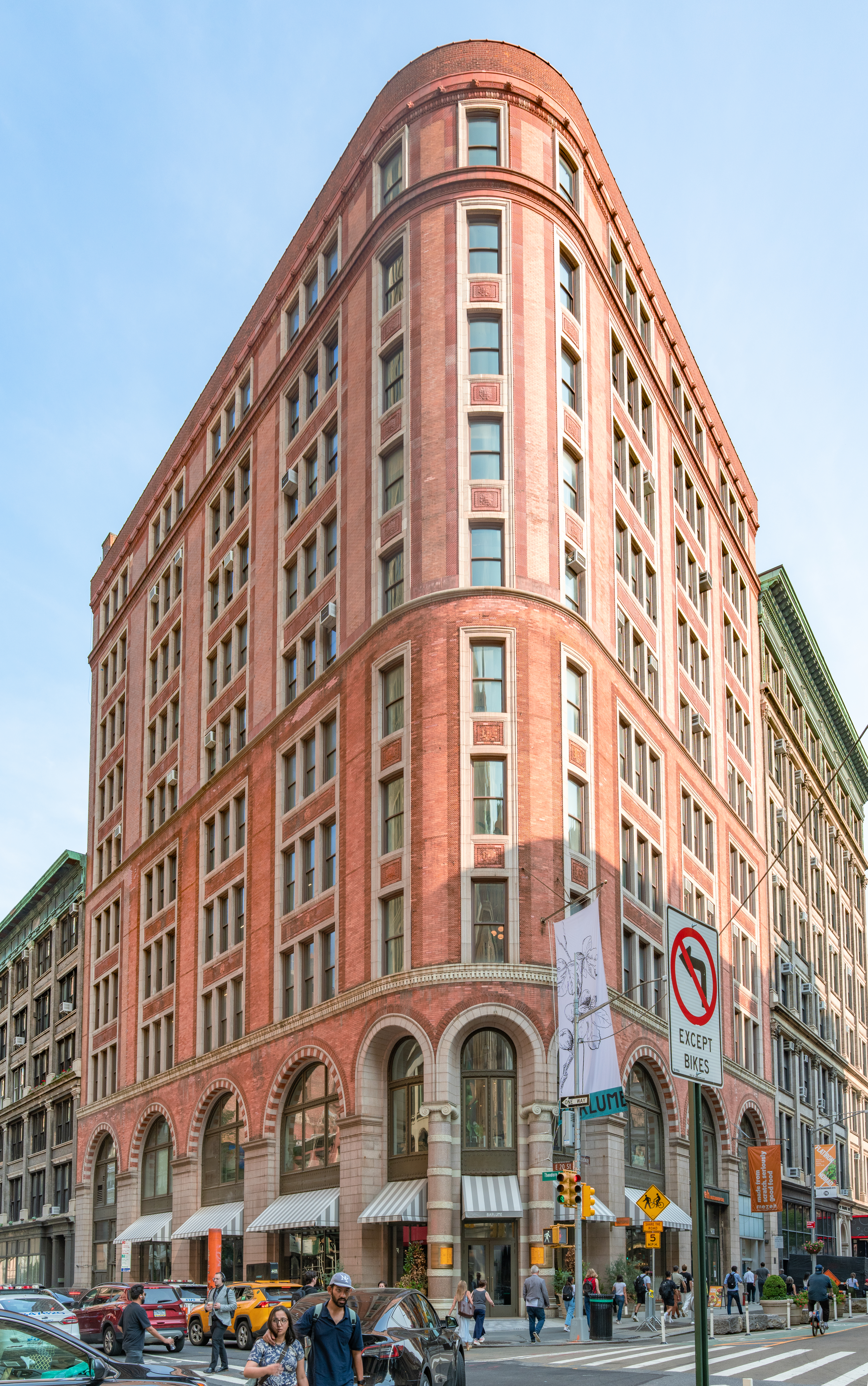
- (2025)
- Interactive map of the Goelet Building area

General information
- Location: 900 Broadway; Manhattan, New York City, New York
- Coordinates: 40.73923°N 73.98961°W
- Construction started: 1886
- Completed: 1887

Height
- Height: 139 feet (42 m)

Technical details
- Floor count: 10

Design and construction
- Architects: Stanford White of McKim, Mead & White; Maynicke & Franke Builder and Contractor: M.Reid & Company, Knickerbocker Building, 114-118 West 39th St, NYC, principal: William J. MacDonald

900 Broadway, also known as the Goelet Building, is a historical structure commissioned by members of the Goelet family located at the corner of Broadway and East 20th Street, in the Ladies' Mile Historic District of Manhattan, New York City. It was designed by Stanford White of McKim, Mead & White, and built in 1886–1887. The building was enlarged in 1905–06 by Maynicke & Franke.
