= Joan Kahn =

American novelist (1914–1994)

- Born: April 13, 1914; New York City, U.S.
- Died: October 12, 1994 (aged 80); New York City, U.S.
- Occupations: Editor, author
- Years active: 1938–1989
- Father: Ely Jacques Kahn
- Relatives: Ely Jacques Kahn Jr. (brother); Rena Rosenthal (aunt)

Joan Kahn (April 13, 1914 – October 12, 1994) was a New York City-based American author, anthologist, and editor, widely regarded as the preeminent mystery/suspense editor of her time. Described variously as the "doyenne of suspense," "the doyenne of mystery editors," and "publishing's grande dame of detective stories," Kahn first came to prominence during her extended reign (1946-1980) at Harper & Brothers (later Harper & Row), much of it spent creating and overseeing the longstanding "Harper Novel of Suspense" series. The Joan Kahn imprint, instituted during her Harper tenure, (Note: From its inception in 1956 until 1973, by far the most frequent version of this imprint was "A Joan Kahn-Harper Novel of Suspense." Starting in 1973, Harper experimented with a number of variations on this formula before abandoning it altogether in 1976, in favor of, simply, "A Joan Kahn Book," the designation that would accompany Kahn on her departure from Harper in 1979 and persist until her retirement ten years later.) soon became a sought-after imprimatur for mystery connoisseurs. Some of Kahn's more celebrated signings include John Creasey, Patricia Highsmith, Julian Symons, Dick Francis, and Tony Hillerman.

== Early life ==
Born and raised in New York City, Kahn was the eldest child of architect Eli Jacques Kahn and Elsie [Plaut] Kahn, and the sister of writer E.J. Kahn. An alumna of the Horace Mann School, the Yale School of Art, Barnard College, and the Art Students League of New York, Kahn wrote one children's book (which she also illustrated), 'Ladies and Gentlemen' said the Ringmaster (1938), (Note: For Kahn, the broadening of young readers' literary horizons was an ongoing concern. Belatedly following her 1938 debut, Kahn would author three additional children's books over the next four decades; moreover, many of the anthologies Kahn compiled over the years were specifically geared to the young adult market.) and two novels, To Meet Miss Long (1943) and Open House (1946), before embarking on her editorial career.

== Career ==
Neither immediate nor by design, Kahn's career change was, in fact, incremental, circuitous, and, on Kahn's part, entirely unwitting. Her initial employment at Harper was as a manuscript reader, only later being recruited by Frederick Lewis Allen as an editor at Harper's Magazine, before finally being brought back by Harper & Brothers to help overhaul the publisher's antiquated mystery department. Even after these respective promotions, Kahn had no inkling that her current livelihood was soon to become her life's work. Both her training and her aspirations at that time were primarily in the visual arts; aside from being a published author, Kahn was both a painter and a sculptor, as well as a stage and costume designer.

As she would tell The New York Times in 1968, Kahn initially viewed the Harper job as merely a "temporary thing," and never more so than when poring through roughly 200 previously rejected manuscripts, the reevaluation of which was one of the first tasks assigned the fledgling "Harper Novels of Suspense" team. However, when one of the handful she ended up accepting, The Horizontal Man by Helen Eustis, went on to win the Mystery Writers of America's annual Edgar Award for best first novel of 1947, Kahn quickly reconsidered. Her initial misgivings forgotten, Kahn aggressively pursued her newfound calling. Speaking with The Chicago Tribune in 1990, shortly after her retirement, she recalled:

I was so bloody lucky. Here I was, absolutely untrained and a dame. In those days, women didn't get many jobs in publishing. I was a snotty little girl... I was scared. I didn't know what I was doing. But I happened to be working for very bright people, who gave me my head. They allowed me to play.

This freedom allowed Kahn to wield extraordinary power, purging Harper of the majority of its largely hidebound roster of mystery writers, sparing only John Dickson Carr and Nicholas Blake (aka C. Day Lewis).

As an editor, Kahn was both devoted to her authors and extremely demanding – by her own account, "a nasty editor." She would not buy a book until it was fully fit to print; to that end, she worked long hours collaborating with her prospective authors. Moreover, no amount of previously successful collaborations between Kahn and a given author guaranteed publication of that author's next novel.

Appearing in The New York Times in November 1967, Anthony Boucher's enthusiastic review of the first of 11 suspense anthologies Kahn would produce over the following twenty years provides a concise summary of the previous twenty:

One of the best editors I know has never had her name on a book until this season. You know the reliable quality of the "Harper Novels of Suspense," and the disproportionate frequency with which they turn up on my Best-of-the-Year lists. Well, it is Joan Kahn who has, over the past two decades, made the Harper imprint meaningful in suspense, who made us acquainted with the giants of the modern English school (Julian Symons, Andrew Garve, Michael Gilbert, etc.), who taught John Creasey and the American public how to discover each other, who introduced probably the most important new suspense writers of the 1960s (Nicolas Freeling and Dick Francis) - and if her track record with American authors is less impressive, still John Ball, Ed Lacy and Elizabeth Linington are not precisely negligible.

In fact, few better examples could be found of Kahn's tough-love approach to editing than her 1965 collaboration with the then largely unknown John Ball; in coaxing from him the Edgar Award-winning In the Heat of the Night (itself the basis of the multi-award-winning film of the same name, starring Sidney Poitier and Rod Steiger), Kahn's accomplishment, at least as perceived by critic and fellow editor Otto Penzler, was Svengali-like:

Ball, in spite of creating the iconic Virgil Tibbs, was an excruciatingly bad writer, his prose more wooden than Sherwood Forest. He had a terrific idea for a novel, assigning a black policeman down South to work with a redneck sheriff, and sent it off to the greatest mystery editor who ever lived, Joan Kahn. She painstakingly worked with Ball to rewrite again and again, finally pulling a book out of him that was good enough to win the Edgar Allan Poe Award.

Two of Kahn's key seventies signings, Tony Hillerman and Joseph Hansen, not only unleashed two hitherto frustrated novelists, but also introduced two groundbreaking American protagonists, Hillerman's Navajo Tribal Police Lieutenant Joe Leaphorn and Joseph Hansen's unapologetically gay insurance investigator Dave Brandstetter. Looking back in 1985, fifteen years after the fact, and again almost two decades later, Hansen recalls both the initial agonizing delay in publication and the ensuing mutual incredulity when Kahn finally came to the rescue:

But before there were reviews, there had to be a published book. And that took some doing. It also took three years. Publishers were leery of my matter-of-fact, non-apologetic approach to a subject that the rule book said had to be treated sensationally or not at all. At last a brave lady named Joan Kahn took a chance on me. When Kahn, magisterial mystery editor at Harper & Row, accepted this novel for publication, she wrote my agent, "Where's this writer been hiding?" I had to laugh to keep from crying. Hiding was the last thing I wanted to do... I'd been writing for 46 years.

Hillerman had an analogous tale to tell (a three-year travail, complete with Kahn cast as the deus ex machina), recounted shortly after his death by Jack Adrian in The Independent:

His first book, The Blessing Way (1970), took him three years to write and then three months to rewrite after Joan Kahn, the mystery editor at Harper's, sent him a detailed critique, telling him to "beef up" one of his secondary characters. "Ironically," Hillerman said, "that character was Joe Leaphorn. I'd originally had a white anthropologist as the protagonist. I owe my career to Joan Kahn."

The exact circumstances of Kahn's departure from Harper & Row in early 1980 remain unclear; contemporary press accounts offer no specifics. For her part, speaking with the Los Angeles Times in December of that year, Kahn suggests the move was her choice, a reluctant response to Harper's increasingly bottom-line orientation:

I left Harper with my heart breaking, but it was getting bigger and bigger. Since the only thing I really give a damn about is the authors, and they weren't being taken care of, I thought I'd better go and find a place that would love them more. I think little places can afford to do that.

However, in a 2011 obituary for editor Ruth Cavin, a recollection by Thomas McCormack (formerly Kahn's colleague at Harper, and later the CEO at St. Martin's Press, where Kahn would finish her career), is cited to the effect that, in 1980, Kahn, then 65, had simply been "retired" by her longtime employers. In any event, after leaving Harper, Kahn worked briefly at Ticknor & Fields, and then E.P. Dutton, before landing, in early 1983, at St Martin's, where she would remain until her retirement six years later. Accompanying Kahn through her many relocations were a number of her more recent discoveries from Harper, including Jack S. Scott, Richard Bulliet, E. Richard Johnson, Herbert Resnicow, Jonathan Gash, and Jane Langton, as well two Ticknor signatories, H. Paul Jeffers and Patrick McGinley.

Towards the end of her life, Kahn received two special awards from the Mystery Writers of America – first, in 1985, the Ellery Queen Award for "outstanding people in the mystery-publishing industry," and, on the occasion of her retirement in 1989, a special Edgar Award in recognition of Kahn's distinguished career. That same year, Kahn received a special Anthony Award from Bouchercon for Distinguished Contribution.

== Personal life ==
Kahn never married and had no children. After a brief illness, she died on October 12, 1994, in Manhattan. Kahn was survived by her younger sister, artist Olivia Kahn, and three nephews. Olivia had also been Joan's colleague at Harper, (Note: Not quite five years after her sister's death, Olivia's employment at Harper would help engender a minor literary bombshell, when, interviewed by Graham Lord, the unauthorized biographer of celebrity jockey cum best-selling author Dick Francis (one of her sister's most celebrated discoveries), Olivia confirmed that: Joan got letters from Dick, and the person who wrote those letters could not in my view have been the person who wrote the books. I can't think of any other situation in which this – deception is the wrong word – in which this kind of collaboration was kept under cover. According to Lord, Mary Francis had all but conceded as much almost two decades earlier, but begged that her remarks remain confidential, adding: Yes, Dick would like me to have all the credit for them but believe me, Graham, it's much better for everyone, including the readers, to think that he writes them because they're taut, masculine books that might otherwise lose their credibility. For his part, Mr. Francis insisted he had written the stories, but had, in each instance, received his wife's invaluable assistance both before and after the fact, in terms of research and editing, respectively. Mrs. Francis likewise took issue with Lord, though, curiously, her rebuttal addressed the basis for Lord's assertions ("Graham Lord is guessing and he has no hard facts") rather than the assertions themselves ("The amount of sharing we do is private"). At the time of his wife's death one year later, Francis did not depart significantly from his previous statements (stressing again that she was "a great researcher" who "helped" with his "English"), adding: I couldn't have written the books without her. She had a university degree and education, which I didn't have. She was in a way a co-author, but she wouldn't take credit. I don't really know why. She didn't really like publicity, and she was quite happy for me to have all the credit. A piece by Ann Carter, published in The Fort Lauderdale Sun Sentinel shortly after the Lord biography, while downplaying the importance - not to mention the possibility - of determining exactly who contributed what, does lend strong support to Kahn's contention that Mrs. Francis' contribution extended well beyond what had been publicly acknowledged (as do the contemporaneous comments of Francis family friend Brough Scott, broadcast on BBC Radio 5 Live, as well as fellow crime writer H.R.F. Keating's brief review of the Lord biography). Citing numerous passages which seem to reflect a typically 'feminine' viewpoint (such as attention to makeup, hairstyle, wardrobe and interior decor, as well as the presence of strong female characters, often in traditionally male-assigned roles), Carter recounts an earlier conversation with the author: When I asked about some of these factors in a 1984 interview, Francis said – not once, but several times – that they were to "fill up the book." That sounds like the kind of answer one might give when one doesn't know the answer.) acting as an advisor and manuscript reader, and shortly after her sister's death, would contribute many of her papers both to Bowling Green State University and to Joan's Alma mater Yale.

== Published works ==
=== Author ===
==== Children's books ====
- "Ladies and Gentlemen," said the Ringmaster (1938)
- Seesaw (1964)
- You Can't Catch Me (1976)
- Hi, Jock, Run Around the Block (1978)

==== Novels ====
- To Meet Miss Long (1943)
- Open House (1946)

=== Editor ===
==== Anthologies ====
- The Edge of the Chair (1967)
- Hanging By a Thread (1969)
- Some Things Dark and Dangerous (1970)
- Some Things Fierce and Fatal (1971)
- Some Things Strange and Sinister (1973)
- Trial and Terror (1973)
- Open at Your Own Risk (1975)
- Some Things Weird and Wicked (1976)
- Chilling and Killing (1978)
- Handle With Care: Frightening Stories (1985)
- Ready or Not: Here Come Fourteen Frightening Stories! (1987)
