= Flatiron Building =

Skyscraper in Manhattan, New York

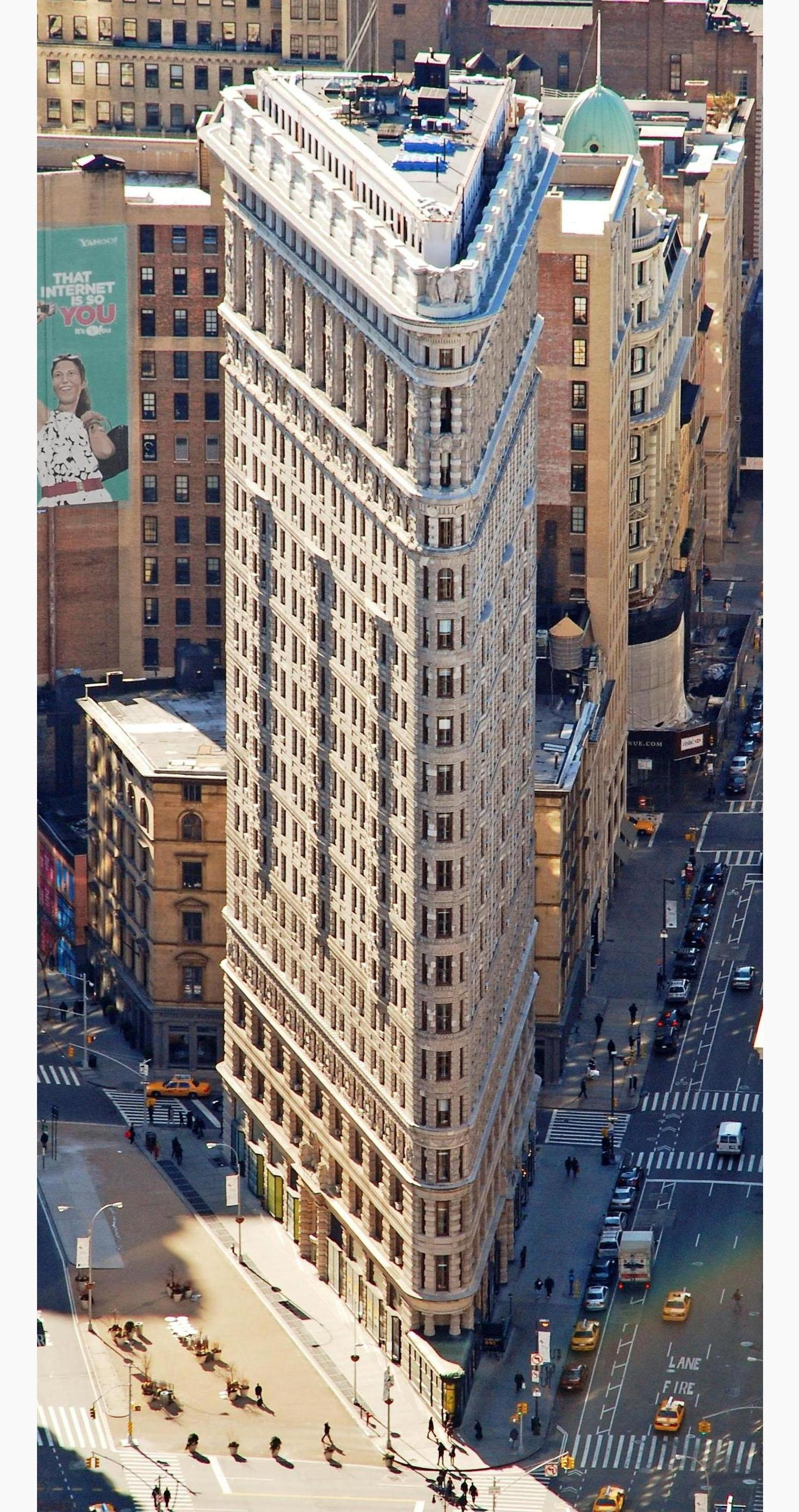
- The Flatiron Building in January 2010
- Former names: Fuller Building

General information
- Type: Residential
- Architectural style: Renaissance Revival
- Location: 175 Fifth Avenue, Manhattan, New York, United States
- Construction started: May 1901
- Completed: June 1902
- Opened: October 1, 1902
- Owner: Sorgente Group; GFP Real Estate; Newmark; ABS Real Estate; The Brodsky Organization

Height
- Architectural: 307 ft (93.6 m)

Technical details
- Floor count: 22
- Floor area: 255,000 sq ft (23,690.3 m^{2})

Design and construction
- Architects: D. H. Burnham & Co. (Daniel Burnham and Frederick P. Dinkelberg)
- Main contractor: George A. Fuller Construction Co.

Website
- theflatironbuilding.com
- Flatiron Building
- U.S. National Register of Historic Places
- U.S. National Historic Landmark
- New York State Register of Historic Places
- New York City Landmark
- Location within Manhattan Location within New York City Location within New York Location within the United States
- Coordinates: 40°44′28″N 73°59′23″W
- NRHP reference No.: 79001603
- NYSRHP No.: 06101.000437
- NYCL No.: 0219

Significant dates
- Added to NRHP: November 20, 1979
- Designated NHL: June 29, 1989
- Designated NYSRHP: June 23, 1980
- Designated NYCL: September 20, 1966

The Flatiron Building (originally the Fuller Building) is a 22-story, 307-foot-tall (93.6 m) steel-framed triangular building at 175 Fifth Avenue in the Flatiron District neighborhood of Manhattan in New York City, New York, US. Designed by Daniel Burnham and Frederick P. Dinkelberg, it opened in 1902. The building sits on a triangular block formed by Fifth Avenue, Broadway, and East 22nd Street—where the building's 87-foot (27 m) back end is located—with East 23rd Street grazing the triangle's northern (uptown) peak. The name "Flatiron" derives from its triangular shape, which recalls that of a cast-iron clothes iron.

The Flatiron Building was developed as the headquarters of construction firm Fuller Company, which acquired the site from the Newhouse family in May 1901. Construction proceeded rapidly, and the building opened on October 1, 1902; it originally stood 285 feet (87 m) tall. In its early days, it was sometimes called "Burnham's Folly" because of locals' skepticism of the building's structural integrity. The building was originally 20 floors; a "cowcatcher" retail space (a low attached building named for its resemblance to the device on rail locomotives) and penthouse were added shortly after the building's opening. The Fuller Company sold the building in 1925 to an investment syndicate. The Equitable Life Assurance Society took over the building after a foreclosure auction in 1933 and sold it to another syndicate in 1945.

Helmsley-Spear managed the building for much of the late 20th century, renovating it several times. The Newmark Group started managing the building in 1997. Ownership was divided among several companies, which started renovating the building again in 2019. Jacob Garlick agreed to acquire the Flatiron Building at an auction in early 2023, but failed to pay the required deposit, and three of the four existing ownership groups took over the building. In October 2023, the building's owners announced that it would be converted to residential condominiums; the project was completed in 2026.

The Flatiron Building's facade is divided vertically into three sections, similarly to the components of a classical column. The three-story base is clad with limestone, while the upper stories are clad with glazed terracotta. The building's steel frame, designed by structural engineering firm Purdy and Henderson, was intended to withstand four times the maximum wind force of the аrea. Called "one of the world's most iconic skyscrapers and a quintessential symbol of New York City", the building anchors the south (downtown) end of Madison Square and the north (uptown) end of the Ladies' Mile Historic District. The neighborhood around it is called the Flatiron District after its signature, iconic building. (Note: For its iconic status, see Koolhaas 1994, p. 72 and Goldberger 1981, p. 38; both noted in this context in Zukowsky & Saliga 1984, p. 79 note 3) The building was designated a New York City landmark in 1966, was added to the National Register of Historic Places in 1979, and was designated a National Historic Landmark in 1989.

== Site ==
The Flatiron Building occupies a triangular city block in Manhattan, New York City, New York, US. It is bounded by Fifth Avenue to the west, Broadway to the east, and 22nd Street to the south. The western and eastern facades converge, forming a "peak" at its northern corner where Fifth Avenue and Broadway intersect with East 23rd Street. The shape of the site arises from Broadway's diagonal alignment relative to the Manhattan street grid. (Note: This was one of four northward-facing plots south of 59th Street that were formed by the convergence of Broadway, another avenue, and a crosstown street. A park was built on the plot south of Herald Square, at 34th Street and Sixth Avenue. One Times Square was built on the triangular plot south of Times Square, at 42nd Street and Seventh Avenue. The curved site south of Columbus Circle, at 59th Street and Eighth Avenue, is now occupied by 2 Columbus Circle.) The site measures 197.5 feet (60.2 m) on Fifth Avenue, 214.5 feet (65.4 m) on Broadway, and 86 feet (26 m) on 22nd Street. Above the ground level, all three corners of the triangle are rounded. Despite the building's name, the site is shaped like a scalene right triangle; a genuine flatiron is shaped like an isosceles triangle.

Buildings directly across the street from the Flatiron Building include the Toy Center to the north, the Sohmer Piano Building to the southwest, the Scribner Building to the south, and Madison Green to the southeast. Entrances to the New York City Subway's 23rd Street station, served by the R and W trains, are adjacent to the building. The Flatiron Building is within the Ladies' Mile Historic District, a preservation which extends between 15th Street (to the south) and 24th Street (to the north).

=== Previous structures ===
The St. Germain Hotel (alternatively spelled St. Germaine) was built by 1855 (Note: Alexiou 2010, p. 26, cites the St. Germain Hotel as having been built in 1855. Landmarks Preservation Commission 1989, p. 151, meanwhile, gives a different date of between 1853 and 1854.) on the south end of the lot. It was one of several hotels built in the neighborhood during the mid-19th century. Amos Eno purchased the entire block in 1857 (Note: Tauranac 1985, p. 53, gives a differing date of 1855 for Eno's purchase.) for $32,000, (Note: Equivalent to $871,000 in 2025) and he shortly built the Fifth Avenue Hotel on a site diagonally across from it. At some point after 1880, Eno tore down the St. Germain Hotel and replaced it with a seven-story apartment building, the Cumberland. (Note: Architectural historian Christopher Gray says that the St. Germain remained in place but was "renamed the Cumberland House around 1880".) On the remainder of the lot, he built four three-story buildings for commercial use. This left four stories of the Cumberland's northern face exposed, which Eno rented out to advertisers, including The New York Times, which installed a sign made up of electric lights.

The sign, the first of its kind in New York City, was a precursor to the Great White Way near Times Square. Eno later put a canvas screen on the wall, projecting images from a magic lantern atop one of his smaller buildings, where he alternately presented advertisements and interesting pictures. Both the Times and the New-York Tribune began using the screen for news bulletins, and on election nights tens of thousands of people would gather in Madison Square, waiting for the latest results.

The site came to be known by many names, including "Eno's flatiron", "Eno's corner", and "the cow catcher". By the 1890s, the Eno family earned $42,000 a year from the site. (Note: Equivalent to $1,371,000 in 2025) Although Eno was one of the largest landowners in New York City by 1894, he rejected all offers to purchase the flatiron site during his lifetime. After his death in 1899, his assets were liquidated, and the lot went up for sale. The New York State Assembly appropriated $3 million for the city to buy it, (Note: Equivalent to $98.0 million in 2025) but this fell through when a newspaper reporter discovered that the plan was a graft scheme by Tammany Hall boss Richard Croker. Instead, the lot was bought at auction by William Eno, one of Amos's sons, for $690,000 in April 1899. (Note: Equivalent to $22.5 million in 2025) This was more than 20 times what the elder Eno had paid for the property four decades earlier.

In May 1899, just three weeks after William had acquired the flatiron lot, he resold it to Samuel and Mott Newhouse for $750,000 (Note: Equivalent to $24.5 million in 2025) or around $801,000. (Note: Equivalent to $26.2 million in 2025) At the time, the Newhouse family did not consider a skyscraper on the flatiron site to be feasible because of engineering and architectural constraints. The Newhouses intended to erect a 12-story building with retail shops at street level and bachelor apartments above. They announced plans for the building in November 1900, but the plans were not executed, even though the value of land lots in the city was increasing. At the time, eight- to ten-story office and commercial buildings were being developed in the neighborhood, replacing older, shorter commercial structures.

== History ==
At the beginning of March 1901, media outlets reported that the Newhouse family was planning to sell "Eno's flatiron" for about $2 million to Cumberland Realty Company, (Note: Equivalent to $61.7 million in 2025) an investment partnership created by Harry S. Black, CEO of the Fuller Company. The Fuller Company was the first true general contractor that dealt with all aspects of buildings' construction (except for design), and they specialized in erecting skyscrapers. They were particularly experienced in designing towers on small sites, such as the Trinity and United States Realty Buildings in Lower Manhattan. Black intended to construct a new headquarters building on the site, despite the recent deterioration of the surrounding neighborhood. At the end of that March, the Fuller Company organized a subsidiary to develop a building on the site. The sale was finalized in May 1901.

=== Development ===
==== Plans and site-clearing ====
Black hired Daniel Burnham's architectural firm to design a 21-story building on the site in February 1901. It was to be Burnham's first in New York City, the tallest building in Manhattan north of the Financial District, and the city's first skyscraper north of Union Square (at 14th Street). The Northwestern Salvage and Wrecking Company began razing the site in May 1901, after the majority of existing tenants' leases had expired. Most of the Cumberland's remaining tenants readily vacated the building in exchange for monetary compensation. The sole holdout was Winfield Scott Proskey, a retired colonel who refused to move out until his lease expired later that year. Cumberland Realty unsuccessfully attempted to deactivate Proskey's water and gas supply, and Proskey continued to live in the Cumberland while contractors demolished all of the surrounding apartments. By the end of May 1901, Cumberland Realty discovered that Proskey was bankrupt, and his creditors took over the lease and razed the rest of the Cumberland that June.

The New York Herald published an image of the site on June 2, 1901, with the caption "Flatiron Building". The project's structural engineer, Corydon Purdy, filed plans for a 20-story building on the site that August. The Flatiron Building was not the first building of its triangular ground-plan, although it was the largest at the time of its completion. Earlier buildings with a similar shape include one built in 1867 in Syracuse, New York; a triangular Roman temple built on a similarly constricted site in the city of Verulamium, Britannia; Bridge House, Leeds, England (1875); the I.O.O.F. Centennial Building (1876) in Alpena, Michigan; and the English-American Building in Atlanta (1897). The Real Estate Record and Guide published a drawing of the building in October 1901; the drawing, captioned "The Cumberland", was very similar to the Flatiron Building's final design. (Note: The drawing mistakenly cited Bruce Price as the building's architect, since the details were very similar to those in Price's American Surety Building.)

==== Construction ====
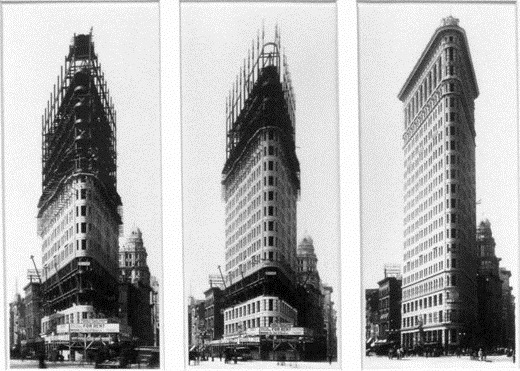
Construction phases

The Atlantic Terra Cotta Company began producing architectural terracotta pieces for the building in August 1901. Around the same time, the New York City Department of Buildings (DOB) indicated that it would refuse to approve Purdy's initial plans unless the engineers submitted detailed information about the framework, fireproofing, and wind-bracing systems. Purdy complied with most of the DOB's requests, submitting detailed drawings and documents, but he balked at the department's requirement that the design include fire escapes. For reasons that are unclear, the DOB dropped its requirement that the building contain fire escapes.

The building code originally mandated metal-framed windows, which would have increased the cost of construction. The city's Board of Building Commissioners had granted an exemption to Black's syndicate, prompting allegations of favoritism. A new Buildings Department commissioner was appointed at the beginning of 1902, promising to enforce city building codes; this prompted general contractor Thompson–Starrett Co. to announce that the building's window frames would be made of fireproof wood with a copper coating.

The building's steel frame was manufactured by the American Bridge Company in Pennsylvania. The frame had risen above street level by January 1902. Construction was then halted for several weeks, first because of a delay in steel shipments, then because of a blizzard that occurred in February. Further delays were caused by a strike at the factory of Hecla Iron Works, which was manufacturing elevators and handrails for the building. The steel was so meticulously pre-cut that, according to The New York Times, the steel pieces could be connected "without so much as the alteration of a bored hole, or the exchange of a tiny rivet". Workers used air-powered tools to rivet the steel beams together, since such equipment was more efficient than steam-powered tools at conducting power over long distances. The frame was complete by February 1902, and workers began installing the terracotta tiles as the framework of the top stories was being finished. By mid-May, the building was half-covered by terracotta tiling. The terracotta work was completed the next month, and the scaffolding in front of the building was removed. In total, the developers invested $1.5 million in the project. (Note: Equivalent to $45.1 million in 2025)

Officials of the Fuller Company announced in August 1902 that the structure would be officially named after George A. Fuller, founder of the Fuller Company and "father of the skyscraper", who had died two years earlier. By then, the site had been known as the "flatiron" for several years; according to Christopher Gray of The New York Times, Burnham's and Fuller's architectural drawings even labeled the structure as the "Flatiron Building". Although the Fuller name was used for some time after the building's completion, locals persisted in calling it the Flatiron, to the displeasure of Harry Black and the building's contractors. In subsequent years, the edifice officially came to be known as the Flatiron Building, and the Fuller name was transferred to a newer 40-story structure at 597 Madison Avenue.

=== Fuller Company ownership ===
In the weeks before the official opening, the Fuller Company distributed six-page brochures to potential tenants and real-estate brokers. The brochures advertised the building as being "ready for occupancy" on October 1, 1902. The Fuller Company took the 19th floor for its headquarters. The Flatiron Building was the seventh-tallest building in Manhattan, behind the Park Row Building, Manhattan Life Insurance Building, St. Paul Building, American Surety Building, American Tract Building, and Empire Building. Because it stood higher than other nearby structures, when New York City Fire Department officials tested the building's standpipes in November 1902, they said the structure "would be of great aid in fighting the fire" in any surrounding buildings.

Following the building's completion, the surrounding neighborhood evolved from an entertainment district to a commercial hub. Initially, the building was topped by a flagpole, which was maintained by one man, "Steeplejack" Kay, for four decades. Henry Clay Frick expressed interest in purchasing the structure in 1904 for $5 million, (Note: Equivalent to $139.9 million in 2025) but he ultimately withdrew his offer.

==== Modifications ====
Flatiron Building in 1911

The building originally stood 20 stories high. During the building's construction, Black had suggested that the "cowcatcher" retail space be installed at the northern tip of the building, occupying 93 square feet (8.6 m^{2}) of unused space at the extreme northern end of the lot. This would maximize use of the building's lot and produce some retail income. Burnham initially refused to consider Black's suggestion, and, in April 1902, Black asked a draftsman at the Fuller Company to draw up plans for the retail space. Black submitted plans for the annex to the DOB in May 1902. The DOB rejected the initial plans because the walls were too thin, but the department approved a revised proposal that June, to Burnham's disapproval. The retail space in the "cowcatcher" was leased by United Cigar Stores.

Another addition to the building not in the original plan was the penthouse, which was constructed after the rest of the building had been completed. By 1905, the Fuller Company needed to expand its technical drawing facilities. As a result, the company filed plans for a penthouse with the New York City Department of Buildings that March. The penthouse would cost $10,000 (Note: Equivalent to $277,000 in 2025) and would include fireproof partitions and a staircase from the existing 20th floor. The penthouse, intended for use as artists' studios, was quickly rented out to artists such as Louis Fancher, many of whom contributed to the pulp magazines which were produced in the offices below.

==== Early tenants ====
Besides the Fuller Company, the Flatiron's other original tenants included publishers such as magazine publishing pioneer Frank Munsey and American Architect and Building News. An insurance company, the Equitable Life Assurance Society, leased nearly the entire third floor. Small businesses also occupied the Flatiron, including a patent medicine company; the Western Specialty Manufacturing Company; and Whitehead & Hoag, which made celluloid novelties. Other tenants included an overflow of music publishers from "Tin Pan Alley" on 28th Street; a landscape architect; the Imperial Russian Consulate, which took up three floors; the New York State Athletic Commission; the Bohemian Guides Society; the Roebling Construction Company, owned by the sons of Tammany Hall boss Richard Croker; and the crime syndicate Murder, Inc. The puppeteer Tony Sarg had a studio in the Flatiron Building during the 1910s. Harry Black moved the Fuller Company's offices in 1911 to the Trinity Building at 111 Broadway, where its parent company, U.S. Realty, had its offices. U.S. Realty moved its offices back to the Flatiron in 1916.

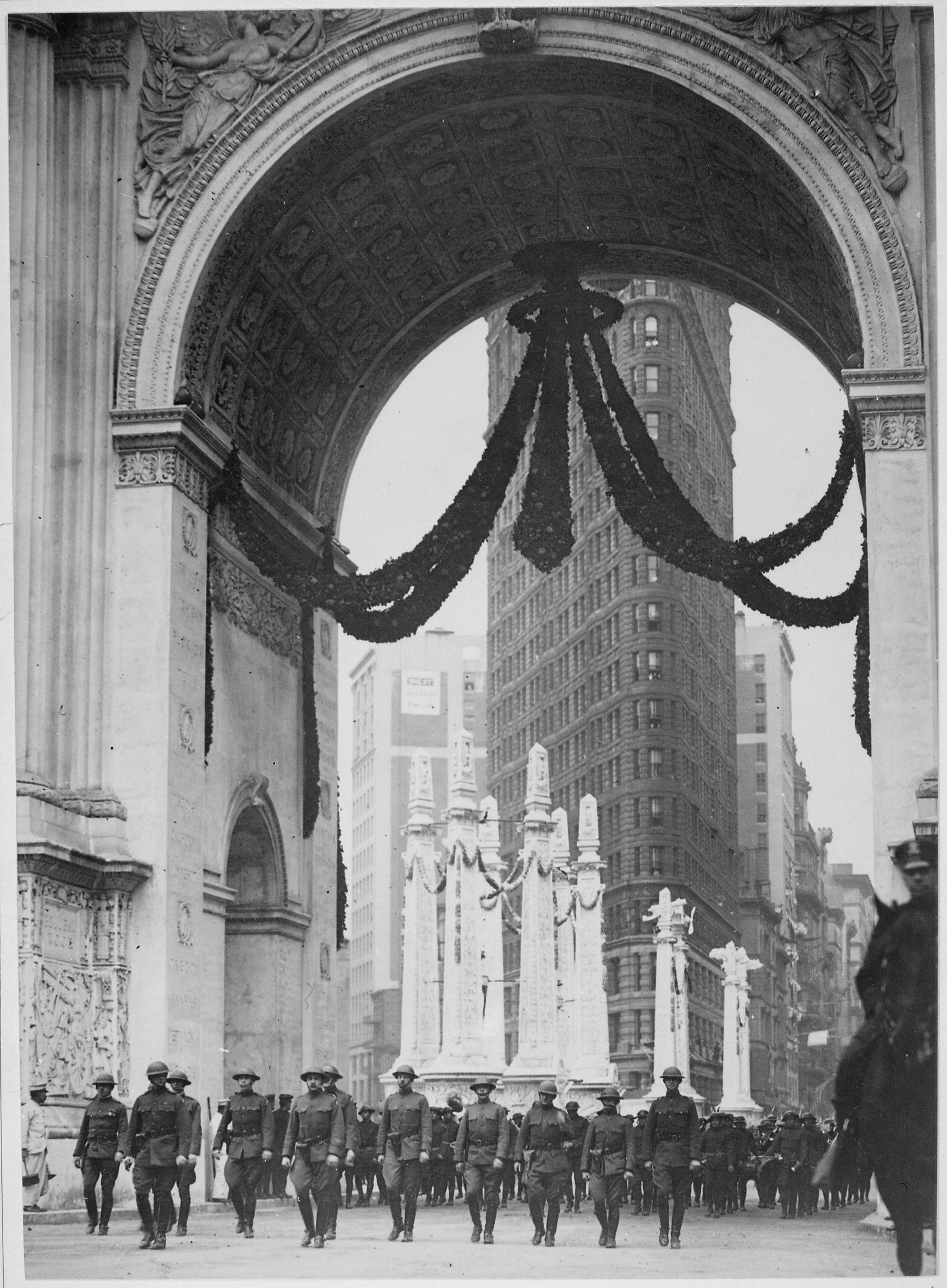
After the end of World War I, the 165th New York Infantry Regiment passes through the Victory Arch in Madison Square, with the Flatiron Building in the background (1919).

The building's vast cellar extended into the vaults that went more than 20 feet (6.1 m) under the surrounding streets. Initial plans called for a ratskeller to be opened within the vaults, but Manhattan borough president Jacob A. Cantor had objected to the plans. Ultimately, part of the basement was occupied by the Flatiron Restaurant, which could seat 1,500 patrons and was open from breakfast through late supper for those taking in a performance at one of the many theatres which lined Broadway between 14th and 23rd Streets. In the building's early years, sightseeing buses would bring visitors to the Flatiron Restaurant and to the 21st-story observation deck. In 1911, the building introduced a restaurant–club in the basement. It was among the first of its kind that allowed a black jazz band to perform, thus introducing ragtime to affluent New Yorkers.

Even before construction began, the area around Madison Square had started to deteriorate somewhat. After U.S. Realty constructed the New York Hippodrome, Madison Square Garden was no longer the venue of choice, and survived largely by staging boxing matches. The base of the Flatiron became a cruising spot for gay men, including some male prostitutes. Nonetheless, in 1911 the Flatiron Restaurant was bought by Louis Bustanoby, of the well-known Café des Beaux-Arts, and converted into a trendy 400-seat French restaurant, Taverne Louis. As an innovation to attract customers from another restaurant opened by his brothers, Bustanoby hired a black musical group, Louis Mitchell and his Southern Symphony Quintette, to play dance tunes at the Taverne and the Café. Irving Berlin heard the group at the Taverne and suggested that they should try to get work in London, which they did. (Note: Mitchell would later become a headliner and nightclub owner in Paris, becoming a millionaire before losing his fortune. He returned to the U.S., where he drove a beer truck in Washington, D.C.) The Taverne also welcomed a gay clientele, which then was unusual for a restaurant of its type. The Taverne was forced to close after Prohibition negatively impacted restaurant business.

When the U.S. entered World War I, the Federal government instituted a "Wake Up America!" campaign, and the United Cigar store in the Flatiron's cowcatcher donated its space to the U.S. Navy for use as a recruiting center. Liberty Bonds were sold outside on sidewalk stands.

=== Rosenbaum and Equitable ownership ===
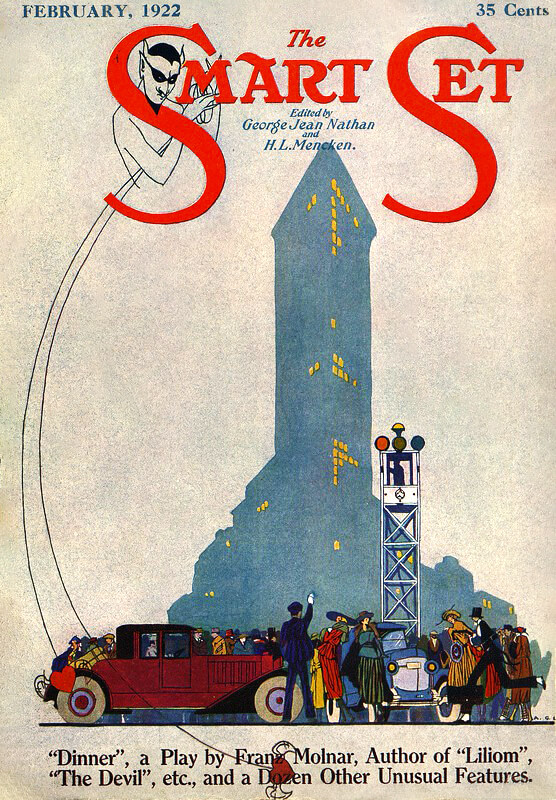
The Flatiron Building on a magazine cover in 1922

In March 1925, Black agreed to sell the Flatiron Building to a syndicate led by Lewis Rosenbaum, which also owned numerous other notable buildings around the U.S. Although the sale price was not revealed, the building was valued at $2 million, (Note: Equivalent to $29.21 million in 2025) about the same amount Black had paid to buy the lot and erect the Flatiron. The syndicate paid $500,000 (Note: Equivalent to $7.3 million in 2025) in cash and covered the remainder of the purchase price with a long-term mortgage; the transaction provided cash for the financially struggling U.S. Realty Company. Many pottery, glassware, and china firms leased space for display firms within the Flatiron Building through the late 1920s. Additionally, drug-store chain Walgreens opened a store within the "cowcatcher" space in 1927, replacing the United Cigar store. By then, many businesses were moving farther northward, including the Fuller Company, which left permanently for the Fuller Building on Madison Avenue in 1929. The Flatiron's operating costs were increasing, and its income decreased greatly with the onset of the Great Depression in 1929. The Flatiron had long since been surpassed in height by other structures, and its roof was "of interest chiefly for its historic associations".

The Equitable Life Assurance Society sued to foreclose upon the building's mortgage in March 1933 after the owners defaulted on mortgage payments. The mortgage had an unpaid principal of more than $1 million, (Note: Equivalent to $19.7 million in 2025) and the owners had not paid interest in more than a year. The building was placed for sale at a foreclosure auction, and Equitable acquired the building on June 30 for $100,000, (Note: Equivalent to $2.0 million in 2025) submitting the only bid at the auction. To attract tenants, Equitable upgraded some parts of the building in 1941. The original cast-iron birdcage elevators, which consisted of rubber-tiled cabs built by Hecla Iron Works, were replaced with enclosed cabs; however, the hydraulic power system remained in place. In addition, the lobby's open grillwork partitions were replaced with marble partitions. The building's heat, light, and elevators were maintained by a team of eight engineers, who sometimes went on strike. By the mid-1940s, the building was fully rented. Clothing and toy companies took up much of the space; other tenants included a paper company, an advertiser, and Baseball Magazine.

=== Helmsley-Spear management ===
Equitable sold the building in October 1945 to an investment syndicate led by lawyer Max Silverstein; at the time, the structure was valued at $1.05 million. (Note: Equivalent to $14.9 million in 2025) Harry Helmsley's firm Dwight-Helmsley (later Helmsley-Spear) brokered the sale and continued to manage the property. By 1946, the partnership of Flatiron Associates owned the building, and Dwight-Helmsley owned a minority stake in the partnership. The new owners made some superficial changes in the early 1950s, such as adding a dropped ceiling to the lobby, and replacing the original mahogany-paneled entrances midway along the sides (not the doors at the corners) with modern revolving doors made of steel and glass. After architect George C. Rudolph remodeled the main entrance, the 23rd Street Association gave Dwight-Helmsley an award in 1953, recognizing the firm's "contribution to the development of the Twenty-third Street area". By then, the surrounding area had become largely industrial, with many companies in the publishing, clothing, toy, and manufacturing industries.

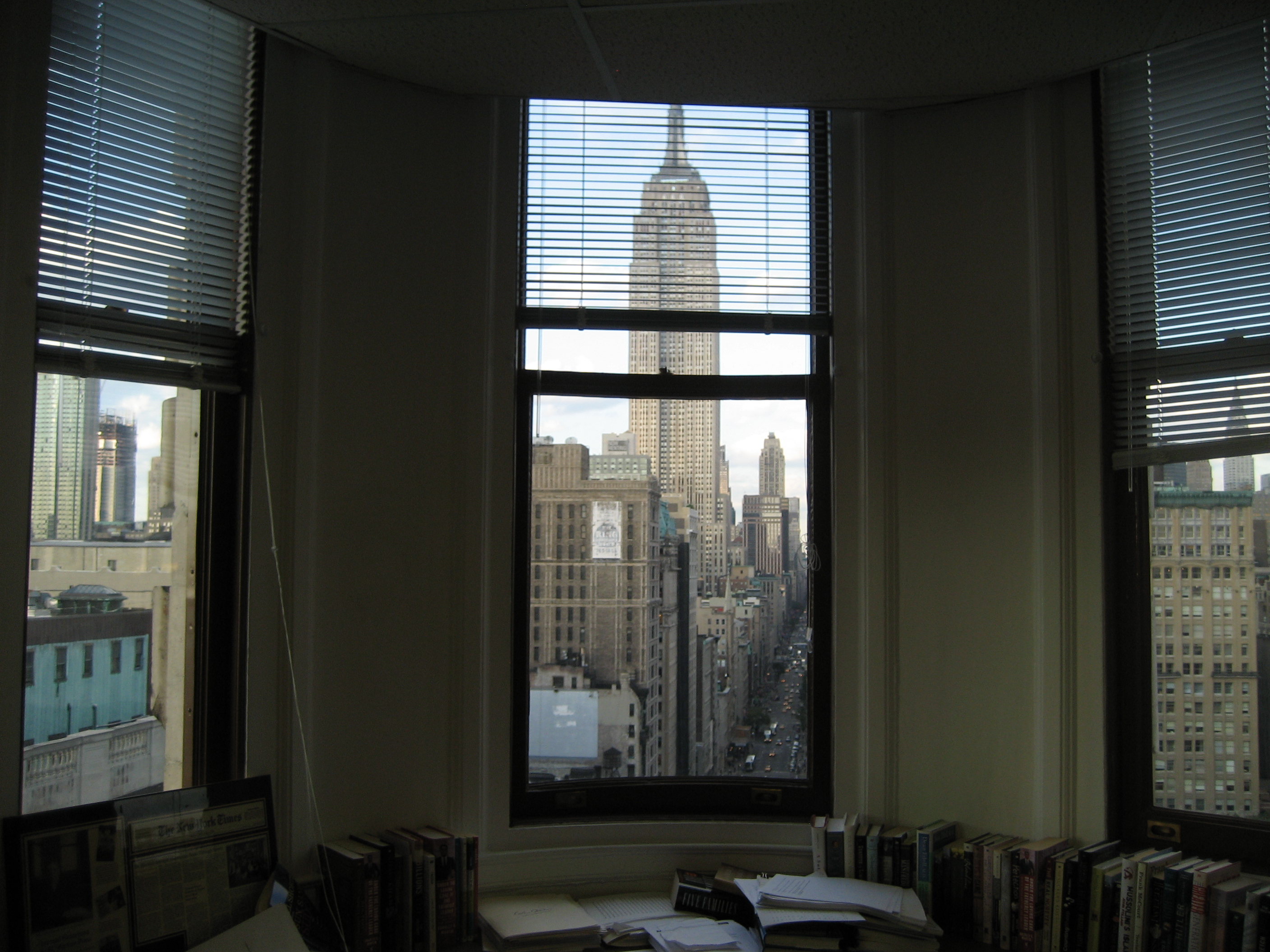
A view from the inside of a "point" office

In 1959, St. Martin's Press moved into the building, and gradually its parent company, Macmillan, rented other offices as they became available. During its tenancy, Macmillan renovated some of the Flatiron Building's floors for its imprints such as Tor/Forge, Picador and Henry Holt and Company. St. Martin's Press president Thomas McCormack had an office within the building's prow. According to McCormack, the company's authors were "fascinated" by the building; he said it was "the only office I know of where you can stand in one place and see the East River, the Hudson and Central Park without moving". Macmillan wrote about the building:

The Flatiron's interior is known for having its strangely-shaped offices with walls that cut through at an angle on their way to the skyscraper's famous point. These "point" offices are the most coveted and feature amazing northern views that look directly upon another famous Manhattan landmark, the Empire State Building.

The Helmsley/Flatiron Associates ownership structure was a tenancy-in-common, in which all co-owners had to agree on any action, as opposed to a straightforward partnership, in which only a majority of co-owners needed to agree. Hence, it was difficult to get permission for necessary repairs and improvements, and the building declined during the Helmsley/Flatiron Associates era. The surrounding neighborhood declined for several decades, and many of the area's longtime commercial tenants had started to move out. An "anonymous-looking importing firm" occupied the "cowcatcher" retail space, for which there was relatively little demand. The 21st floor and several stories below it were slightly damaged during a fire in 1972. By the late 1980s, one broker said that "the elevators are bad and the facade is dirty" at the Flatiron Building; in particular, there was graffiti across the base, while the rest of the facade was covered in soot. Several of Helmsley's other buildings were similarly rundown.

The facade of the Flatiron Building was restored in 1991 by the firm of Hurley & Farinella. As part of the project, the lobby was renovated, and the terracotta details were also repaired. In addition, C.P. Company leased the ground floor and renovated the space into a clothing store, which opened in February 1991. Bentley LaRosa Salasky designed the store's facade, while Cordero Progetti redesigned the interior, exposing the columns at the building's prow. The surrounding neighborhood's reputation had started to improve, and all of the Flatiron Building's space was under lease. Numerous publishing firms relocated to the area in the late 20th century, and, by the early 1990s, the building's two largest tenants were publishing firms. St. Martin's Press renewed its lease for ten stories of the building in 1993, with an option to expand into smaller tenants' space when their leases expired. Simultaneously, Springer–Verlag renewed its lease for six stories and secured an option for four additional stories. The C.P. Company store only operated until 1996.

=== Newmark management and split ownership ===
By 1995, some of the partners at Flatiron Associates wanted to hire real-estate firm Newmark & Company to replace Helmsley-Spear as the property's managing agent. The dissenting co-owners claimed that Helmsley-Spear was overpaying for elevator maintenance and cleaning. However, the Helmsley family owned a stake in the building, and, because of the tenancy-in-common ownership structure, could block the other owners' attempts to hire Newmark. In 1997, some of the investors sold their 52 percent stake in the building to Newmark, which replaced Helmsley-Spear as the building's managing agent. Shortly after Helmsley's death in January 1997, Helmsley's widow, Leona Helmsley, also sold her ownership stake in the building. Newmark made significant improvements to the property, including installing new electric elevators, replacing the antiquated cabs, which were the last hydraulic elevators in New York City.

==== Macmillan expansion and conversion proposals ====
The Flatiron Building was popular among service companies in the early 2000s, causing rental rates at surrounding buildings to increase. The rent increases occurred amid the gentrification of the surrounding area. By then, St. Martin's Press and Springer–Verlag collectively occupied 90 percent of the space; some of the remaining small tenants had moved away because rents at the Flatiron were too expensive. Macmillan's parent company Holtzbrinck Publishing Group leased additional space in the building in 2004, expanding its presence from 12 to 18 floors. In addition, Holtzbrinck bought an option to lease the two remaining office stories. The building's owners had contemplated converting the building into apartments, but, after Holtzbrinck leased most of the space, the owners instead decided to restore the building's historical details. A 15-story vertical advertising banner covered the facade of the building in 2005, during the renovation, but it was removed after protests from many New York City residents.

Italian real estate investment firm The Sorgente Group bought a majority stake in the Flatiron Building in June 2008; it had previously owned less than 20 percent of the building. The following January, Sorgente announced plans to turn it into a luxury hotel. The value of the Flatiron Building, whose zoning allowed a hotel conversion, was estimated to be $190 million. Jeffrey Gural, chairman of Newmark, sold a stake in the building to the Sorgente Group in November 2009 for $51.8 million, although Gural and several partners still owned part of the building. Afterward, Sorgente owned a 52 percent stake in the building, while various real estate families owned the remaining stake. By 2010, Macmillan occupied all of the building's space, except for the ground floor.

The hotel conversion plans were hampered by the fact that Macmillan's existing lease did not expire until 2018. In a 2010 interview, Veronica Mainetti, who led the Sorgente Group's United States division, did not indicate whether Sorgente still planned to convert the building into a hotel. Mainetti subsequently said in 2015 that, when Macmillan's lease expired, "There possibly is going to be an upgrade and the building could make also a good potential hotel conversion, which we're not completely taking off the table." Due to high demand for office space, the building's value increased 30 percent from 2009 to 2013, when it was worth between $250 million and $300 million. In July 2017, Macmillan announced it was consolidating its New York offices to the Equitable Building at 120 Broadway. Knotel, an operator of coworking spaces, subsequently announced in January 2019 that it wanted to lease all of the building's office space. The Knotel agreement was never finalized.

==== 2010s and 2020s renovation ====
By June 2019, Macmillan had left the building, and all 21 office floors were vacant. GFP Real Estate announced that it would upgrade the building's interior, since the structure would be almost completely vacant, except for a T-Mobile store at the base. GFP planned to install a central air and heating system, strip away all interior partitions, put in a new sprinkler system and a second staircase, upgrade the elevators, and renovate the lobby for $60–80 million. The project was estimated to take a year. The owners were interested in renting the entire building to a single tenant, hiring a high-profile real estate agency to find a suitable tenant. The executive director of the ownership company said: "The building was born as a commercial property, and we want to keep it as such." The building was empty by November 2020, and the full renovation was expected to last for at least two more years.

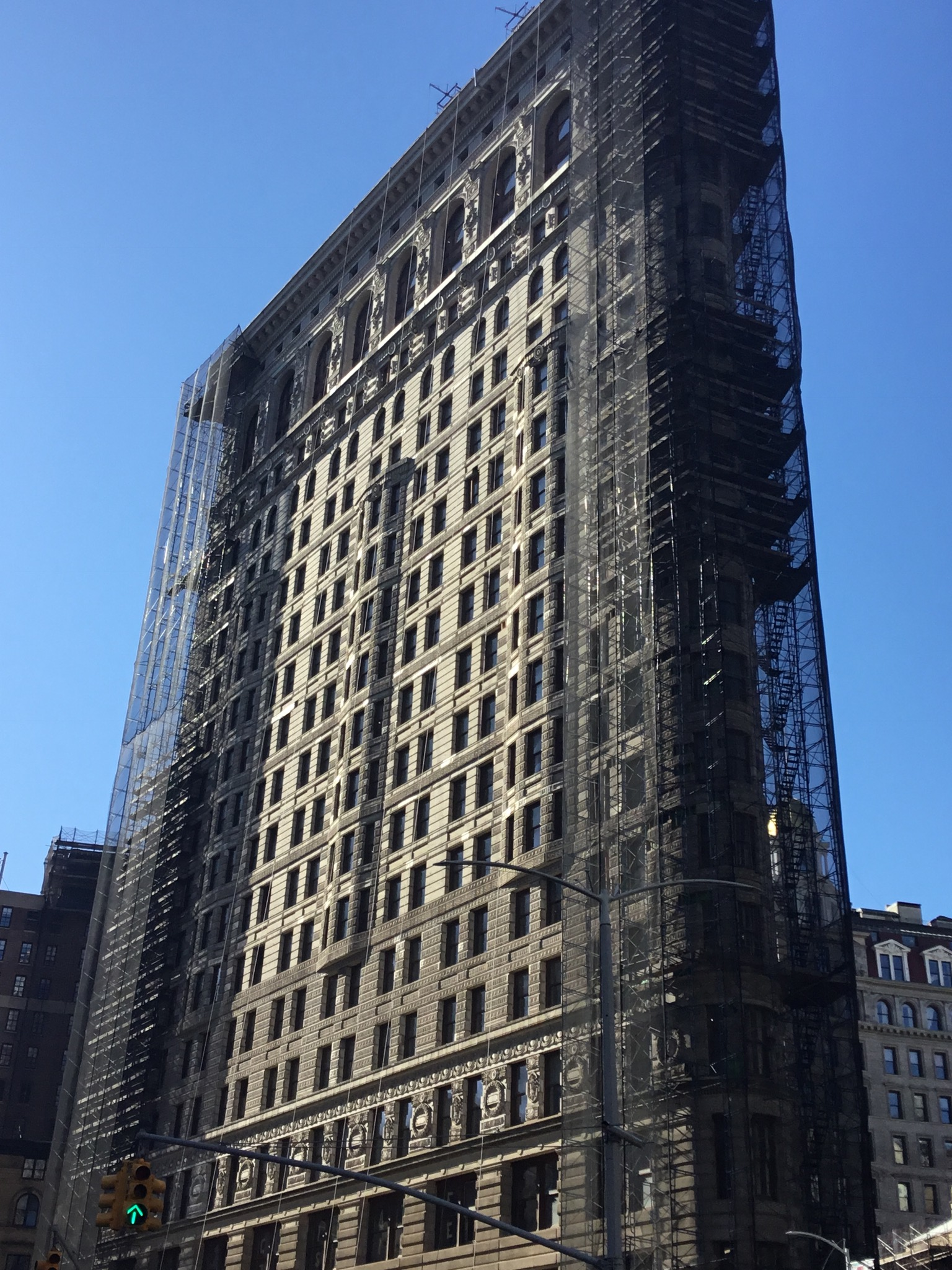
The Flatiron Building under renovation, seen here in February 2023

The full renovation was delayed until 2022 due to the COVID-19 pandemic in New York City. By 2021, four of the building's five co-owners wished to sell off their combined ownership stakes due to disputes over the renovation. A New York state judge ruled in June 2022 that the four co-owners could buy out the stake of the fifth co-owner, Nathan Royce Silverstein, who owned a 25 percent stake in the building and was in disagreement with the other co-owners. According to Jeffrey Gural, Silverstein had first wanted to find a new tenant without renovating the building. Silverstein then suggested dividing the Flatiron Building into five physically separate properties, which according to Gural was infeasible for several reasons, including the fact that it was landmarked. Silverstein, by contrast, claimed that the building's renovation costs were being inflated.

=== Sale and residential conversion ===
==== First auction ====
In March 2023, a New York Supreme Court judge ordered that the Flatiron Building be auctioned after the co-owners could not settle their differences regarding the building's renovation. An opening bid of $40,000 was announced, and no other restrictions were placed on bidders at the auction, which took place on March 22, 2023. GFP Real Estate, Newmark, and ABS Real Estate, which collectively owned 75% of the building, reportedly wished to hold onto it. The building was ultimately sold for $190 million to 31-year-old Jacob Garlick, who owned a venture-capital firm, Abraham Trust, for which there was no contact information available. Garlick said afterward that owning the Flatiron Building had been a lifelong dream since he was a teenager.

For the sale to be finalized, Garlick had to make a 10 percent down payment of $19 million by the close of day on March 24, but he failed to do so. Jeffrey Gural, who came in second in the bidding, said that immediately after the auction on the steps of the New York County Courthouse, Garlick asked him if he wanted to partner in the building, later offering a 10% stake in return for putting up the $19 million down payment. After Garlick missed the deadline for the down payment, the building was offered to Gural at $189.5 million, $500,000 less than Garlick's bid; three existing owners declined their option to buy the building for that amount. A bankruptcy expert noted that bidders at the auction were not required to provide a deposit before bidding, which they said was "highly unorthodox" at such events. Because the runner-up passed on the option to buy the building, a new auction was required, though Garlick was still responsible for the missed $19 million down payment.

Real-estate publications noted that Garlick was a "distant relative" of current co-owner Nathan Silverstein and that his bid may have been intended to increase the purchase price so that Silverstein would receive a larger payout, though The Real Deal found no evidence of collusion. Garlick still maintained that he wanted to buy the building, and both the auctioneer and the court-appointed referee denied any awareness of Garlick's intent; the referee said that Garlick had defaulted and could no longer purchase the building. On May 5, the majority owners, led by Gural, sued Garlick and Abraham Trust, claiming that his bid was fraudulent. Also in May 2023, city officials considered using the building as shelter space amid the New York City migrant housing crisis, but Gural rejected the request.

==== Second auction and renovation ====
Seen at night in 2026

A second auction was scheduled for May 23, 2023, after Gural and his partners declined to exercise their option; prospective bidders reportedly needed a check for $100,000 to participate. In the second auction on May 23, the majority ownership group, composed of Gural, Newmark, Sorgente Group, and ABS Partners, purchased full control of the building with a winning bid of $161 million. Garlick did not submit a bid. Gural and his partners announced plans to convert all or part of the building to residences; they needed a permit from the city to proceed with the conversion. Daniel Brodsky's Brodsky Organization bought a controlling stake in the building in October 2023 and announced that, in partnership with GFP and Sorgente, he would convert the structure to residential condominiums.

In August 2024, the building's developers filed plans to convert the stories above the ground floor into 38 condos, to be completed in 2026. The next month, Brodsky applied for a zoning variance from the city government, which would allow the entire building to be converted to residences; the existing zoning allowed no more than half of the building to be used for residential purposes. That October, Brodsky and his partners received a $357 million loan for the building's renovation from Tyko Capital. Studio Sofield was hired to design the interiors. In August 2025, the New York City Landmarks Preservation Commission (LPC) approved plans to illuminate the building's facade at night, making it the first time the building had permanent nighttime lighting. The next month, the New York Attorney General's office approved a condominium offering plan for the building, which called for apartments costing $10.95 million and $50 million each. The scaffolding was removed from the exterior in early 2026. That year, Jody Williams and Rita Sodi were hired to operate a restaurant in the building, Bar Pisellino Flatiron. By August 2026, fourteen of the thirty-six apartments had been sold.

== Architecture ==
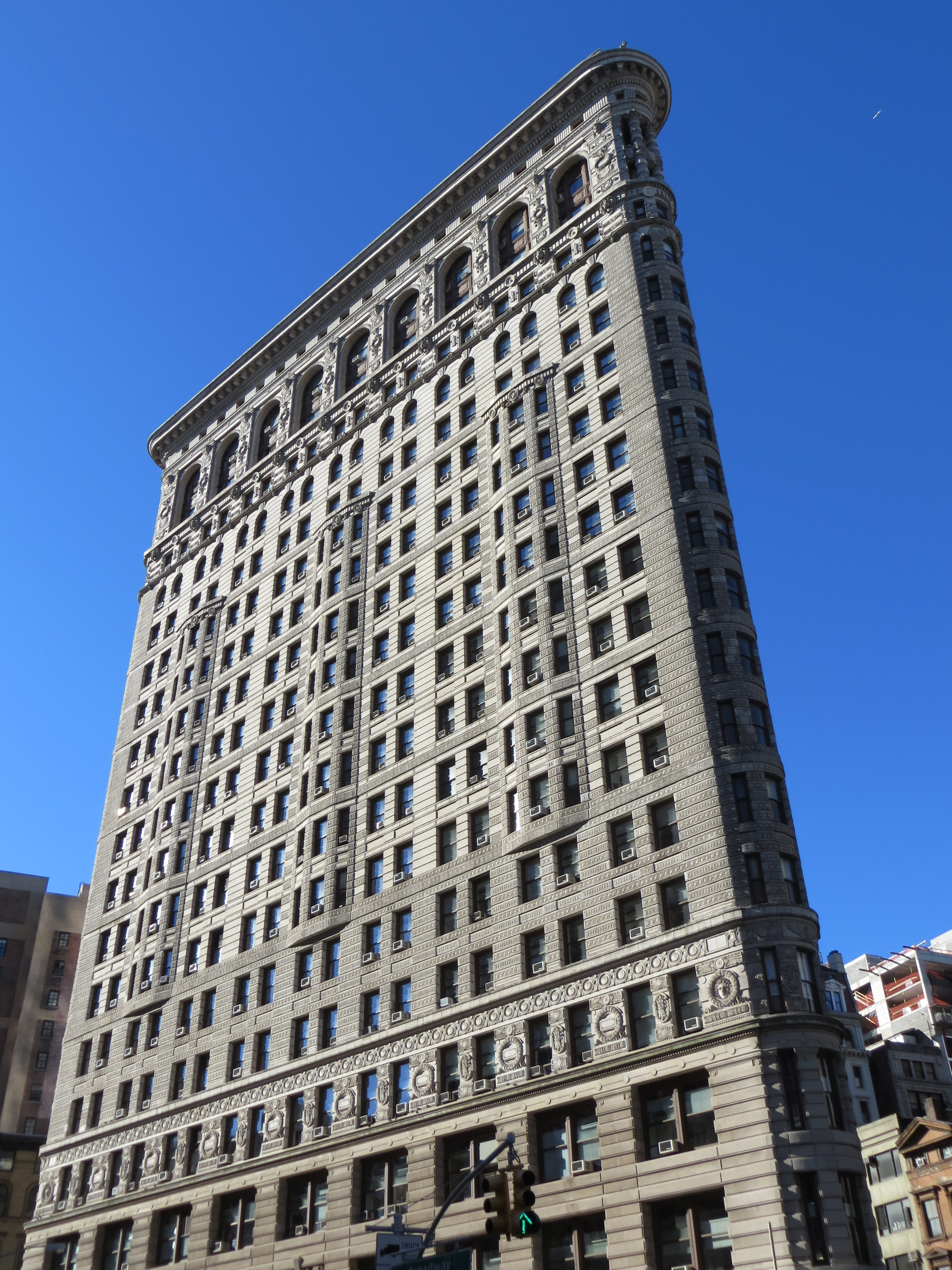
The Flatiron Building as seen from Broadway and 23rd Street

The Flatiron Building was designed by Chicago architect Daniel Burnham as a vertical Renaissance palazzo with Beaux-Arts styling. Unlike early New York skyscrapers such as the contemporary Singer Building (completed in 1908), (Note: The contrast is noted by Zukowsky & Saliga 1984, p. 70ff) which took the form of towers arising from a lower, blockier mass, the Flatiron Building was designed in the style of the Chicago school. The palazzo-style design was intended to reassure passersby by giving an appearance of strength. Filling its entire land lot, the building was constructed as a slab without any setbacks. Originally, the structure was 285 or 286 feet (86.9 or 87.2 m) tall, with 20 stories and an attic. After an expansion in 1905, the building stood 307 feet (94 m) tall, with 22 stories; if the attic is excluded, the expanded building only contains 21 stories. Some sources mistakenly (Note: According to the fifth edition of the AIA Guide to New York City, the belief that the Flatiron Building was one of the first building or skyscraper in New York with a steel skeleton is untrue. Taller steel-framed skyscrapers existed at the time of the Flatiron Building's completion, such as the 391-foot-tall (119 m) Park Row Building, completed in 1899. Other buildings, including the New York Tribune Building of 1874, have also been described as the city's first skyscraper.) describe the building as one of the world's first skyscrapers or steel-framed buildings.

Though Burnham maintained overall control of the design process, he was not directly connected with the details of the structure as built. That task was performed by his designer Frederick P. Dinkelberg, a Pennsylvania-born architect in Burnham's office. The men had worked together since the 1893 World's Columbian Exposition in Chicago. It is unknown where the working drawings for the Flatiron Building are stored, though renderings were published at the time of construction in The American Architect and Architectural Record.

=== Facade ===
Similar to the parts of a classical Greek column, the Flatiron Building's facade is divided into a base, shaft, and capital. The Fifth Avenue and Broadway elevations of the facade are both eighteen bays wide, while the 22nd Street elevation is eight bays wide; the bays are arranged in pairs. The southwest and southeast corners are curved, with one rounded window on each story above the base. In addition, each story of the curved prow on 23rd Street contains three sash windows; the central window is wider than the other two. Many of the Flatiron Building's tenants referred to the prow as "the Point".

The facade of the three-story base (Note: The National Park Service describes the base as being five stories high. This is in part because the NPS describes the ground level as a double-height story. In addition, the transitional fourth story (which the NPS characterizes as the fifth story) is included in the characterization of the base. Another conflicting figure is given by Alexiou 2010, p. 74, which cites the base as rising four stories.) is made of limestone. Each of the openings at the base is two bays wide. There are entrances on either end of the 22nd Street elevation, as well as at the centers of the Fifth Avenue and Broadway elevations. Above the base, the facade is made of glazed terracotta from the Atlantic Terra Cotta Company in Tottenville, Staten Island. The building also contains decorative details such as cornices, moldings, and oriel windows. These materials were intended to give the impression of "general unity in treatment", while also giving the facade a textured appearance. Early sketches by Daniel Burnham show an unexecuted clock face and a far more elaborate crown than was ultimately built.

==== Base ====
At ground level, the entrances on Fifth Avenue and Broadway are each flanked by four storefront windows to the north and south. The storefront windows are separated from each other by vertical piers with horizontal bands of smooth-faced and vermiculated limestone. The entrances on Fifth Avenue and Broadway are flanked by a pair of engaged columns, which are vertically fluted and are overlaid by smooth and vermiculated bands of limestone. The columns support an entablature decorated with alternating roundels and triglyphs; immediately above the entablature, on the second story, are oculus windows with console brackets on either side. The entablatures above both entrances are connected by a projecting cornice that wraps around the ground floor. On the second and third stories, each opening generally contains two sash windows. A frieze with dentils runs above the third story.

There were two wooden revolving doors at the southwestern and southeastern corners of the building, at 22nd Street's intersections with Fifth Avenue and Broadway, respectively. These were installed in 1910 by the company that held the original 1888 U.S. patent for the technology. At the time, these doors were a symbol of the structure's modernity and engineering sophistication. The southeastern entrance no longer exists, but during the 2020s condominium conversion, the southwestern revolving door was designated as the main residential entrance. As part of an effort to restore the ground floor, the original wooden enclosure—which showed decades of wear and graffiti—underwent a complete craftsman restoration to return it to its early 20th-century condition. The restoration was praised for its intricate wood carvings and authenticity.

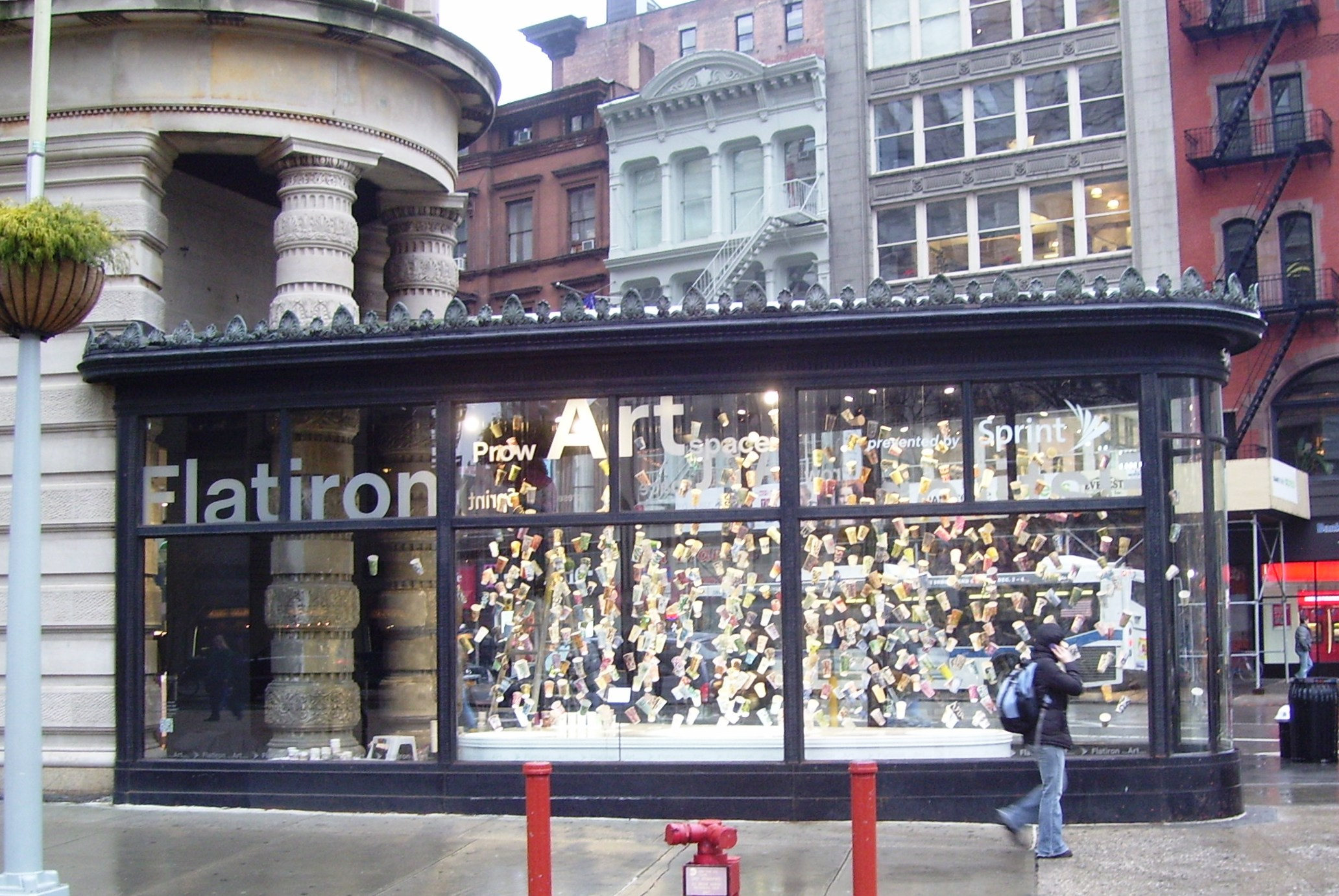
The "cowcatcher" retail space in front of the prow

The prow of the building, facing 23rd Street, includes a pair of two-story-high Classical columns. These were echoed at the top of the building by two columns that supported the cornice. The single-story "cowcatcher" retail space in front of the prow, added to the plans in 1902, was not part of Burnham or Dinkelberg's design. The "cowcatcher" structure measured 25 feet (7.6 m) long and 13 feet (4.0 m) tall, with a metal roof. Burnham initially did not want to add the "cowcatcher" space, since he believed it would ruin the symmetry of the prow's design, but he was forced to accept the addition on Black's insistence.

==== Upper stories ====
The 4th story is designed as a transitional story, with eight sash windows on 22nd Street, as well as 18 sash windows each on Broadway and Fifth Avenue. The windows are flanked by alternating wide and narrow piers, each of which contains terracotta panels with decorations such as foliate motifs, masks, lozenges, and wreaths. Above the 4th story is a frieze with roundels, as well as a cornice.

The 12-story midsection spans the 5th through 16th stories. The 5th and 6th stories each contain sash windows similar to those on the 4th story, but the terracotta piers between each bay are decorated in a simpler design. A frieze with a meander pattern wraps around the building above the 6th story. The Broadway and Fifth Avenue facades both contain three projecting trapezoidal oriels (Note: On either facade, the central oriel replaces the center pair of bays, while the other two oriels replace the second-outermost pair of bays.) on the 7th through 14th stories; each oriel contains three windows per story. At the time of the Flatiron Building's construction, relatively few skyscrapers in New York City used oriels, but they were commonly used in Chicago to break up winds. The 15th story contains sash windows separated by rusticated brick piers. The 16th story contains arched windows; the voussoirs above these windows support a cornice that runs above that story. The 17th story is also designed as a transitional story, with alternating wide and narrow piers decorated with roundels and lions' heads. Another projecting cornice runs above the 17th story.

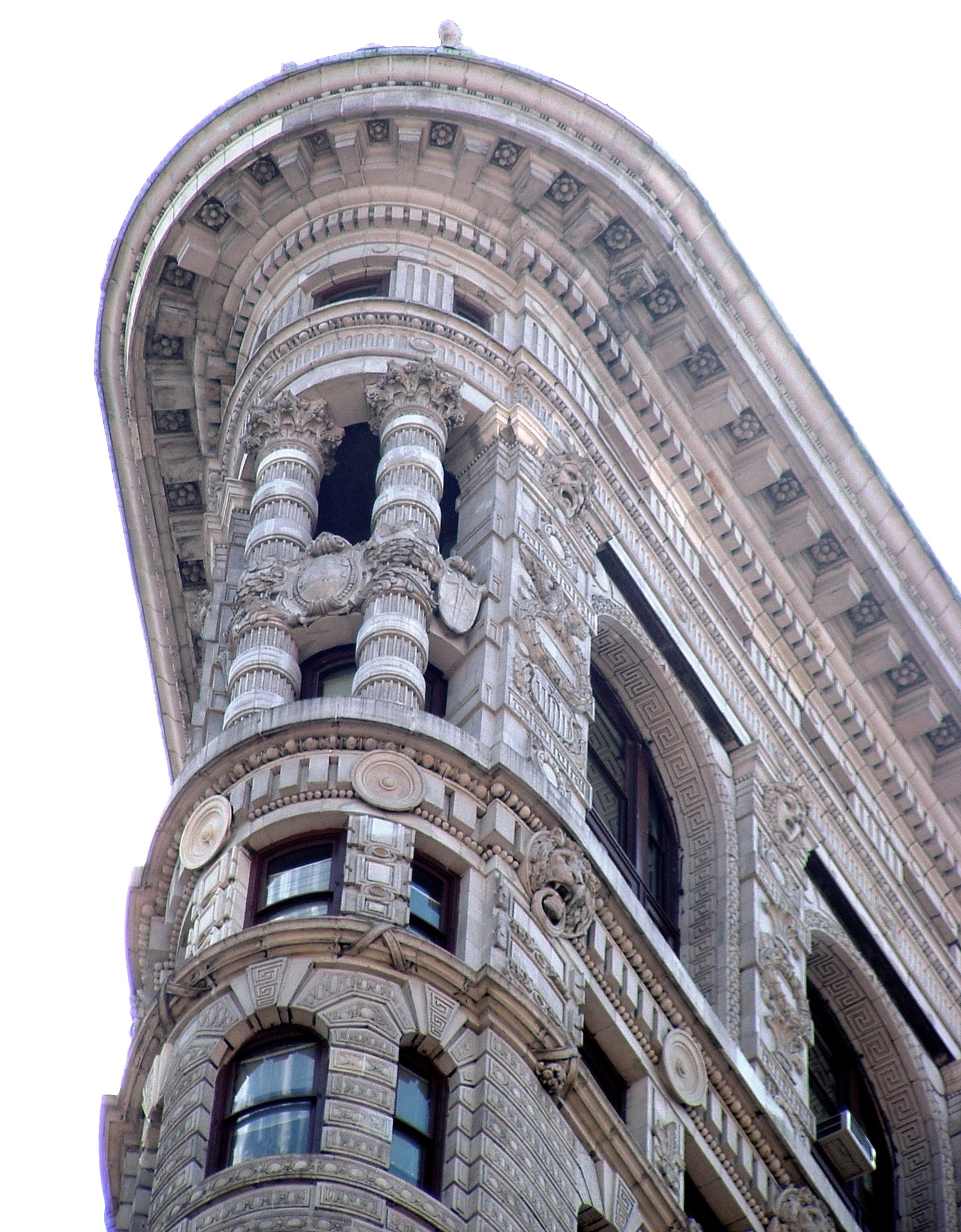
Close-up of the apex. There were formerly terraces at the 18th and 19th stories, between the columns.

The capital consists of the top four stories. The 18th and 19th stories contain an arcade of double-height, double-width arches. Each archway contains a metal frame with multiple glass panes. There are metal spandrel panels between the windows on the 18th and 19th stories. The arches themselves are separated vertically by ornate terracotta piers, topped by capitals with masks and wreaths. At the building's northern corner, the 18th and 19th stories originally had outdoor terraces, which were enclosed at some point during the 20th century. The 20th story contains small square windows, above which is a deep cornice with dentils and brackets; the cornice projects about 5.5 feet (1.7 m) beyond the building's perimeter. There are decorative triglyphs between the 20th-story windows.

The 20th story was originally topped by an attic for mechanical equipment; the 21st-story penthouse was added in a subsequent renovation. The attic still exists and is placed between the 20th and 21st stories. Initially, the penthouse was not surrounded by a railing; a balustrade was subsequently added above the 20th story. At the building's apex were originally two terracotta sculptures of cherubs. The cherubs symbolized the building's "guardian spirits" and held scrolls that surrounded a tablet with George A. Fuller's name. The statues were removed to an unknown location in the late 1980s, and a set of replacement cherubs were installed in 2001 after preservationists filed a complaint with the LPC.

=== Structural features ===
Purdy and Henderson were the structural engineers, and Hamilton J. Chapman was the chief consulting engineer for the project. The construction of the Flatiron was made feasible by a change to New York City's building codes in 1892, which eliminated the requirement that masonry be used for fireproofing considerations. This opened the way for steel-skeleton construction. The steel-frame technique was familiar to the Fuller Company, a contracting firm with considerable expertise in building such tall structures. Using a steel frame made the Flatiron Building's construction relatively easy; it would have been difficult to construct a 22-story building using other construction methods of that time. The steel bracing, designed by engineer Corydon Purdy of Purdy and Henderson, allowed the Flatiron Building to withstand four times the amount of wind force it could ever be expected to endure. Theoretically, the frame's strength would allow it to tip over in strong wind, rather than failing in place.

The building's frame contains 3,680 short tons (3,290 long tons; 3,340 t) of steel. According to architectural writers Sarah Bradford Landau and Carl W. Condit, as well as the New-York Tribune and author Joseph J. Korom, each of the stories above ground level measures 190 feet (58 m) on Broadway, 173 feet (53 m) on Fifth Avenue, and 87 feet (27 m) on 22nd Street. Engineering Record magazine gives a slightly different measurement of 171 feet (52 m) on Fifth Avenue and 86 feet (26 m) on 22nd Street. (Note: Since the site is a right triangle, this would give the Broadway frontage a measurement of approximately 191 feet (58 m).) At the vertex, the triangular tower is only 6 feet (1.8 m) or 6.5 feet (2 m) wide. The Broadway and Fifth Avenue elevations meet at an angle of about 25 degrees.

==== Foundation ====
The foundation of the building extends 35 feet (11 m) deep and was excavated to the underlying layer of bedrock. It is surrounded by trapezoidal, waterproof retaining walls, which measure between 2 and 6 feet (0.61 and 1.83 m) thick. The underlying bedrock ranges from 30 to 37 feet (9.1 to 11.3 m) below ground, very close to the bottom of the building's foundation. The foundation itself consists of concrete footings with granite caps, above which rise the building's steel columns. The cast-iron bases measure 4 to 6 feet (1.2 to 1.8 m) square and are placed on slightly wider granite capstones, which measure 2 feet (0.61 m) thick. The concrete footings, placed directly on the bedrock, also have a square cross-section, measuring 8 to 9.5 feet (2.4 to 2.9 m) on each side.

The basement extends beyond the building's lot line, occupying vaults underneath the sidewalk and roadways. The vaults have a total area of 8,595 square feet (798.5 m^{2}). Measured from the centers of the columns at the site's perimeter, the vaults extend about 26 feet (7.9 m) to the west, 22 feet (6.7 m) to the east, and 50 feet (15 m) to the north. These spaces are surrounded by the retaining walls. The ceiling of the vaults is supported by 18 steel columns outside the building's lot line. The steel columns are recessed behind the retaining wall and are connected to the retaining wall by horizontal girders, which support the sidewalks above.

==== Superstructure ====
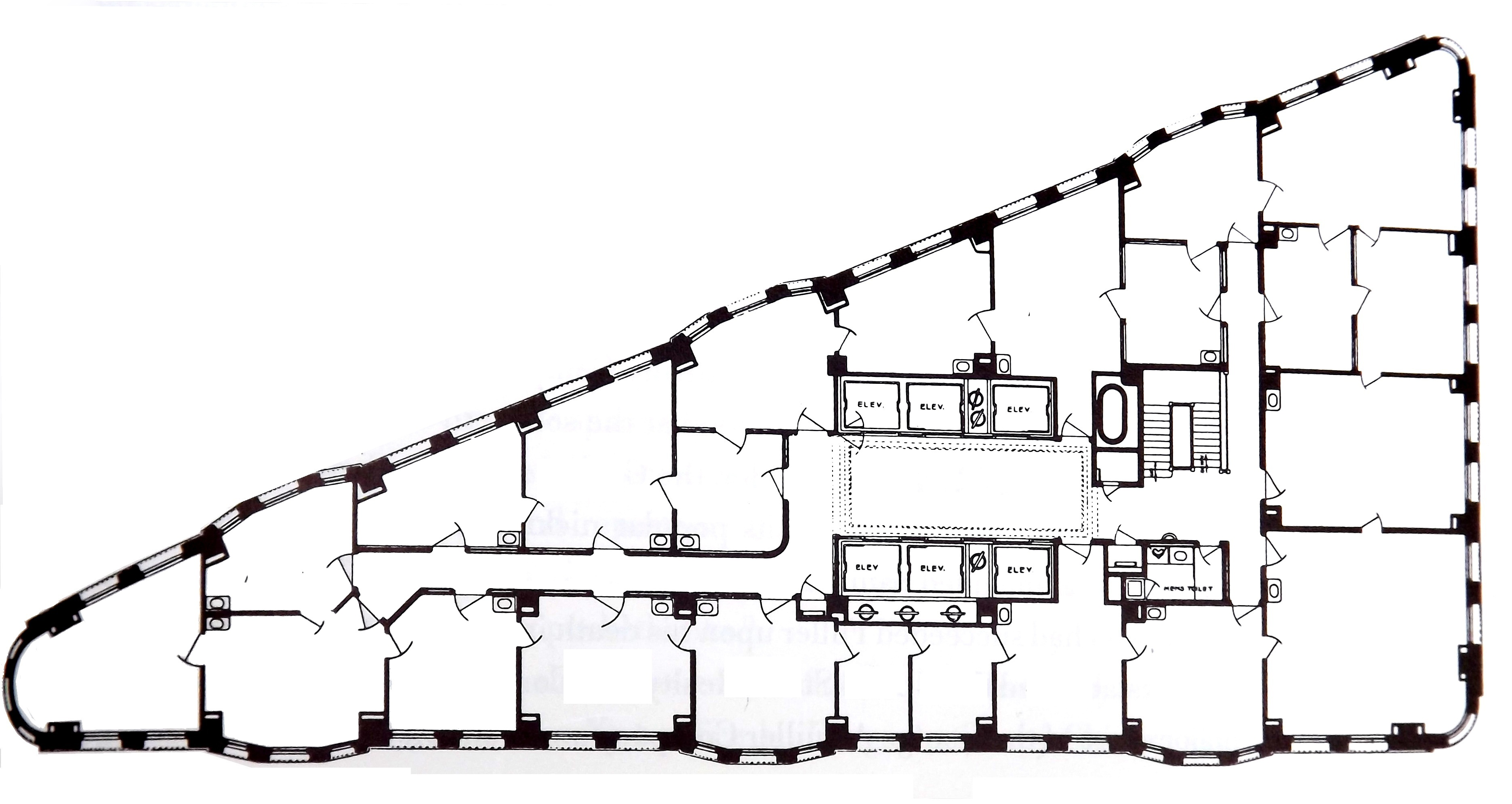
A typical floor of the Flatiron Building in 1903

The superstructure is primarily supported by 36 built-up steel columns. Each column is an I-beam measuring 14 by 14 inches (360 by 360 mm) across and 1 inch (25 mm) thick; they have a maximum working stress of 12,500 pounds per square inch (86,000 kPa). Twenty-five of these columns are placed on the building's perimeter: five on 22nd Street and ten each on Fifth Avenue and Broadway. The perimeter columns are spaced 17 ft (5.2 m) apart on Fifth Avenue, 18.5 ft (5.6 m) apart on Broadway, and 16 ft (4.9 m) apart on 22nd Street. Five of the interior columns are recessed 14 ft (4.3 m) from the Fifth Avenue facade, and there are several interior columns at the south end of the building. At each story, the columns are connected horizontally by a grid of steel girders and floor beams, which mostly run parallel to the Manhattan street grid. The spaces between the horizontal girders are spanned by flat arches made of terracotta. All of the floor beams could carry a live load of 75 pounds per square foot (3.6 kPa). Each column is connected to the horizontal beams by triangular gusset plates, placed both above and below the beams.

From the 1st to the 12th stories, the outer walls are carried on plate girders; the walls of the remaining stories are carried on girders constructed of back-to-back channels. There is also a masonry pier adjacent to each of the columns on the building's perimeter. The framework at the first story is similar to that at the basement, except at the corners and above each entrance. At ground level, the building's northern prow is cantilevered from a pair of elliptical girders, while the southwest and southeast corners contain diagonal floor beams. On the upper stories, the corners contain curved wall girders and diagonal floor beams of varying dimensions. In addition, the oriel windows and some of the facade's decorative details are cantilevered from the outer walls. On the 18th through 20th stories, the columns are recessed from the outer wall.

Purdy and Henderson designed two systems of wind bracing for the building. One system consists of diagonal steel bars shaped like a rotated "K", which extend downward from the centers of the horizontal girders. The other system of bracing is similar, but the diagonal steel bars extend both upward and downward from the horizontal girders. A supplemental system of transverse bracing is also used between the foundation and the second floor. The flat roof was built similarly to the floor slabs and could carry a live load of 50 pounds per square foot (2.4 kPa).

=== Mechanical features ===
The building had a power plant that generated high-pressure steam and electricity. In the 1940s, it was one of a few remaining structures in New York City with its own power plant. Bathrooms for males and females are placed on alternating floors, with the men's rooms on even floors and the women's rooms on odd ones. The women's restrooms were not part of the original design.

Until the end of the 20th century, the building retained its original hydraulic elevators, which were powered by water. Otis Elevator manufactured six hydraulic elevators for the building, although Hecla Iron Works constructed the original elevator cabs. The elevators had a reputation for being slow and, when the elevators' hydraulic pipes burst, water would often leak into the elevator cabs. To reach the top floor—the 21st, which was added in 1905, three years after the building was completed—occupants had to take a second elevator from the 20th floor. On the 21st floor, the bottoms of the windows are chest-high. The hydraulic elevators were replaced with electric cabs in the 1980s, and the original staircase was removed in the 2020s and replaced with two staircases.

=== Interior ===
The building had 241,000 square feet (22,400 m^{2}) of usable space. Contemporary critics considered the structure "quirky", with drafty wood-framed and copper-clad windows, no central air conditioning, a heating system with cast-iron radiators, an antiquated sprinkler system, and a single staircase for evacuation. The offices were furnished with mahogany and oak, which the Fuller Company advertised as "fireproof". The triangular shape of the structure led to a "rabbit warren" of oddly-shaped rooms, arranged around a large utility core. The offices on each floor were connected by a central passageway, and each floor contained about 20 office cubicles, all of which were connected by various doors. According to The New York Times, offices in the prow had "impressive" views "because of the converging traffic street markings, which accent the telescoping boulevards, and because of the changing seasons in Madison Square Park".

As of 2026, the offices had been replaced with 36 residential condominiums, along with 38 units of storage space and three commercial storefronts. The original lobby on the ground floor became a cafe. The core was reconfigured into a long, narrow massing, allowing two apartments on each floor. The apartments generally have three to five bedrooms. The five-bedroom penthouse, spanning 4,600 square feet (430 m^{2}), has the most outdoor space, with a terrace wrapping around the roof. The largest condominiums, units 20 and 21, are each more than 7,400 square feet (690 m^{2}). The building is also planned to have six wine cellars. Other amenities, including a fitness room, lounge, storage, and a spa and pool area, were placed in the basement.

== Impact and legacy ==
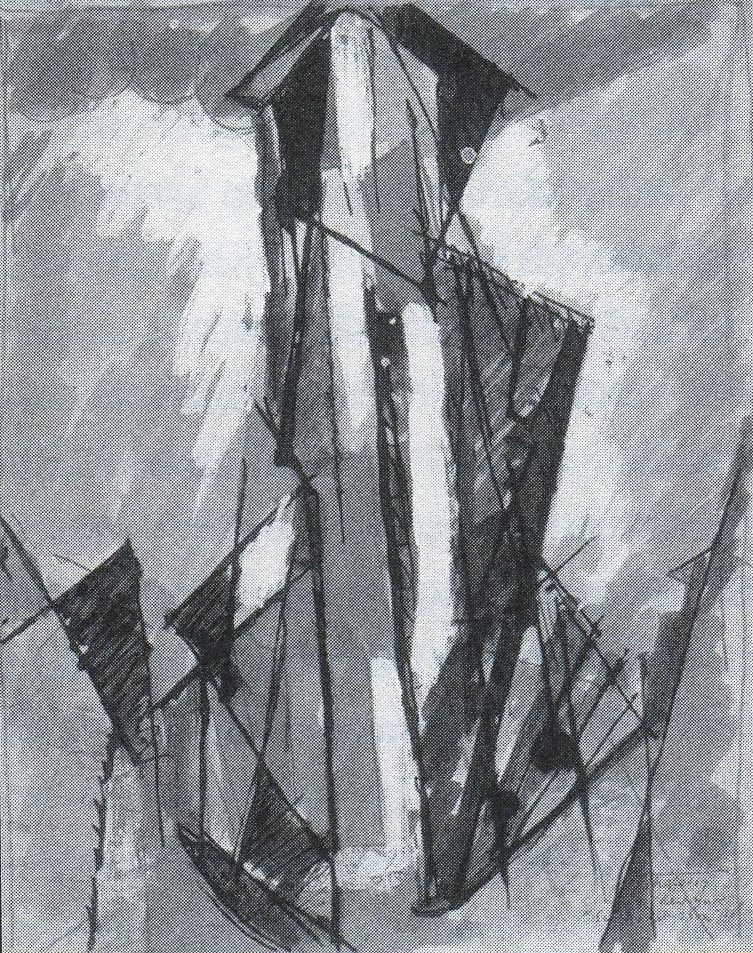
Sur le Flatiron, Albert Gleizes, gouache and ink (1916)

The Flatiron Building became an icon of New York City upon completion, and public response to it was enthusiastic. The structure attracted not only "sidewalk superintendents" – members of the general public who expressed great interest in the project – but also architects and engineers. Crowds of several hundred people looked at the building "for five and ten minutes at a time", often from multiple vantage points, while the Tribune said that crowds would sometimes look at the building "with their heads bent back until a general breakage of necks seems imminent". By the mid-20th century, the building no longer attracted crowds, and most tourists "want[ed] to go up in the Flatiron only to take pictures of other taller buildings". It remained well known, even after taller buildings such as the Chrysler Building and the Empire State Building were constructed. Graphic designer Miriam Berman wrote that the building's popularity endured because "the only famous Manhattan skyscraper that enables tourists to take a picture of the entire building from the ground up".

The Flatiron's stature prompted a trademark dispute in 1999, when Newmark & Company and venture capital firm Flatiron Partners, which was headquartered in a different building, both tried to register an image of the building as a trademark. Flatiron Partners, which had wanted to use the building's image as its logo, ultimately licensed the image from Newmark & Company.

=== Reception ===
==== Architectural commentary and rankings ====
When the building was completed, critical response was not completely positive, and what praise it garnered was often for the cleverness of its engineering. Montgomery Schuyler, editor of Architectural Record, said that its "awkwardness [is] entirely undisguised, and without even an attempt to disguise them, if they have not even been aggravated by the treatment. ... The treatment of the tip is an additional and it seems wanton aggravation of the inherent awkwardness of the situation." He praised the building's surface, and the detailing of its terra-cotta work, but questioned the practicality of its large number of windows: "[The tenant] can, perhaps, find wall space within for one roll top desk without overlapping the windows, with light close in front of him and close behind him and close on one side of him. But suppose he needed a bookcase? Undoubtedly he has a highly eligible place from which to view processions. But for the transaction of business?"

Before the Flatiron Building was completed, Life magazine wrote: "Madison Square is not a bad-looking place as it is, and ought to be one of the beauty spots of the city. It is grievous to think that its fair proportions are to be marred by this outlandish structure." Sculptor William Ordway Partridge remarked in 1904 that it was "a disgrace to our city, an outrage to our sense of the artistic, and a menace to life". The New-York Tribune called the new building "A stingy piece of pie ... the greatest inanimate troublemaker in New York", a sentiment repeated by Architectural Record. The Municipal Art Society said that it was "unfit to be in the Center of the City", and The New York Times called it a "monstrosity". Even later, Christopher Gray of the Times wrote in 1991: "The facade itself is handsome but not exceptional for its time."

Futurist H. G. Wells wrote in his 1906 book The Future in America: A Search After Realities: "I found myself agape, admiring a sky-scraper the prow of the Flat-iron Building, to be particular, ploughing up through the traffic of Broadway and Fifth Avenue in the afternoon light." Architect Robert A. M. Stern wrote in 1983 that the Flatiron was among the city's first buildings to "convincingly express the romantic characteristics of the skyscraper". Architectural historian Thomas Hines wrote in 1979 that the building was "one of Burnham's most elegant skyscrapers", saying that the only drawback was the ornamentation, which Hines found excessive. Karl Zimmermann of The Washington Post wrote in 1987 that the Flatiron was "an idiosyncratic wedge blanketed with French Renaissance ornamentation, still remarkable today in its lightness, grace and novelty."

The American Institute of Architects' 2007 survey List of America's Favorite Architecture ranked the Flatiron Building among the top 150 buildings in the United States. In May 2023, Buildworld conducted a sentiment analysis of design-related tweets about notable buildings in the world and in United States. In the U.S. survey, the Flatiron Building ranked fourth, after Fallingwater, the Empire State Building, and the Coit Tower.

==== Wind gusts and "23 skidoo" ====
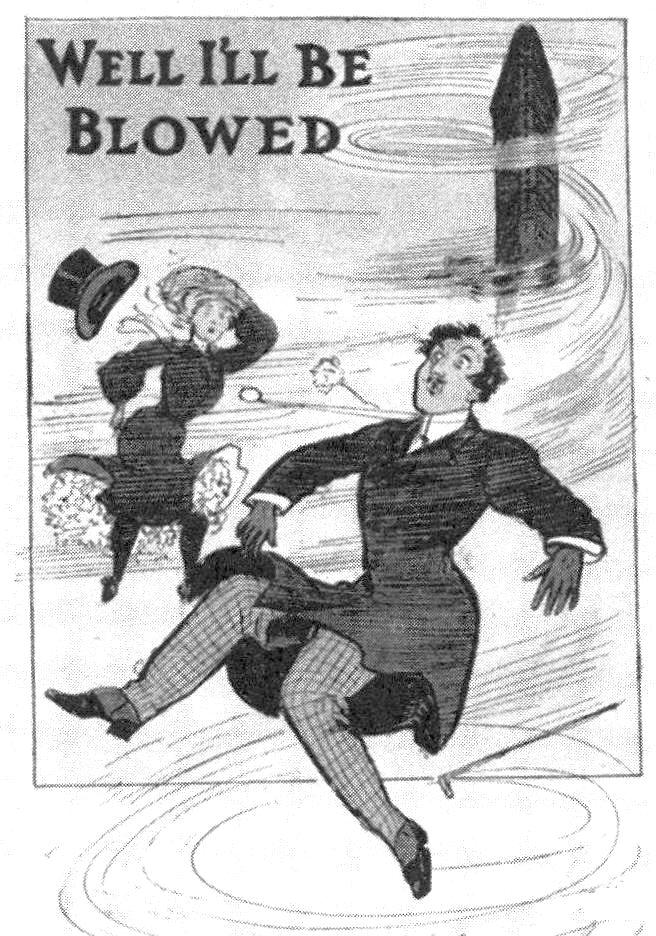
A postcard from 1905 with the Flatiron Building in the background

The building's most common criticism focused on its structure, on the grounds that the "combination of triangular shape and height would cause the building to fall down". When construction began, locals placed bets on how far the debris would spread when the wind knocked the building down. This presumed susceptibility to damage had also given it the nickname "Burnham's Folly". The Brooklyn Daily Eagle was one of a few contemporary sources to describe the building's shape favorably, saying: "A triangle is the safest possible form of building, as the triangle is the strongest of the geometric form."

Due to the geography of the site, wind from the north would split around the building, downdrafts from above and updrafts from the vaulted area under the street combined to make the wind unpredictable. The winds raised women's skirts and scattered paper bills from pedestrians' pocketbooks. According to some accounts, this gave rise to the phrase "23 skidoo", sometimes spelled "23 skiddoo". Policemen would shout this phrase at men who tried to get glimpses of women's dresses being blown up by the winds swirling around the building due to the strong downdrafts. (Note: Goldberger 1981, p. 38 note 3: Andrew S. Dolkart. "The Architecture and Development of New York City: The Birth of the Skyscraper – Romantic Symbols", Columbia University. Retrieved May 15, 2007. "It is at a triangular site where Broadway and Fifth Avenue—the two most important streets of New York—meet at Madison Square, and because of the juxtaposition of the streets and the park across the street, there was a wind-tunnel effect here. In the early twentieth century, men would hang out on the corner here on Twenty-third Street and watch the wind blowing women's dresses up so that they could catch a little bit of ankle. This entered into popular culture and there are hundreds of postcards and illustrations of women with their dresses blowing up in front of the Flatiron Building. And it supposedly is where the slang expression '23 skidoo' comes from because the police would come and give the voyeurs the 23 skidoo to tell them to get out of the area.") Films from the Library of Congress confirm that the building's shape contributed to high winds around the intersection of Broadway, Fifth Avenue, and 23rd Street. The origin of the phrase "23 skidoo" itself is disputed; even before the building was constructed, the number "twenty-three" and the word "skidoo" were independently used as expressions of dismissal.

The winds allegedly also caused damage to neighboring structures, prompting some critics to request that the Flatiron Building be shortened or demolished. The winds prompted a lawsuit from a nearby property owner, and they were also blamed for the 1903 death of a bicycle messenger, who was blown into the street and run over by a car. Newspapers of the time also claimed that "every window in the building" would break in high winds, although the American Architect and Building News observed that only a few windows broke during one such instance of high winds. Pedestrians were initially reluctant to walk on the same side of the street as the Flatiron Building because of concerns over the wind gusts, but these concerns had largely dissipated by the mid-20th century.

=== Media ===
Movie showing street life and the Flatiron Building, 1902

One of the first films to depict the Flatiron Building was created by Robert Bonine, who used a kinetograph to film the building on October 8, 1902, a week after the building opened. In the 1958 comedy film Bell, Book and Candle, James Stewart and Kim Novak were filmed on top of the Flatiron Building in a romantic clinch. For Warren Beatty's 1980 film Reds, the base of the building was used for a scene with Diane Keaton. It is shown in the 1998 film Godzilla, where it is accidentally destroyed by the US Army while in pursuit of the titular kaiju. It is depicted as the headquarters of the Daily Bugle, for which Peter Parker is a freelance photographer, in Sam Raimi's Spider-Man trilogy, and once again in The Spectacular Spider-Man animated series. It is shown in the Teenage Mutant Ninja Turtles TV series as well. In the comic book series The Boys and its television adaptation, it is depicted as the headquarters of the titular CIA black ops group.

In 2013, the Whitney Museum of American Art installed a life-sized 3D-cutout replica of Edward Hopper's 1942 painting Nighthawks in the Flatiron Art Space in the building's prow. Although Hopper said his picture was inspired by a diner in Greenwich Village, the prow is reminiscent of the painting, and was selected to display the two-dimensional cutouts. In 2014, the Lego Architecture series produced a model of the Flatiron Building to add to their series of landmarks. The subsequent New York City set, introduced in 2015, also included the building.

In part because of its unusual shape and prominent location, the Flatiron Building has been depicted in books and postcards worldwide. It was also depicted on other pieces of merchandise, such as plates, mugs, and various tchotchkes. The Flatiron Building was the subject of a book, The Flatiron: The New York Landmark and the Incomparable City that Arose With It, published in 2010 and written by Alice Sparberg Alexiou. It was the focus of the 2014 PBS documentary Treasures of New York: The Flatiron Building.

==== Photographs ====
Two noted photographs

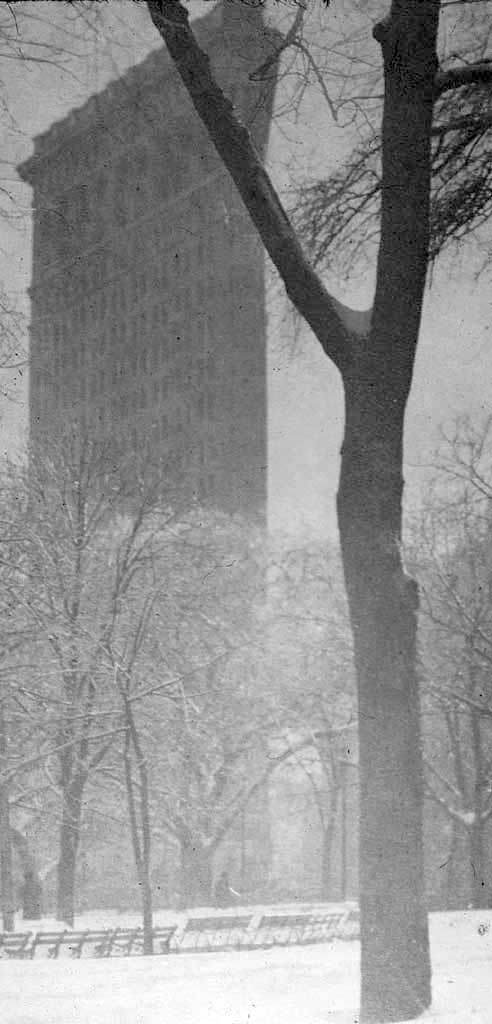
Alfred Stieglitz (1903)

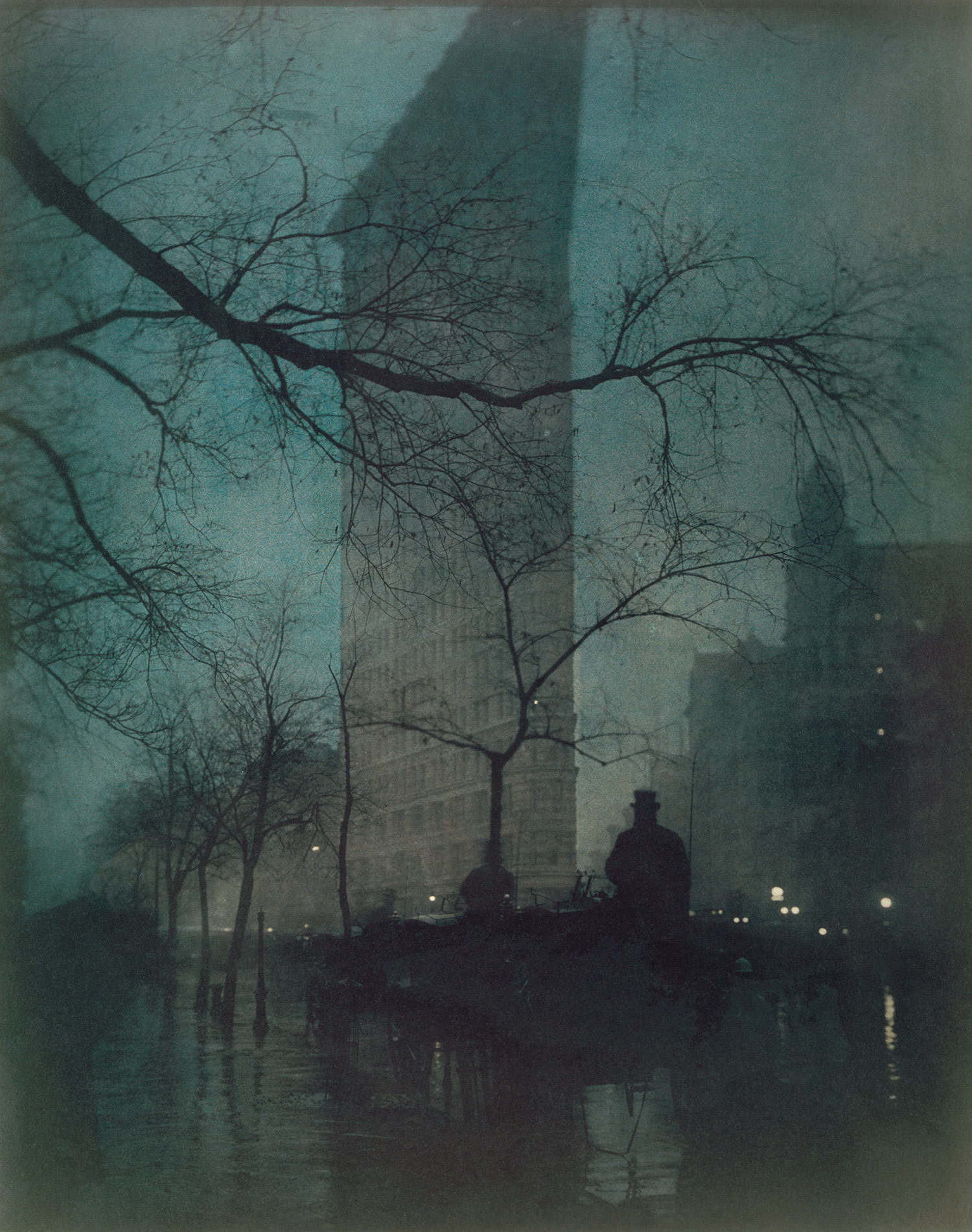
Edward Steichen (1904)

Over the years, the Flatiron Building has been one of New York City's most photographed buildings, attracting the attention of artists and photographers. The building's exterior remains a popular spot for tourist photographs, making it what WLIW called "possibly one of the most photographed buildings in the world".

The Flatiron Building was the subject of one of Edward Steichen's atmospheric photographs, taken on a wet wintry late afternoon in 1904, as well as a memorable image by Alfred Stieglitz taken the year before, to which Steichen was paying homage. Stieglitz reflected on the dynamic symbolism of the building, noting upon seeing it one day during a snowstorm that "... it appeared to be moving toward me like the bow of a monster ocean steamer – a picture of a new America still in the making." He remarked that the Flatiron had a comparable effect on New York as the Parthenon had on Athens. When Stieglitz's photograph was published in Camera Work, his friend Sadakichi Hartmann, a writer, painter and photographer, accompanied it with an essay on the building: "A curious creation, no doubt, but can it be called beautiful? Beauty is a very abstract idea ... Why should the time not arrive when the majority without hesitation will pronounce the 'Flat-iron' a thing of beauty?"

Besides Stieglitz and Steichen, photographers such as Alvin Langdon Coburn and Jessie Tarbox Beals took photographs of the building. Painters of the Ashcan School, like John Sloan, Everett Shinn, and Ernest Lawson also painted images of the building, as did Paul Cornoyer and Childe Hassam. Lithographer Joseph Pennell, illustrator John Edward Jackson, and French Cubist Albert Gleizes all took the Flatiron as the subject of their work. The edifice was also depicted in Samuel Halpert's 1919 painting Flatiron Building, later placed in the Metropolitan Museum of Art's collection.

=== Architectural influence ===
Unlike other structures, such as the Seagram Building or New York City's brownstone houses, the Flatiron Building's shape was rarely copied by other structures in the city until the early 21st century. This was in part because many buildings occupied rectangular sites on Manhattan's street grid. Developers also tended to avoid buying oddly-shaped plots, as their unconventional dimensions were hard to market to potential tenants. Consequently, in the early 20th century, the Flatiron Building was one of only two major buildings that were developed at the intersection of Broadway and another north–south avenue; the other was the Times Tower. Although some buildings in lower Manhattan, such as One Wall Street Court, also contain a flatiron shape, they generally were not as well known as the Flatiron Building. A shortage of available land lots prompted the development of other triangular structures in the city during the 2010s, such as 10 Sullivan and 100 Franklin.

=== Landmark designations ===
In 1966, the New York City Landmarks Preservation Commission (LPC) designated the Flatiron Building as a city landmark. The structure, along with the Manhattan Municipal Building, were the first two skyscrapers in New York City to be protected as city landmarks. The Flatiron Building was added to the National Register of Historic Places (NRHP) in 1979. The structure was re-added to the NRHP in 1989 when it was designated a National Historic Landmark. The LPC further designated the Flatiron Building as part of the Ladies' Mile Historic District, a city landmark district created in 1989.

== Gallery ==
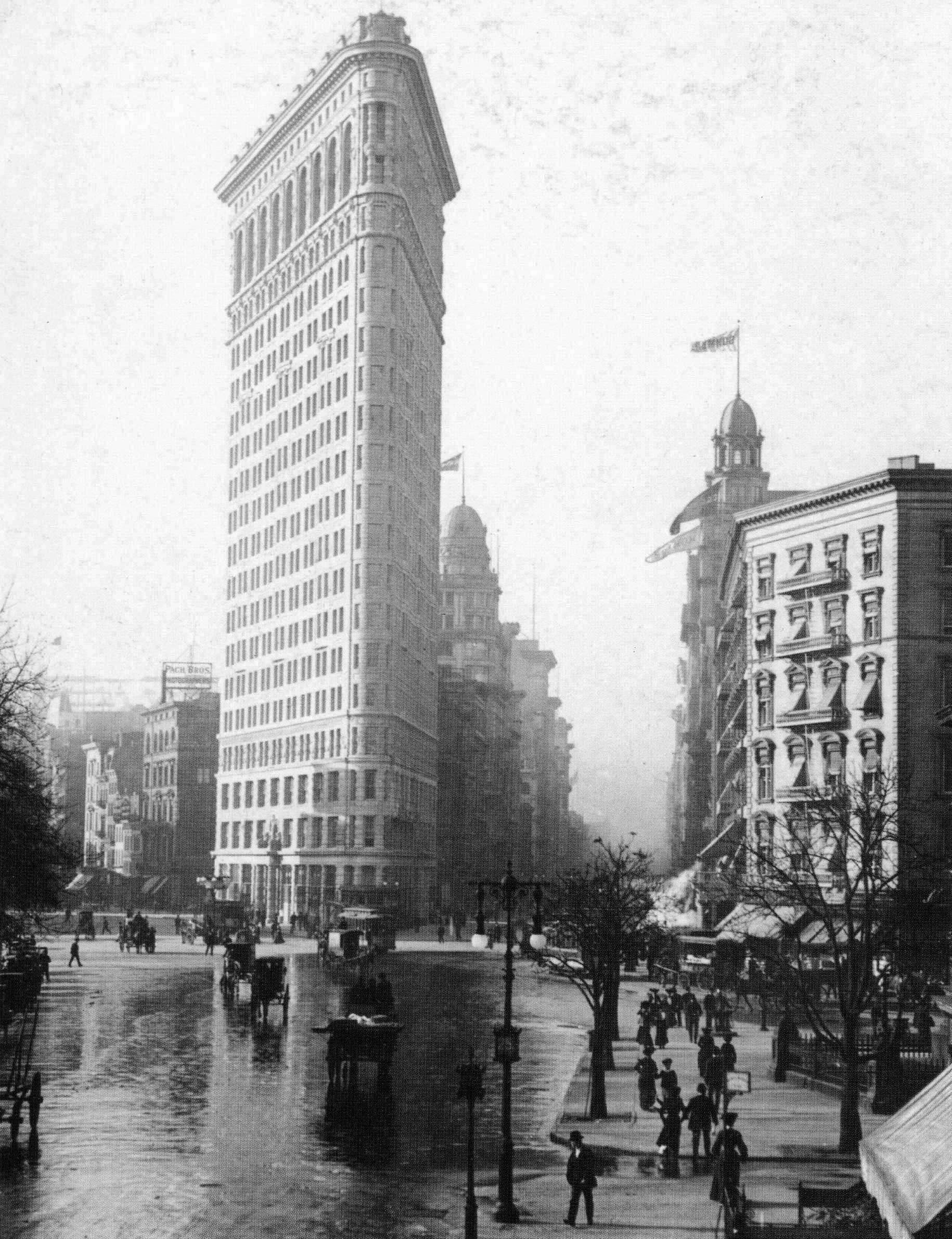
The building c. 1903

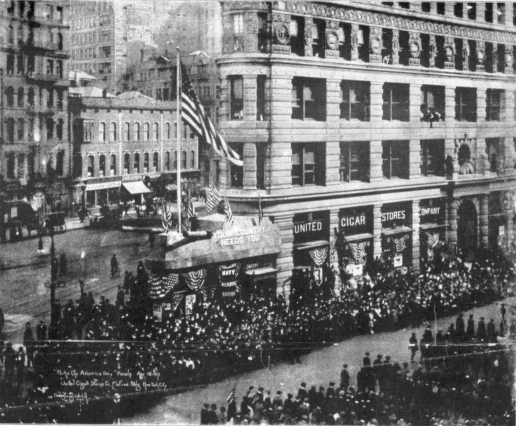
A Navy recruiting station in the building's "cowcatcher" during the pre–World War I Wake Up America Day parade
April 19, 1917

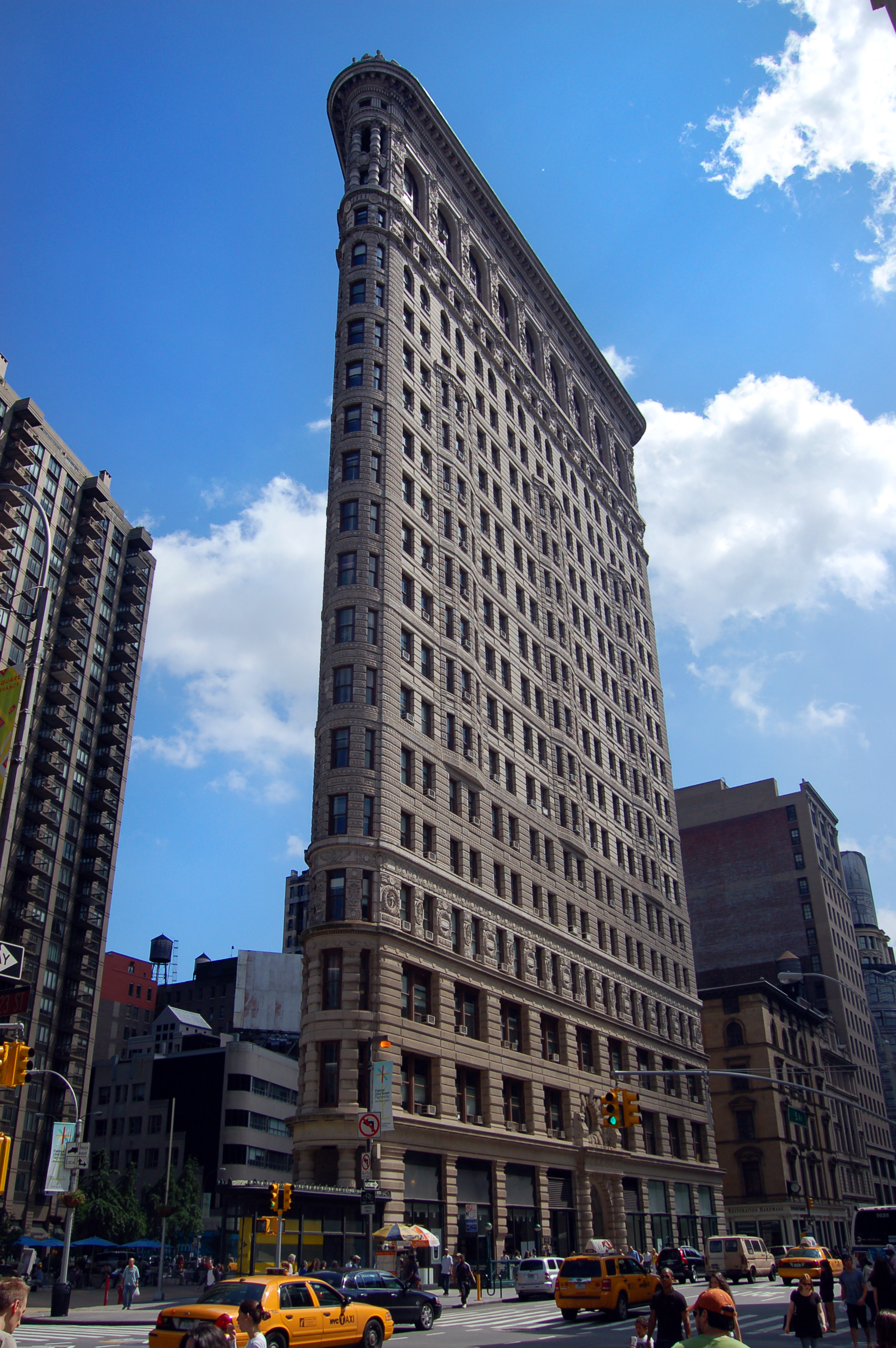
Side view

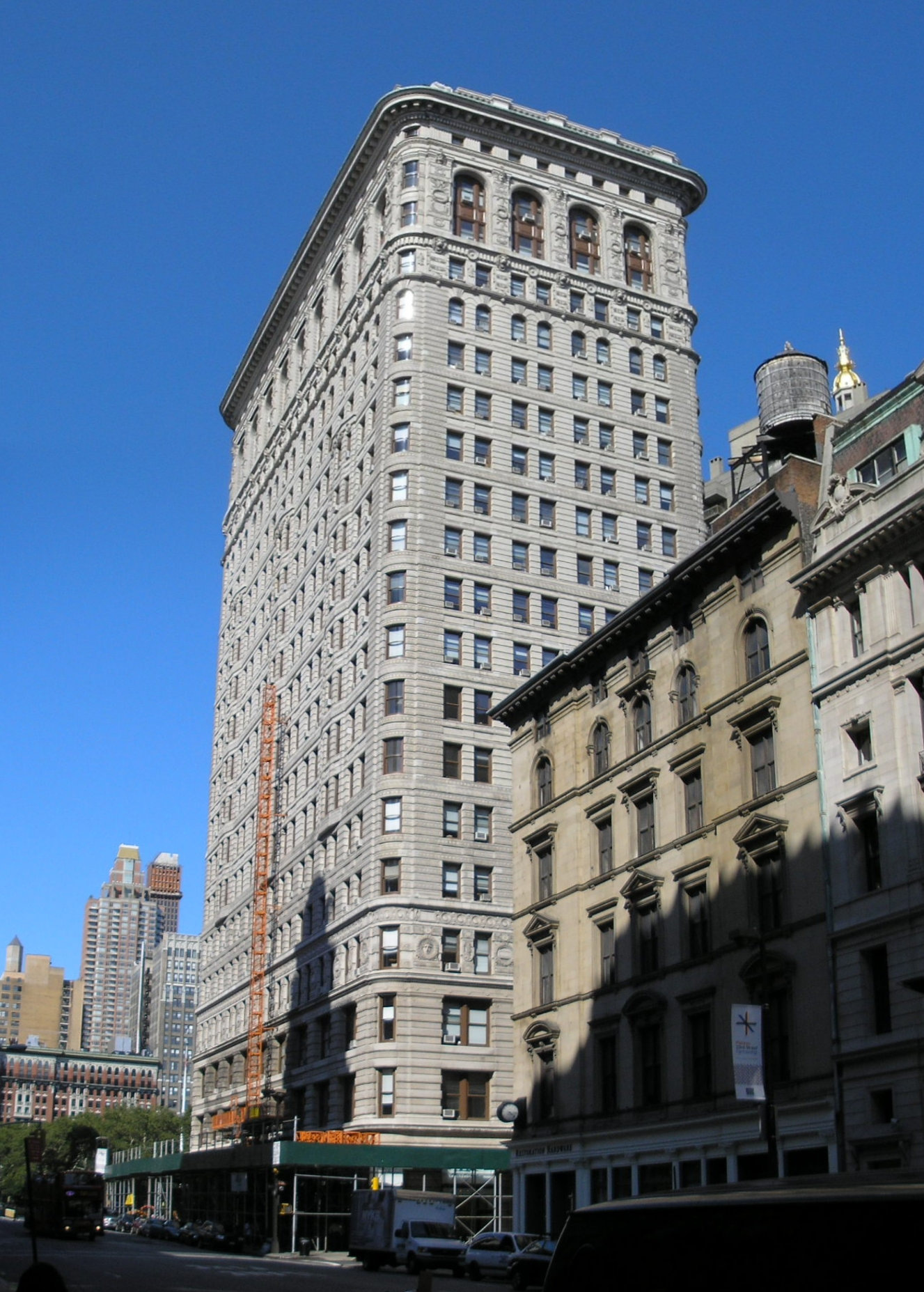
Rear view

== See also ==
- Early skyscrapers – Tall commercial buildings built between 1884 and 1945
- List of flatiron buildings – List of buildings shaped like a clothing iron
- List of National Historic Landmarks in New York City
- List of New York City Designated Landmarks in Manhattan from 14th to 59th Streets
- National Register of Historic Places listings in Manhattan from 14th to 59th Streets
