= 10 Sullivan =

Residential building in Manhattan, New York

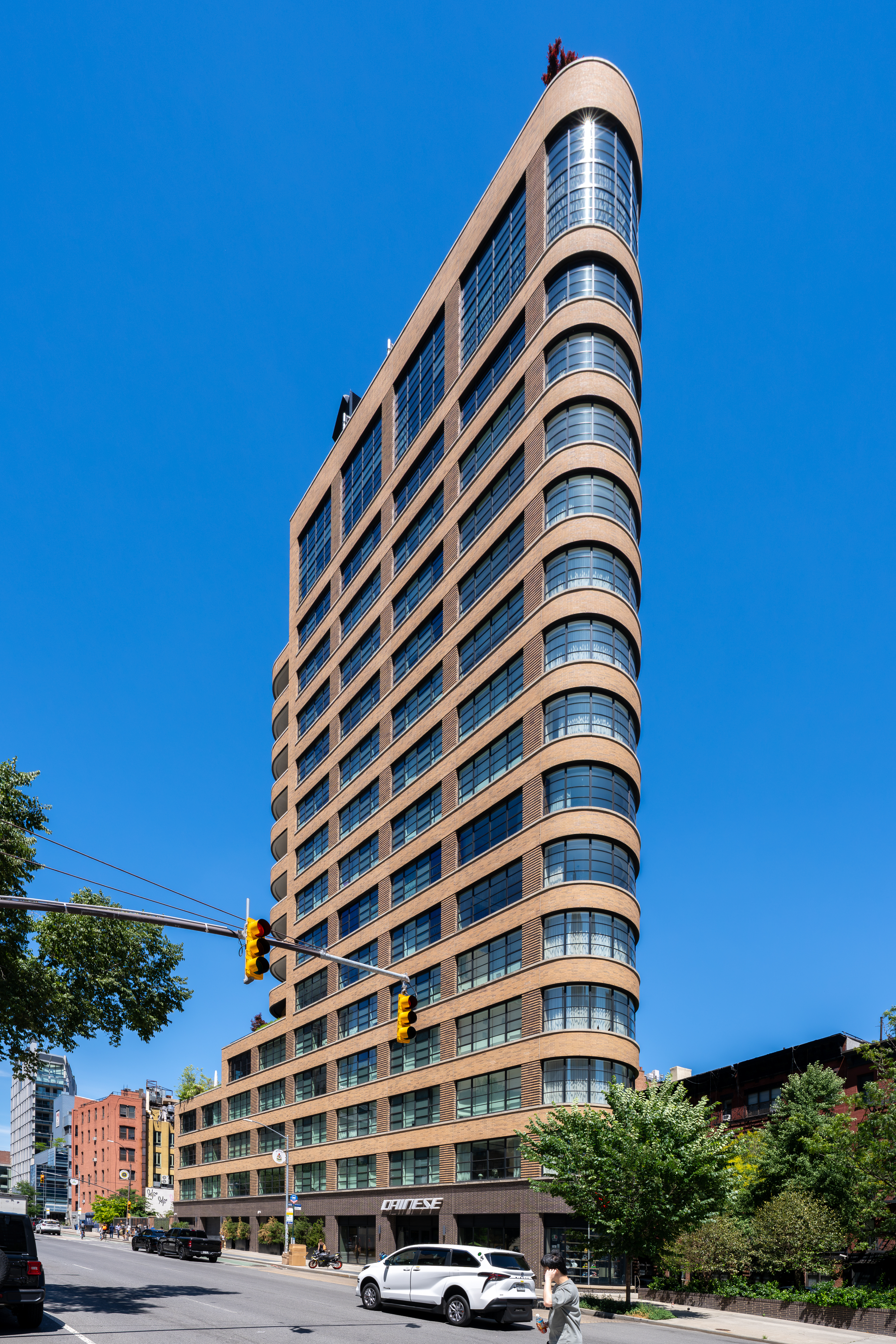
- Interactive map of the 10 Sullivan area

General information
- Status: Completed
- Type: Residential
- Architectural style: Modernism
- Location: 120 Sixth Avenue, Manhattan, New York City, U.S.
- Coordinates: 40°43′28″N 74°00′14″W
- Construction started: 2014
- Completed: 2016

Height
- Architectural: 204 feet

Technical details
- Floor count: 16

Design and construction
- Architects: Tamarkin Co. Montroy Andersen DeMarco
- Developer: Madison Equities & PMG
- Structural engineer: Robert Silman Associates

10 Sullivan is a triangular sixteen-story residential building in the SoHo neighborhood of Manhattan in New York City. The building occupies a site between Sixth Avenue and Sullivan Street adjacent to the Holland Tunnel entrance. It was developed between 2014 and 2016 by Property Market Group and Madison Equities, and was designed by Tamarkin Co.

== History ==
Developers originally considered building a large tower in the northern portion of the lot, with the remainder set aside for a garden space. This configuration was originally replaced with a wedge-shaped design. The site was originally zoned for commercial development, until the developers appealed to the New York City Office of Administrative Trials and Hearings in order to change the zoning to residential.

During construction and following the building's sluggish sales, 10 Sullivan was at the center of a bitter feud between the two developers, Madison Equities and Property Markets Group (PMG). Madison Equities principal Robert Gladstone sued his partner Kevin Maloney of PMG, claiming among other things that PMG had sabotaged their joint condo development through negligence and mismanagement that cost the partners to lose out on $30 million in profits. Gladstone's lawsuit also blamed PMG for 10 Sullivan's poor sales performance. The case was eventually dismissed.

== Architecture ==
The building evokes the Flatiron Building in its shape, and is one of several triangular buildings in New York, including 47 Plaza Street West. Cary Tamarkin, the building's architect, has said the design is not an homage, but a necessary adaptation to the shape of the lot. The exterior of the building is brick, and reminiscent of historical buildings in SoHo.

The ground floor is commercial; the residential portion is split between apartments in the central building and townhouses in the northern portion of the lot. All units include high ceilings. Other amenities include a fitness center, storage spaces, and private elevators.

Matt A.V. Chaban, writing for The New York Times has referred to the shape of the building as "celebrat[ing] its wedge-shaped site".
