= Ely Jacques Kahn Jr. =

American writer (1916–1994)

- Born: December 4, 1916; New York City, US
- Died: May 28, 1994 (aged 77); Holyoke, Massachusetts, US
- Education: Harvard University
- Occupation: Writer
- Spouse: Eleanor Munro (m. 1969)
- Father: Ely Jacques Kahn
- Relatives: Joan Kahn (sister); Rena Rosenthal (aunt)

Ely Jacques Kahn Jr. (December 4, 1916 – May 28, 1994) was an American writer with The New Yorker for five decades.

== Biography ==
Born in New York City, he was the son of architect Ely Jacques Kahn, and the brother of mystery editor and anthologist Joan Kahn. He attended the Horace Mann School and Harvard University, where he took his B.A. in 1937. He was hired by St. Clair McKelway at The New Yorker in 1937 and his first byline appeared there in the April 3, 1937 issue. Before World War II, he was drafted and served in the U.S. Army from 1941 to 1945. The New Yorker publishing 39 of his pieces on Army life that were later collected in book form.

His long career with the magazine resulted in numerous books on such varied subjects as Coca-Cola, Lesley J. McNair, the Trust Territory of the Pacific Islands, Harvard University, Herbert Bayard Swope, Frank Sinatra, Dwayne O. Andreas of Archer Daniels Midland, and the Postal Inspection Service. However, his multi-part series on grain, which was published in book form as "Staffs of Life" in 1985, was criticized by some as an example of the self-indulgent journalism that marked The New Yorker during the 1970s and '80s.

Kahn lived in Scarborough-on-Hudson, New York, for more than 20 years, and was a member of the Briarcliff Manor Fire Department. He taught writing at Columbia University from 1974 to 1977.

His book The New Yorker and Me (New York: G.P. Putnam's, 1979) is a diary interspersed with memories of his life, the magazine, and its editor William Shawn—whom Kahn calls "The Iron Mouse." His 1987 diary was released as Year of Change: More about the New Yorker and Me (New York: Viking, 1988).

== Death ==
Kahn died in a traffic accident on May 28, 1994, in Holyoke, Massachusetts, at the age of 77.

== Bibliography ==
=== Books ===
- Army Life, 1942
- G. I. Jungle, 1943
- McNair: Educator of an Army, 1945
- Fighting Divisions, 1945
- The Voice, 1947(Sinatra)
- Who, Me?, 1949
- The Peculiar War, 1952
- The Merry Partners: The Age and Stage of Harrigan and Hart, 1955
- The Big Drink: The Story of Coca-Cola, 1960
- The A Reporter Here and There, 1961
- The Stragglers, 1962
- The World of Swope, 1964
- A Reporter in Micronesia, 1966
- The Separated People: A Look at Contemporary South Africa, 1968
- Harvard: Through Change and Through Storm, 1969
- The Boston Underground Gourmet, 1972
- The First Decade: A Report on Independent Black Africa, 1972
- Fraud: The United States Postal Inspection Service and Some of the Fools and Knaves It Has Known, 1973
- The American People, 1973
- The China Hands: America's Foreign Service Officers and What Befell Them, 1975
- Georgia from Rabun Gap to Tybee Light, 1978
- Far-Flung and Footloose, 1979
- The New Yorker and Me, 1979
- Jock: The Life and Times of John Hay Whitney, 1981
- The Staffs of Life, 1985
- The Problem Solvers: A History of Arthur D. Little, Inc., 1986
- Year of Change: More about the New Yorker and Me, 1988.
- Supermarketer to the World: The Story of Dwayne Andreas, 1991.

=== Essays and reporting ===
- "Encore les Marshmallows". The Talk of the Town. The New Yorker. 24 (47): 20–21. January 15, 1949.
- "The gentleman from New York - I". The New Yorker. 25 (48): 31–45. January 21, 1950. (Note: Profile of US Representative Jacob K. Javits.)
- "The gentleman from New York - II". The New Yorker. 25 (49): 30–42. January 28, 1950.
- "Notes and Comment". The Talk of the Town. The New Yorker. 25 (50): 21. February 4, 1950. (Note: Refugees and Displaced Persons (DPs).)

———————
