= Thomas Munro (art historian) =

American art historian (1897–1974)

- Born: February 15, 1897; Omaha, Nebraska
- Died: April 14, 1974 (aged 77); Sarasota, Florida
- Education: Columbia University (BA, MA, PhD)
- Occupations: Art historian, curator
- Employer(s): Western Reserve University; Cleveland Museum of Art
- Children: Eleanor Munro

Thomas Munro (15 February 1897 in Omaha, Nebraska – April 14, 1974 in Sarasota, Florida) was an American philosopher of art and professor of art history at Western Reserve University. He served as Curator of Education for the Cleveland Museum of Art for 36 years (1931–67).

== Biography ==
Munro was educated at Amherst College and received his B.A. and M.A. from Columbia University, where he was influenced by philosopher and educator John Dewey. Munro served as a sergeant with the psychological services of the Army Medical Corps before returning to Columbia to get his Ph.D. in 1920.

Munro was hired by Albert C. Barnes to be assistant educational director of the Barnes Foundation in 1924 while serving as a visiting professor at the University of Pennsylvania. He taught at Rutgers University from 1928 to 1931, when he accepted a joint appointment at the Cleveland Museum of Art and professor of art history at Case Western Reserve University.

Munro retired in 1967 from both roles, retaining emeritus status at Case Western until his death in 1974. He is survived by Eleanor Munro, art editor and writer.

== Notable roles ==
- Visiting professor of modern art at the University of Pennsylvania (1924–27)
- Member of the philosophy faculty at Rutgers University (1928–31)
- Founder in 1942 of the American Society for Aesthetics
- Editor (1945–64) of the Journal of Aesthetics and Art Criticism

== Publications ==
- (1926) Primitive Negro Sculpture New York: Harcourt Brace & Company
- (1928) The Scientific Method in Aesthetics. PDF at Internet Archive
- (1941) Knowledge and Control in the Field of Aesthetics, The Journal of Aesthetics and Art Criticism Vol. 1, No. 1
- (1949) The Arts and Their Interrelations At Internet Archive
- (1956) Art education, its philosophy and psychology: selected essays New York: Liberal Arts Press. At Internet Archive.
- (1963) Evolution in the Arts, and Other Theories of Culture History
- (1960) The Creative Arts in American Education: The Interrelation of the Arts in Secondary Education Harvard University Press
- (1965) Oriental Aesthetics
- (1969) Art and Violence Journal of Aesthetics and Art Criticism
