= Eleanor Munro =

American art critic and writer (1928–2022)

- Born: Eleanor Carroll Munro; March 28, 1928; Brooklyn, New York, U.S.
- Died: April 1, 2022 (aged 94); Rye, New Hampshire, U.S.
- Education: Smith College (BA); Columbia University (MA)
- Known for: Associate editor, art writer and reviewer, ARTnews; The New Republic, The Atlantic, Saturday Review, Vogue, Ms.
- Notable work: Originals: American Women Artists, Simon & Schuster
- Movement: Contemporary art, feminist art, art by women and people of color
- Spouses: Alfred M. Frankfurter (m. 1960; d. 1965) Ely Jacques Kahn Jr. (m. 1969; d. 1994)
- Children: 2
- Awards: Cleveland Arts Prize for Literature (1988); Women's Caucus for Art Lifetime Achievement Award

Eleanor Carroll Munro (March 28, 1928 – April 1, 2022) was an American art critic, art historian, writer, and editor. She was known for her work on women artists. Some of her published books included The Encyclopedia of Art (1961), Originals: American Women Artists (1979); Memoirs of a Modernist's Daughter (1988), Through the Vermilion Gates (1971), and On Glory Roads: a Pilgrim's Book about Pilgrimage (1988). Munro was also known for her published interviews with women artists of note including Louise Bourgeois, Helen Frankenthaler, Jennifer Bartlett, Julie Taymor, Louise Nevelson, Maya Lin, and Kiki Smith. Munro received the Cleveland Arts Prize for Literature in 1988.

== Early life ==
Munro was born on March 28, 1928, in Brooklyn. Her mother, Lucile Nadler, was a pianist, and her father, Thomas Munro, an art educator. Her family moved to Cleveland, Ohio, when her father found a job with the Cleveland Museum of Art as a curator. Munro studied at the Hathaway Brown School and later graduated from Smith College in 1959. She studied in Paris at the Sorbonne University before returning to the United States to complete her master's degree at Columbia University.

== Career ==
Munro started her career in the 1950s as an associate editor and then managing editor of ARTnews magazine and Art News Annual. She later went on to be a contributing editor to The New Republic, The Atlantic, Saturday Review, Vogue, and Ms. Magazine, among others. In 1979, her book Originals: American Women Artists was published. The book has profiles and interviews with noted women artists of the time including Georgia O'Keeffe, Alice Neel, Anne Truitt, Joan Mitchell, and others. In the book, she documented some of the struggles faced by the women artists and the evolving art landscape. Throughout her career, she published interviews with women artists including Louise Bourgeois, Helen Frankenthaler, Jennifer Bartlett, Julie Taymor, Louise Nevelson, Maya Lin, and Kiki Smith. In addition to writing on art and artists, she also wrote on travel. Her 1987 book On Glory Roads: A Pilgrim’s Book About Pilgrimage had her visiting Jerusalem, Buddhist temples in Indonesia, and Hindu temples in India bringing together travel from the lens of pilgrims.

Munro was awarded the Cleveland Arts Prize for Literature in 1988; and the Women's Caucus for Art Lifetime Achievement Award in 2003. In 1990s, she was visiting fellow at the Woodrow Wilson National Fellowship Federation, Princeton, New Jersey. In 1991, Munro was awarded a residency fellowship at the Bellagio Study Center in Lake Como, Italy. In 1984, she received a residency fellowship to Yaddo in Saratoga Springs, New York.

Munro served on the board of directors of the Truro Center for Arts, (Massachusetts) starting in 1979; the board of The Living Theatre, New York City, starting in 1989; and was a member of the Poets, Playwrights, Editors, Essayists and Novelists Association, the American International Association Art Critics, and the Authors Guild.

== Personal life ==
Munro married Alfred M. Frankfurter, editor of the ARTnews magazine, in 1960; they remained married until his death in 1965. The couple had two sons, one of whom died in 1993. In 1969, she married Ely Jacques Kahn Jr., a writer with The New Yorker. Kahn predeceased her in 1994.

Munro died on April 1, 2022, in Rye, New Hampshire, from complications of dementia. She was aged 94.

== Books ==
- Munro, Eleanor C. (1961). The encyclopedia of art, painting, sculpture, architecture, and ornament, from prehistoric times to the twentieth century. New York: Golden Press.
- Munro, Eleanor C.; Rudorff, Raymond (1961). Art treasures of the world: an illustrated history in colour; with short biographies of artists; painting, sculpture, architecture, and ornament, from prehistoric times to the twentieth century. London; New York: Hamlyn.
- Munro, Eleanor C.; Rudorff, Raymond; Vandegrift, Kate (1964). Art treasures of the world: an illustrated history in color. London.
- Munro, Eleanor C. (1971). Through the vermilion gates: a journey into China's past. New York: Pantheon Books. ISBN 978-0-394-82034-7.
- Munro, Eleanor C. (1987). On glory roads: a pilgrim's book about pilgrimage. New York: Thames and Hudson. ISBN 978-0-500-24127-1.
- Munro, Eleanor C. (1988). Memoir of a modernist's daughter. New York: Viking. ISBN 978-0-670-81605-7.
- Munro, Eleanor C. (1989). Wedding readings: centuries of writing and rituals on love and marriage. New York: Viking. ISBN 978-0-670-81088-8.
- Munro, Eleanor C. (2000). Readings for remembrance: a collection for funerals and memorial services. New York: Penguin Books. ISBN 978-0-14-028064-7.
