= Thomas McCormack (writer) =

American writer and publisher (1932–2024)

Thomas McCormack (January 5, 1932 – June 15, 2024) was an American book-publishing executive, editor, author, and playwright.

== Publishing ==
McCormack was born in Boston, Massachusetts, on January 5, 1932. When he was eight, the family moved to Stamford, Connecticut. After showing precocity in elementary school, he went to Stamford High School where he asserts he "had a double-major of sports-and-girls" and graduated with a drab academic record. At college, a sports-injury sent him from the playing fields to his desk. In 1954 after majoring in philosophy he received a B.A. summa cum laude from Brown University, with a 4.0 Grade Point Average that was the first at Brown since before World War II. He served in the U.S. Army at the American Embassy in Rome. Upon his return he did graduate work as a Woodrow Wilson Fellow at Harvard. Following a period writing radio news on station WSTC in Stamford, McCormack entered book publishing.

He began in 1959 at Doubleday, where he became an editor at Anchor Books, and the originating editor of Dolphin Books. He moved to Harper and Row where he started Perennial Books, then to New American Library to run Signet Classics and Mentor Books where he published Watson and Crick's "The Double Helix". Finally he joined St. Martin's Press and, eleven years after entering publishing, he was appointed the CEO. His maverick strategy – which included publishing more fiction than any other house in America – helped St. Martin's expand its annual billings from two-and-a-half-million dollars to over a quarter-billion. In the 1980s he had St. Martin's launch its own mass-market paperback line, the first hardcover house to do that since Simon and Schuster founded Pocket Books in 1939. Meantime he was editing bestsellers ranging from All Creatures Great and Small to The Silence of the Lambs.

In the late 1990s, after aiding in the sale of St. Martin's to the Holtzbrinck Publishing Group of Germany, McCormack resigned his role as chairman, CEO, and editorial director to pursue his interest in theater. For a year McCormack maintained a role in publishing by writing a regular column for Publishers Weekly, titled “The Cheerful Skeptic”. It was a mixture of humor and protest as he examined and repudiated much of the book-industry's "conventional wisdom". He was awarded the AAP's Curtis Benjamin Award for Creative Publishing, and the LMP's Lifetime Achievement Award. He lectured on publishing at Princeton and Harvard.

He was the author of Afterwords: Novelists on Their Novels and The Fiction Editor, the Novel, and the Novelist.

== Playwriting ==
McCormack wrote his first play, a one-act, American Roulette, just as he joined St. Martin's. It gained him a place in the Albee-Barr Playwrights Unit. American Roulette was subsequently staged in numerous regional theaters in the U.S. and Canada. Among the other young beginners with him in the Playwrights Unit were A.R. Gurney, Terrence McNally, Lanford Wilson, John Guare, and Sam Shepard.

McCormack, however, with new family and job responsibilities, suspended his playwriting for over two decades. His first full-length play, Endpapers, was produced in New York in the 2002–2003 season. Its cumulative audience of over 40,000 put it among the three or four most popular Off Broadway plays of the first decade of this century. His two produced plays are published by The Dramatists Play Service.

He was a regular contributor to an online forum: Aesthetics-L: Art, Aesthetics, and Philosophy. Prompted by this, McCormack began again to think and write about current issues in academic philosophy; more specifically, problems in philosophy of language, mind and ontology. This led him to write a full-length play about a philosopher-in-exile, INCOMPLETENESS, AND THE REST. Most recently, he's written an offshoot of that play—THE ARGUMENT, "An Introduction to Philosophy of Language and Mind, in One Act", which he describes as "a precarious attempt to combine what seem to be two mutually-antagonistic things: Serious problems of 21st century philosophy - and "theatricality".'

== Personal life ==
McCormack's wife, the former Sandra Danenberg, was a celebrated book editor of fiction. She died in 2013, eighteen years after manifesting the first symptoms of Alzheimer's disease. Their two children, Daniel and Jessie, also went to Brown; they are both now screenwriters and directors in Hollywood. Following their graduation, McCormack gave the university money to build The McCormack Family Theater on campus.

The development of DNA analysis allowed McCormack to have an unusual experience in his later years. He had been adopted (birth-name, Michael Griffin). When he was over sixty years old, he met for the first time his full sister, and seven other half-siblings. They were a part of his life thereafter. He lived in New York City.

McCormack died on June 15, 2024, at the age of 92.

== Sources ==
- Rothstein, Mervyn (August 28, 2002). "From Playwright to Publishing Company Chief, Then Back Again". The New York Times.
- CurtainUp interview: http://www.curtainup.com/mccormackinterview.html
- "Thomas McCormack, ‘One of the Great Contrarians of Publishing,’ Dies at 92",Publishers Weekly: https://www.publishersweekly.com/pw/by-topic/industry-news/Obituary/article/95309-thomas-mccormack-one-of-the-great-contrarians-of-publishing-dies-at-92.html
