= Witness for the Prosecution =

Witness for the Prosecution may refer to:

- "The Witness for the Prosecution", a 1925 short story by Agatha Christie
- The Witness for the Prosecution and Other Stories, a 1948 collection containing the short story
- Witness for the Prosecution (play), a 1953 play by Agatha Christie based on the short story
- Witness for the Prosecution (1957 film), directed by Billy Wilder based on the play
- Witness for the Prosecution (Hallmark Hall of Fame), a 1982 made-for-television adaptation
- The Witness for the Prosecution (TV series), a 2016 television serial on BBC One

== See also ==
- Witness to a Prosecution, an unrelated Hong Kong television drama series
- Witness (disambiguation)
- Prosecution witness
