= Witness (disambiguation) =

A witness is someone who has first-hand knowledge of something, such as a crime or wedding, and usually by seeing it.

Witness or The witness may also refer to:

== Arts and media ==
=== Fictional characters ===
- The Witness, the main antagonist of Destiny's Light and Darkness saga, from Destiny to Destiny 2: The Final Shape
- The Witness (character), several characters by Marvel Comics

=== Books ===
- Witnesses, different documents of a single, original text in textual criticism
- Witness (memoir), an autobiography by Whittaker Chambers
- Witness (novel), a 2001 verse novel of historical fiction by Karen Hesse
- Witness (Milligan book), a 2020 non-fiction book by Louise Milligan
- Witness: Passing the Torch of Holocaust Memory to New Generations, 2015, by and about Holocaust survivors

=== Films ===
- The Witness (1969 French film), a drama
- The Witness (1969 Hungarian film), a satirical film, also known as A tanú
- Witness (1985 film), directed by Peter Weir, starring Harrison Ford
- Witness (1988 film), a Malayalam film
- The Witness (1992 film), a short film starring Elijah Wood and Gary Sinise
- Witness (1995 film), an Indian film
- Witness (2022 film), a 2022 Indian Tamil-language drama
- The Witness (2000 film), by James LaVeck and Jenny Stein
- Witnesses (2003 film), a Croatian film
- The Witnesses, a 2007 French film by André Téchiné
- The Witness (2012 film), a Philippine film
- The Witness (2015 Chinese film), a crime drama
- The Witness (2015 American film), a documentary about the murder of Kitty Genovese
- The Witness (2018 film), a South Korean thriller
- Witnesses (2018 film), a historical drama by Konstantin Fam
- The Witness (2024 film), an Austrian-German crime drama

=== Games ===
- The Witness (1983 video game), an interactive fiction computer game
- The Witness (2016 video game), an exploration-puzzle game

=== Music ===
==== Groups ====
- Witness (American band), an Atlanta rock band
- Witness (gospel group), a female gospel quartet
- Witness (UK band), an English alternative rock band
- A Witness, an English post-punk band

==== Albums ====
- Witness (Benjamin Booker album), 2017
- Witness (Blessthefall album), 2009
- Witness (Dave Douglas album), 2001
- Witness (Halo James album), 1990
- Witness (Katy Perry album), 2017
- Witness (Modern Life Is War album), 2005
- Witness (Show of Hands album), 2006
- Witness (Spooky Tooth album), 1973
- Witness (Vola album), 2021
- The Witness (album), 2021, by Suuns

==== Songs ====
- "The Witness" (song), by members of the American rock band Tool
- "Witness", by Bo Bice from See the Light
- "Witness", by Immanuel Wilkins from The 7th Hand
- "Witness", by Joan as Police Woman from The Classic
- "Witness", by Jordan Feliz
- "Witness", by Sarah McLachlan from Surfacing
- "Witness", by Tori Amos from The Beekeeper
- "Witness", by Red Fang from Red Fang
- "Witness", by Wage War from Deadweight
- "Witness", by Xerath from III

=== Periodicals ===
- Witness (magazine), published by the Black Mountain Institute
- Witness (religious newspaper) edited by Hugh Miller in the mid nineteenth century
- The Witness (newspaper), a South African daily newspaper published in Pietermaritzburg

=== Plays ===
- Witness (play), 1968, by Terrence McNally
- Witness: Five Plays from the Gospel of Luke, a series of BBC Radio plays

=== Sculptures ===
- Witness (sculpture), 2023, by Shahzia Sikander
- Witness, a cast-iron sculpture by Antony Gormley
- Witness (altar), a monument in the Book of Joshua

=== Television ===
==== Series ====
- Witness (2006 TV programme), a documentary programme that airs on Al Jazeera English
- Witness (TV series), a Canadian documentary series (1992–2004)
- The Witness (TV series), a 1960–61 show broadcast on the CBS network
- Witnesses (TV series), a 2014 French series (Les Témoins)
- The Witness (2026 TV series), Netflix miniseries

==== Episodes ====
- "Witness" (Better Call Saul), 2017
- "Witness" (The Detectives), 1994
- "Witness" (Person of Interest), 2011
- "Witness" (The Secret Circle), 2012
- "The Witness" (Queen of Swords), 2000

== Other uses ==
- Witnessing or evangelism, a name for proselytising in Christianity
  - Jehovah's Witnesses, a restorationist Christian denomination whose name references the above
- Witness (mathematics), in mathematical logic, a specific value to be substituted for variable of an existential statement of the form such that is true
  - Witness, a number that plays a role in a primality test
- Witness (organization), a non-profit organization started by Peter Gabriel

== See also ==
- Eyewitness (disambiguation), various meanings
- Two witnesses
- Three Witnesses
- Eight Witnesses
