= Witness (sculpture) =

2023 sculpture by Shahzia Sikander

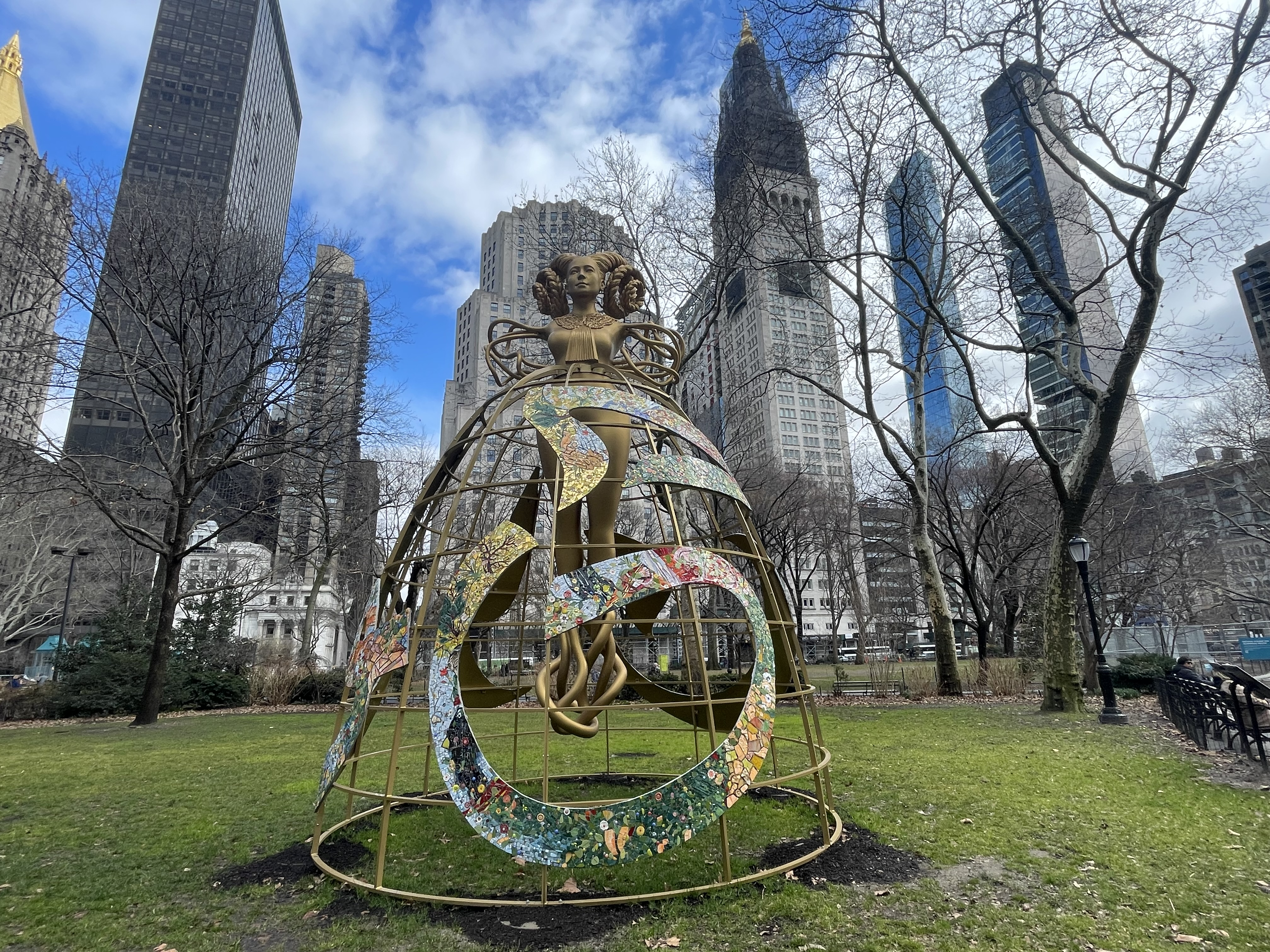
- Witness in Madison Square Park (2023)
- Artist: Shahzia Sikander
- Year: 2023
- Dimensions: 5.5 m (220 in)
- Condition: Partial damage; beheaded
- Location: Houston, Texas, United States

Witness is a 2023 sculpture by Pakistani-American sculptor Shahzia Sikander. It was part of her multimedia exhibition Havah…to breathe, air, life which took place in Madison Square Park, where the sculpture was installed in January 2023, and the nearby Courthouse of the Appellate Division, First Department of the Supreme Court of the State of New York. After its movement to the University of Houston, it was subject to protest by a Texas anti-abortion group, and on July 8, 2024 it was attacked and beheaded during Hurricane Beryl. Sikander notably requested that the sculpture remain on display with its damage exposed.

== Description and artist intention ==
Standing at 18 feet (5.5 m), the sculpture depicts a levitating woman whose hair was braided into two ram horns. She wears a large hoop skirt consisting of exposed crinoline and covered in Urdu calligraphy which is decorated with shards of painted mosaic pieces, as well as an intricate lace collar. She additionally has abstract branch-like, or tentacle-like arms.

Despite the lace collar's similarity to that worn by Ruth Bader Ginsburg, a proponent of abortion rights in the US legal system, the statue as a whole is, according to Sikander, not specifically intended as a comment on abortion or US Supreme Court justices as critics of the sculpture have stated. She intended it to create a general message about a woman’s power in the justice system. The hoop skirt was inspired by the stained-glass ceiling dome at the nearby courthouse, and according to Sikander symbolized a need to "break the legal glass ceiling." The braided 'horns' were intended to be a symbol of strength.

== History ==
Witness was Sikander's third sculptural work; her first in this medium was Promiscuous Intimacies in 2020. Prior to this, she had focused on miniature painting, stone and marble mosaics, room-sized installations, prints, photographs, and digital animation. It is similar to her second sculpture, NOW (2023), which was installed on the roof of the Courthouse of the Appellate Division, First Department of the Supreme Court of the State of New York; Witness itself was commissioned by the Madison Square Park Conservancy in Manhattan, which installed it in the park in January 2023 as part of a response to statues on the rooftop of the nearby courthouse which showed male lawgivers like Confucius and Moses. It stayed in the park for five months.

In February 2023, the work was installed on the campus of the University of Houston. A Christian anti-abortion group, Texas Right to Life, called the piece a "satanic" memorial of the late Supreme Court justice Ruth Bader Ginsburg, subsequently staging a protest demanding its removal. This caused the university to cancel an opening celebration of Sikander’s work which would have featured a scheduled talk from the artist, as well as an accompanying video work by Sikander. The sculpture was placed under increasing surveillance in subsequent months.

Early in the morning of July 8, 2024, during the strong weather and power outages of Hurricane Beryl, a vandal attacked the sculpture and beheaded it. Footage of the incident was obtained by campus police. Officials at the University of Houston reported the incident to the media on July 9, and Sikander was alerted to the damage. She called the attack "a very violent act of hate, and it should be investigated as a crime". Following the attack, an investigation was initiated and a tarp was placed over the statue while conservators examined the damage, though Sikander said that she didn't "want to 'repair' or conceal," and wanted "to 'expose,' leave it damaged. Make a new piece, and many more," as "a testament to the hatred and division that permeate our society." The university said it would respect these wishes, removing the tarp.
