= Statue of Roscoe Conkling =

Statue in Manhattan, New York, U.S.

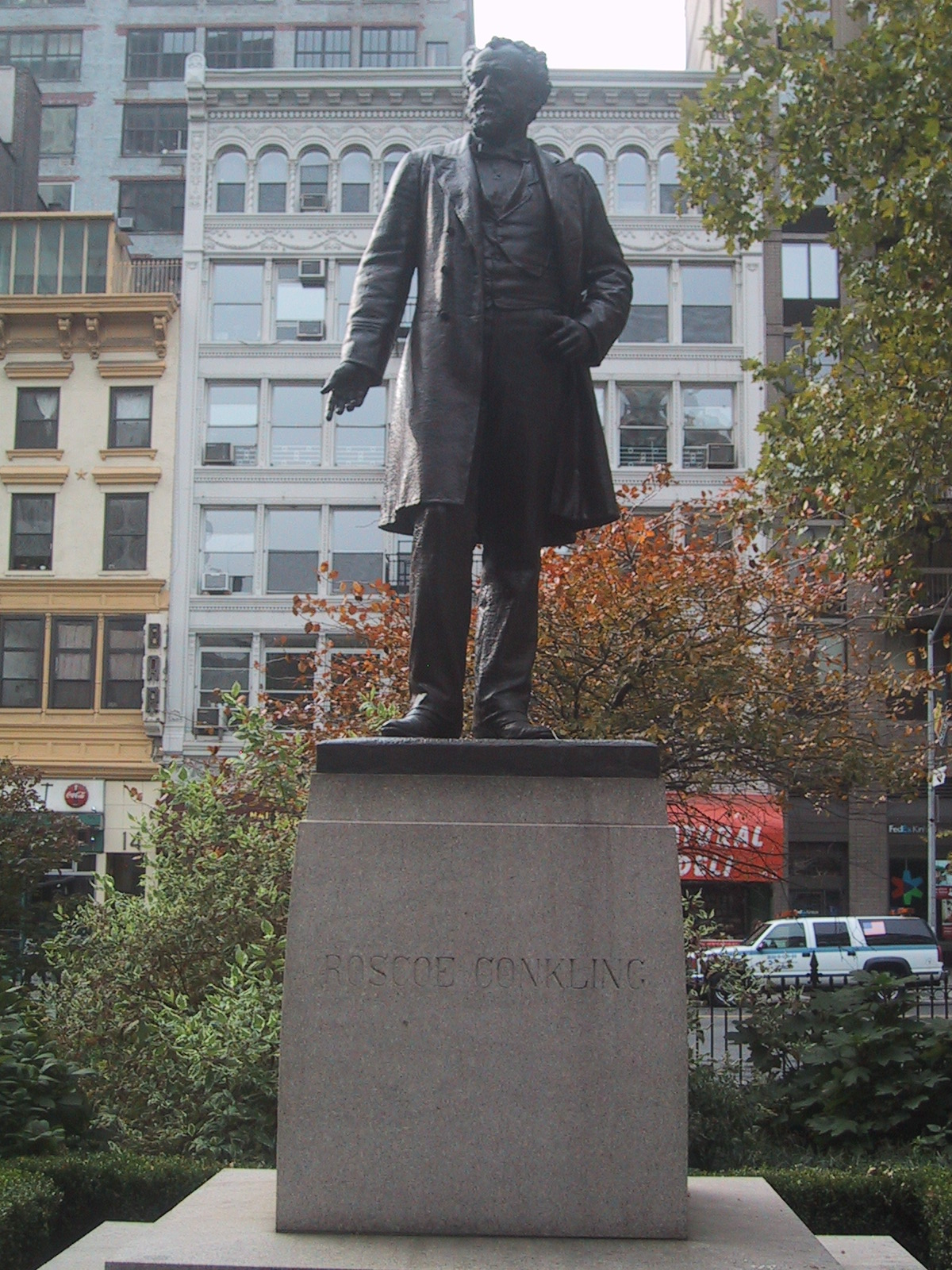
- The statue in 2006
- Artist: John Quincy Adams Ward
- Subject: Roscoe Conkling
- Location: New York City, New York, United States; 40.741236°N 73.988207°W

An outdoor sculpture of Roscoe Conkling by John Quincy Adams Ward is installed near Madison Avenue and 23rd Street in Madison Square Park in Manhattan, New York.

== See also ==
- 1893 in art
