= Madison Square Park Fountain =

Fountain in Manhattan, New York, U.S.

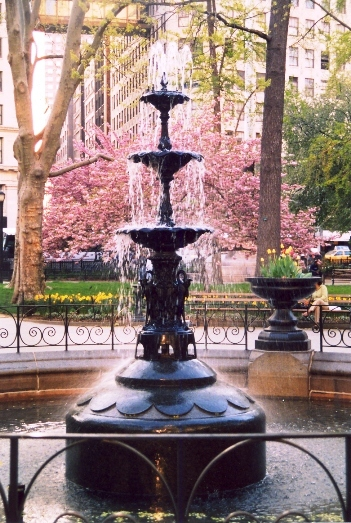
- Location: New York City, United States; 40°44′30″N 73°59′18″W

The Madison Square Fountain, also known as the Southern Fountain, is an ornamental fountain located in Madison Square Park in the Flatiron District of Manhattan, New York. It was the only one of several planned fountains to be realized. The current fountain is a modern reproduction of the original, installed in 1990 and renovated in 2015.

== History and description ==
The fountain was originally located on the site of the Old Post Office. It was begun in 1842 and completed in 1843, before being rededicated in Madison Square Park on June 28, 1867.

The fountain is made of North Jay granite. An inscription reads, THIS FOUNTAIN ORIGINALLY STOOD ON SITE OF OLD POST OFFICE. BEGUN IN 1842, COMPLETED JAN. 7, 1843. EMBELLISHED 1847. IT WAS REMOVED TO MADISON SQUARE PARK AND REDEDICATED JUNE 28, 1867. Urns surrounding the fountain are planted with flowers during summer months and other plants during the holiday season.

== See also ==
- 1843 in art
