= Eyewitness =

Eyewitness or eyewitness may refer to:

== Witness ==
- Witness, someone who has knowledge acquired through first-hand experience
  - Eyewitness memory
  - Eyewitness testimony

== Arts, entertainment, and media ==
=== Films ===
- Eyewitness (1956 film), a British film starring Donald Sinden
- Eyewitness (1970 film), a film starring Mark Lester
- Eyewitness (1981 film), a thriller starring William Hurt, Sigourney Weaver and Christopher Plummer
- Eyewitness (1999 film), nominated for an Academy Award for Best Short Documentary

=== Music ===
- Eyewitness (Royal Hunt album)
- Eyewitness (Kayak album)

=== Television ===
- Eye Witness (TV series), a 1953 American anthology series
- Eyewitness (British TV series), a 1995–1998 natural history series
- Eyewitness (American TV series), a 2016 drama series, based on Øyevitne
- Øyevitne (Eyewitness), a 2014 Norwegian drama series

=== Other arts, entertainment, and media ===
- Eyewitness a book by Ernest Dunlop Swinton
- Eyewitness Books
- The Eye-Witness, a magazine published by G. K. Chesterton
