= Brunswick Building =

Brunswick Building may refer to:

- Cook County Administration Building
- The Grand Madison
