= Manhattan Community Board 5 =

Manhattan Community District 5
- Community District
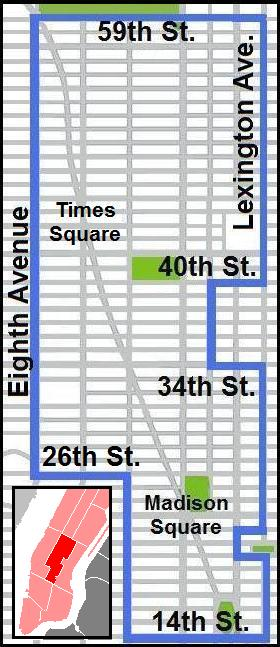
- Country: United States
- State: New York
- City: New York City
- Borough: Manhattan
- Neighborhoods: list: Diamond District; Flatiron District; Garment District; Gramercy Park; Herald Square; Koreatown; Murray Hill; NoMad (Madison Square North); Theater District; Times Square

Government
  - Chairperson: Bradley Sherburne
  - District Manager: Marisa Maack

Area
  - Land: 1.6 sq mi (4.1 km^{2})

Population (2010)
  - Total: 51,673
  - Density: 32,000/sq mi (12,000/km^{2})

Ethnicity
  - Hispanic and Latino Americans: 15.5%
  - African-American: 5.2%
  - White: 59.1%
  - Asian: 17.2%
  - Others: 3.0%
- Time zone: UTC−5 (Eastern)
  - Summer (DST): UTC−4 (EDT)
- ZIP codes: 10003, 10010, 10011, 10016, 10017, 10018, 10019, 10020, 10022, 10036, 100111
- Area code: 212, 646, and 332, and 917
- Police Precinct: 13th (website); Midtown South (14th) (website); Midtown North (18th) (website)
- Website: www.cb5.org,

Manhattan Community Board 5 is a New York City community board, part of the local government apparatus of the city, with the responsibility for the neighborhoods of Midtown, Times Square, most of the Theater District, the Diamond District, the Garment District, Herald Square, Koreatown, NoMad, Murray Hill and the Flatiron District, all in the borough of Manhattan. It is bounded by 59th Street on the north, Eighth Avenue, 26th Street, the Avenue of the Americas ("Sixth Avenue") on the west, 14th Street on the south, and Lexington Avenue on the east, excluding the area from 34th to 40th Streets between Madison and Lexington Avenues, and the area from 20th to 22nd Streets between Park Avenue South and Lexington Avenue/Irving Place.

Within the area under the Board's responsibility are all or part of the Murray Hill, Madison Square North, Ladies' Mile, Gramercy Park and East 17th Street/Irving Place historic districts. Business Improvement Districts in the area include Madison Avenue BID, East Midtown Association, Fifth Avenue BID, the Times Square Alliance, 47th Street BID, the Grand Central Partnership, Bryant Park Management, Garment Center District, 34th Street Partnership, Madison Square Park Conservancy, Flatiron/23rd Street Partnership, and Union Square Partnership.

Within its boundaries are the neighborhoods of Flatiron, Herald Square, Midtown, Midtown South, Times Square, and Union Square. It may also include portions of Gramercy Park and Murray Hill.

== Demographics ==
As of the 2010 Census, the Community Board's area has a population of 51,000, up from 44,000 in the 2000 Census (+17%). With a land area of 1.6 square miles, the District has a population density of 32,296 persons per square mile.

According to the American Community Survey, 59.1% are White (down from 72.3% in 2000), 5.2% are African-American (up from 4.4%), 17.2% are Asian or Pacific Islander (up from 14%), 15.5% are Hispanic (up from 6.7%), and 3% are another group.

A total of 30.8% of the area's population is foreign born.

The land area under the Board's purview is 1,046.4 acres, or 1.64 square miles (4.23 km^{2}).

== Built environment ==
=== Zoning ===
The majority of Manhattan 5's zoning by land area is Commercial (82.57%), followed by Manufacturing zoning (14.22%). Residences and Parks comprise 1.6% each.

=== Community assets ===
Manhattan 5 has 13 public schools, 7 public libraries, 23 hospitals and clinics, and 3 parks: Bryant Park, Madison Square Park, and Union Square Park.
