= Kanawha (1899 ship) =

US steam yacht and patrol vessel

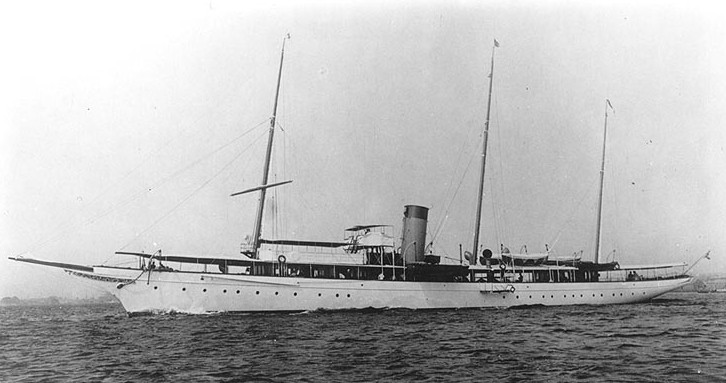
- Kanawha in civilian service, before World War I

History

United States
- Name: 1899: Kanawha; 1918: Piqua; 1919: Kanawha
- Namesake: 1899: Kanawha River; 1918: Piqua, Ohio
- Owner: 1900: John P Duncan; 1901: Henry H Rogers; 1910: Executors of HH Rogers; 1911: Abram Baudouine; 1915: Morton F Plant; 1915: John Borden
- Operator: 1917: United States Navy
- Port of registry: 1900: New York; 1916: Chicago
- Builder: Gas Engine & Power Co, and Charles L Seabury & Co, Morris Heights
- Cost: $250,000
- Launched: 27 May 1899
- Completed: 28 July 1899
- Refit: 1911
- Identification: US official number 161123; code letters KPDW; by 1918: call sign NND

General characteristics
- Type: steam yacht
- Tonnage: 475 GRT, 323 NRT
- Length: 208.4 ft (63.5 m)
- Beam: 24.4 ft (7.4 m)
- Draught: 9 ft 8 in (2.95 m) (mean)
- Depth: 14.8 ft (4.5 m)
- Installed power: 172 NHP, 3,200 ihp
- Propulsion: 2 × triple-expansion engines; 2 × screws
- Speed: 22 knots (41 km/h)
- Crew: with Black Star Line: 39

Kanawha was a steam yacht that was built in 1899. She was built for a member of the New York Yacht Club (NYYC), to replace a previous yacht of the same name. Henry Huttleston Rogers of Standard Oil bought her in 1901, and owned her until his death in 1909. The United States Navy used her as a patrol vessel in the First World War from 1917 to 1919. Marcus Garvey's Black Star Line acquired her in 1919 and renamed her Antonio Maceo.

== Building ==
John Paterson Duncan was a grocery wholesaler and member of the NYYC. He ordered Kanawha from the Gas Engine & Power Company and Charles L Seabury and Company of Morris Heights in the Bronx. She was to replace an 1896 yacht of the same name, which the US Government had requisitioned from Duncan for the US Navy to use in the Spanish–American War. The Government paid Duncan $50,000 for the first Kanawha. He paid Seabury's $250,000 for the second one.

The new Kanawha was launched on May 27, 1899. Her registered length was 208.4 ft (63.5 m), her beam was 24.4 ft (7.4 m), and her depth was 14.8 ft (4.5 m). Her tonnages were 475 GRT and 323 NRT. She had twin screws, each driven by a three-cylinder triple-expansion engine. The combined power of her twin engines was rated at 172 NHP or 3,200 ihp, and gave her a speed of 22 knots (41 km/h). In 1902, one newspaper compared her with Cornelius Vanderbilt III's 233-foot (71 m) yacht North Star.

Duncan had specified to Seabury that Kanawha must be swift enough to beat the New Jersey Central Railroad passenger steamer Monmouth, which ran across New York Bay between New York and Atlantic Highlands, New Jersey. Kanawha's sea trials included an impromptu race against Monmouth on July 31, 1899. Kanawha won the race, despite one of her propellers being damaged, and Duncan accepted Kanawha from Seabury. He registered her at New York. Her US official number was 161123, and her code letters were KPDW.

== Private yacht ==
Duncan died on April 7, 1901. By 17 April Kanawha had been sold, and by 24 April Henry H Rogers was revealed to be the buyer. Rogers happened to be a major developer of coal and railroads in West Virginia along the Kanawha River. Under Rogers' ownership, Kanawha raced Sandy Hook, which was another of the New Jersey Central Railroad's steamers. On September 11, 1901, Sandy Hook beat Kanawha across New York Bay. The next day the two steamers raced again, and Kanawha won.

In March 1902, Rogers took guests including the humorist Mark Twain, essayist Laurence Hutton, and former Speaker of the United States House of Representatives Thomas B Reed aboard Kanawha on a visit to Santiago de Cuba and Newport News, Virginia. On another occasion, Rogers hosted the African American educator Booker T. Washington aboard Kanawha.

In July 1903 Kanawha took part in the NYYC's annual cruise to Newport, Rhode Island, where she won the annual Lysistrata Cup race. On August 25, 1903 she won a race across New York Bay against steam yachts including Chichota, Noma, and Zara. The NYYC chartered Kanawha's old adversary Monmouth to carry about 700 guests as spectators.

On June 18, 1904, Kanawha again won the Lysistrata Cup. This year the race was over a 60-mile course off the Sandy Hook Lightship, and competitors included the steam yacht Hauoli. The Navy had loaned the destroyer USS Truxtun to the Regatta Committee, and allegedly she was unable to keep up with Kanawha. The cup came with a $2,500 cash prize from James Gordon Bennett Jr., a former Commodore of the NYYC.

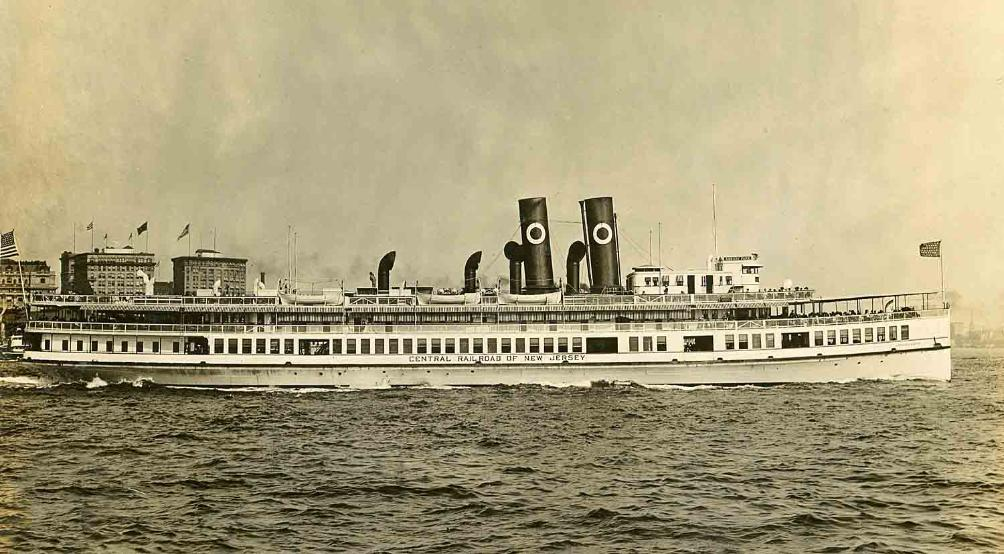
Asbury Park in 1910

In 1907 Twain was again Rogers' guest aboard Kanawha, this time to visit Norfolk, VA for the Jamestown Exposition. On July 9, she raced another New Jersey Central Railroad steamer, Asbury Park, across New York Bay. The New York Times reported that the race was so close that neither steamer could claim victory. In September 1907 Twain again on Kanawha from New York to Norfolk for a commemoration of Robert Fulton at the Jamestown Exposition. This time, Twain sailed as Kanawha's commander, rather than as a guest. Kanawha sailed in company with Vanderbilt's North Star.

Rogers died in 1909, and Kanawha passed through the hands of his executors. Her next owner was Abram Baudouine, one of the sons of Charles Baudouine. He spent about $100,000 on having her interior refitted. In May 1915 the financier Morton F Plant bought the yacht. By September or October 1915 John Borden had acquired her, and by 1916 he had registered her in Chicago.

== United States Navy ==
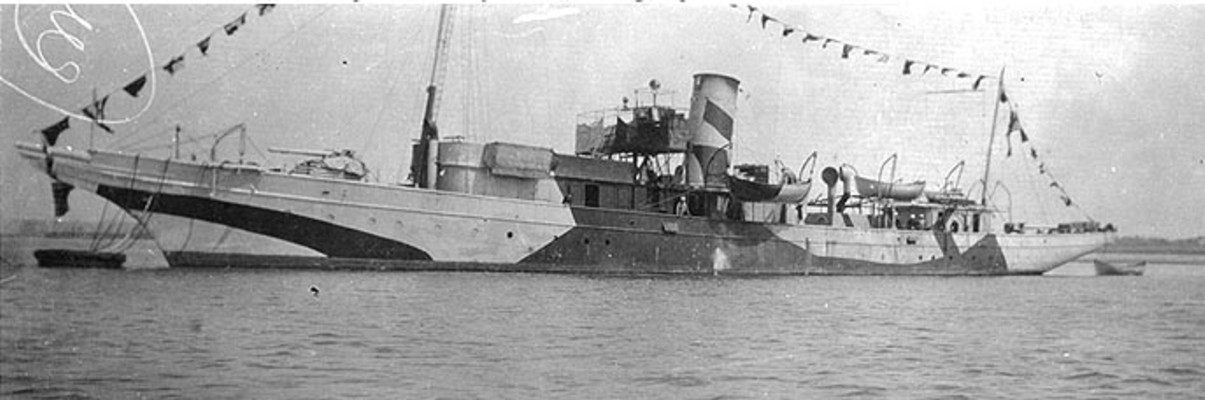
USS Piqua (SP-130) dressed overall on July 4, 1918, as flagship of the US District Commander at Lorient, France

In April 1917 the US Navy requisitioned Kanawha for conversion into a patrol vessel. On April 28 the Navy commissioned her as USS Kanawha II, with the "II" probably to reduce confusion with the oiler USS Kanawha (AO-1). She spent most of the war based at Brest, France, and operating in the Bay of Biscay. By 1918 she was equipped with wireless telegraphy. Her call sign was NND. On March 1, 1918 the Navy renamed her Piqua, perhaps because Kanawha II had not been enough to prevent confusing two US Navy ships of the same name. In 1919 she returned to New York, where she was decommissioned on July 1, 1919.

== Black Star Line ==
The yacht seems to have passed to the United States Shipping Board (USSB) rather than back to her owner, as in 1920 Marcus Garvey's Black Star Line was reported to have bought her from the USSB. Black Star is said to have renamed her Antonio Maceo, but this name may not have been registered, as news reports continued to call her Kanawha. By now she was no longer in good condition. On 26 August she left Norfolk, VA for Havana, Cuba on her first voyage for Black Star. She carried no passengers, but a crew of 39 and a cargo of onions. Three days later, one of her boilers exploded, killing one of her crew. The explosion left her adrift without power off Beaufort, North Carolina. She sent wireless distress signals; the cutters USRC Manning and Seminole were sent to rescue her; and she returned to Newport News "in distress" on September 1. Black Star ceased trading in February 1922.

== Bibliography ==
- Lloyd's Register of Yachts. London: Lloyd's Register of Shipping. 1900 – via Internet Archive.
- Lloyd's Register of Yachts. London: Lloyd's Register of Shipping. 1902 – via Internet Archive.
- Lloyd's Register of Yachts. London: Lloyd's Register of Shipping. 1905 – via Internet Archive.
- Lloyd's Register of Yachts. London: Lloyd's Register of Shipping. 1910 – via Internet Archive.
- Lloyd's Register of Yachts. London: Lloyd's Register of Shipping. 1911 – via Internet Archive.
- The Marconi Press Agency Ltd (1918). The Year Book of Wireless Telegraphy and Telephony. London: The Wireless Press, Ltd.
- United States Department of Commerce (1908). Thirty-Fifth Annual List of Merchant Vessels of the United States. Washington, DC: Government Printing Office – via Internet Archive.
- United States Department of Commerce (1916). Forty-Eighth Annual List of Merchant Vessels of the United States. Washington, DC: Government Printing Office – via HathiTrust.
