= NoMad, Manhattan =

Neighborhood in Manhattan, New York City

Coordinates: 40.7442°N 73.9883°W

NoMad

The apartment building at 1200 Broadway, once the Gilsey House Hotel (built 1869–1871), is an example of Second Empire Baroque architecture.

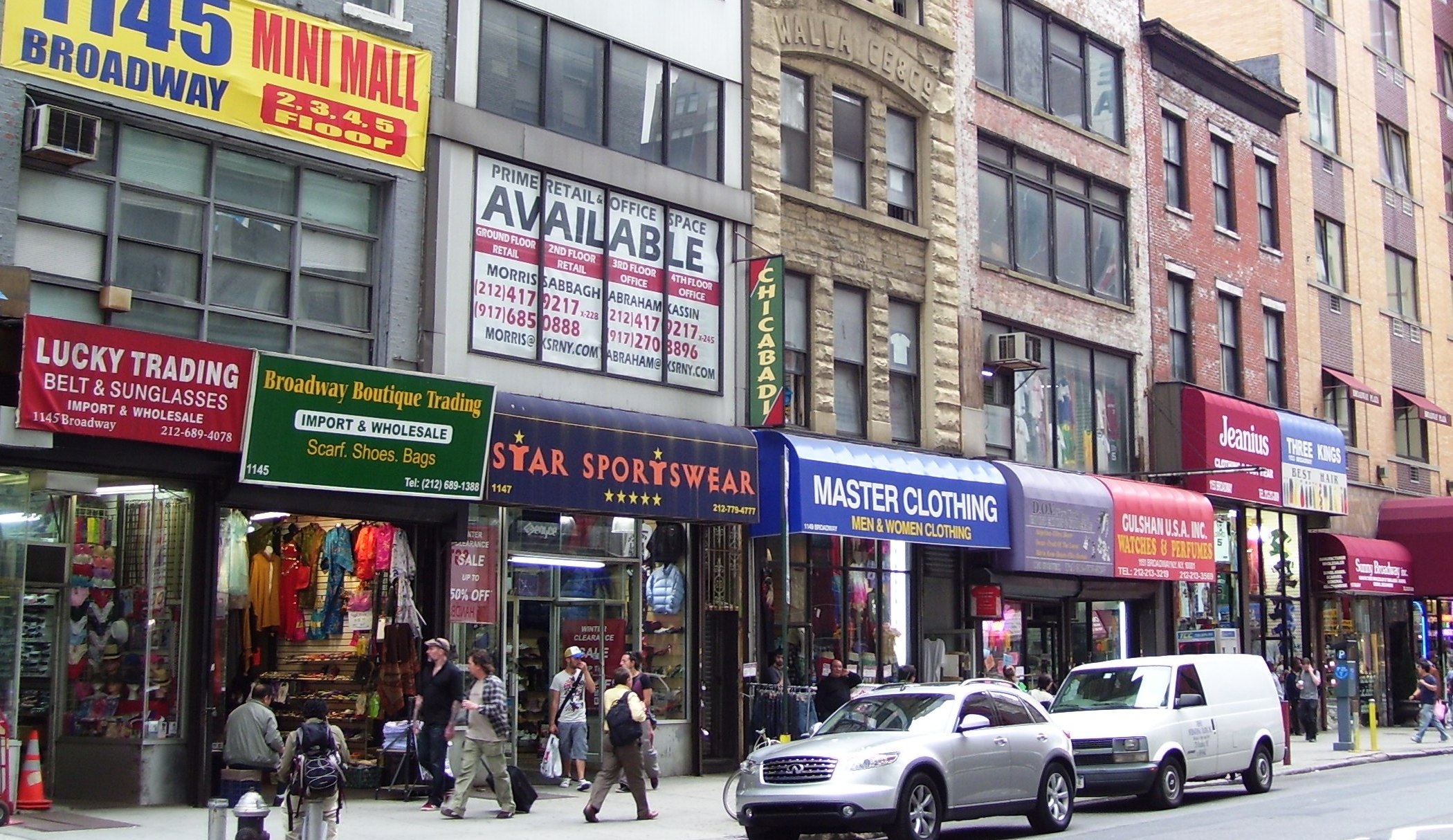
Parts of Broadway in NoMad, such as this block between 26th and 27th Streets, are full of small "wholesale" import shops.

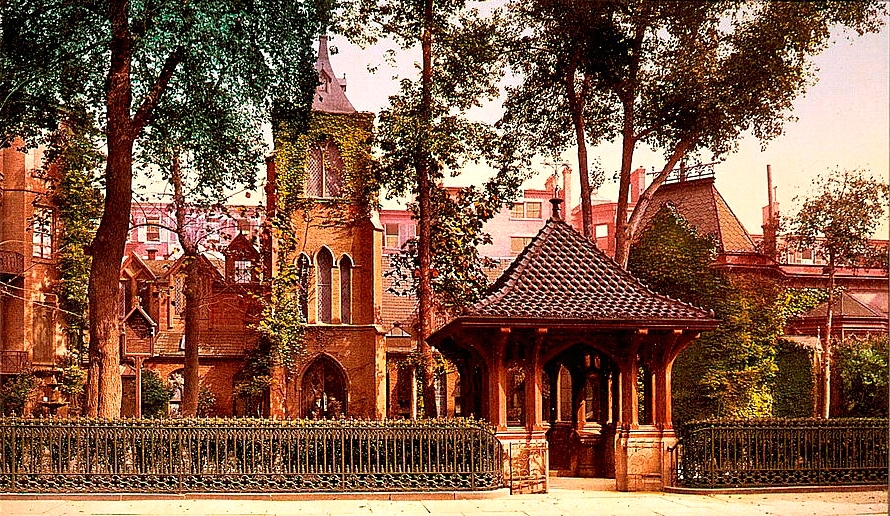
The Church of the Transfiguration (seen here in 1900) has been special to theater workers since 1870, when another church's pastor refused the funeral of actor George Holland and suggested it go to "the little church around the corner".

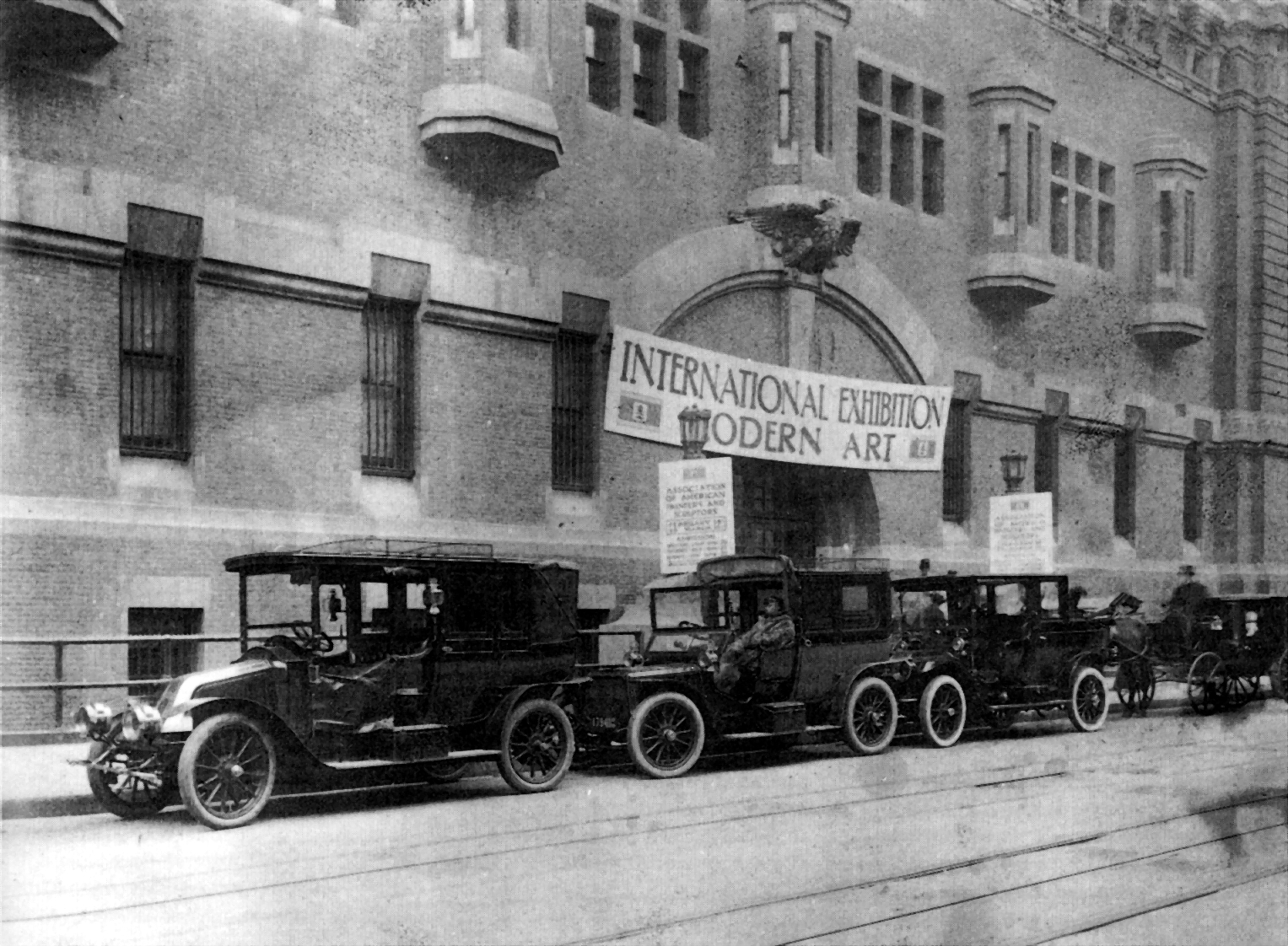
The Armory Show in 1913 was a seminal event in the history of modern art.

NoMad ("North of Madison Square"), also known as Madison Square North, is a neighborhood centered on the Madison Square North Historic District in the borough of Manhattan in New York City.

The name NoMad, which has been in use since 1999, is derived from the area's location north of Madison Square Park. The neighborhood is bordered by 25th Street to the south, 29th or 30th Streets to the north, Sixth Avenue (Avenue of the Americas) to the west and Madison or Lexington Avenue to the east. (Note: Neighborhoods in New York City do not have official status, and their boundaries are not specifically set by the city. There are a number of Community Boards, whose boundaries are officially set, but these are fairly large and generally contain a number of neighborhoods. The neighborhoods map issued by the Department of City Planning only shows the largest and most established neighborhoods. Thus, common usage is the only way to determine the boundaries of a neighborhood, which leads to variations, especially for relatively new neighborhoods such as NoMad. For instance, an article in the Wall Street Journal reported that a building at 1250 Broadway, between East 31st and 32nd Streets, "on the edge of Manhattan's NoMad neighborhood", was being renamed the "Nomad Tower", implying that the northern boundary of the neighborhood might be moving uptown past 29th or 30th Streets. In an example of how impressions of the neighbood's location can differ greatly, Sanna Feirstein, in her book Naming New York, includes a map which defines NoMad as lying between Park and Sixth Avenues from East 23rd to 34th Street, and then continuing further north to East 42nd Street, between Madison Avenue and Broadway, a northern extension for the neighborhood reported by no other source.) The surrounding neighborhoods are Chelsea to the west, Midtown South to the northwest, Murray Hill to the northeast, Rose Hill to the east, and the Flatiron District to the south. NoMad is part of Manhattan Community District 5.

== History ==
NoMad's early history is closely aligned with that of Madison Square Park, which has been a public space since 1686. The park extends from Fifth Avenue to Madison Avenue between 23rd and 26th Streets. Formerly a military parade ground that to this day serves as the starting point for the city's annual Veterans Day Parade, Madison Square Park and the surrounding area have undergone a number of changes since pre-Revolutionary War days, serving at various times as a potter’s field, an army arsenal and a facility for juvenile delinquents.

New Yorkers began establishing residences around the park in the mid-nineteenth century. Private brownstone dwellings and mansions springing up around the perimeter of the park soon boasted such respected, well-to-do families as the Haights, Stokeses, Scheifflins, Wolfes, and Barlows. Leonard and Clara Jerome, the grandparents of Winston Churchill, lived at 41 East 26th Street. The Jerome Mansion later became the clubhouse of the Union League Club of New York (its second location), the University Club and, finally, the Manhattan Club, birthplace of the Manhattan cocktail and congregating place of such famous Democrats as Franklin D. Roosevelt, Grover Cleveland and Al Smith. The mansion was demolished in 1967 and was replaced in 1974 by the New York Merchandise Mart, which also extends onto the site of the adjacent Madison Square Hotel, where actors Henry Fonda and James Stewart roomed in the 1930s.

The famous families in the area nurtured the spiritual life of the neighborhood, founding such landmark houses of worship as the Church of the Transfiguration (the "Little Church Around the Corner"), Trinity Chapel (site of the wedding between writer Edith Newbold Jones and Edward Wharton and now the home of the Serbian Orthodox Cathedral of Saint Sava) and Marble Collegiate Church.

The area became a meeting place for the Gilded Age elite, and a late-nineteenth century mecca for shoppers, tourists and after-theater restaurant patrons. A list of celebrities who ate at Delmonico's is a who’s who of the day, including Diamond Jim Brady, Mark Twain, Jenny Lind, Lillian Russell, Charles Dickens, Oscar Wilde, J.P. Morgan, James Gordon Bennett, Jr., Walter Scott, Edward VII of the United Kingdom (then the Prince of Wales), and Napoleon III of France.

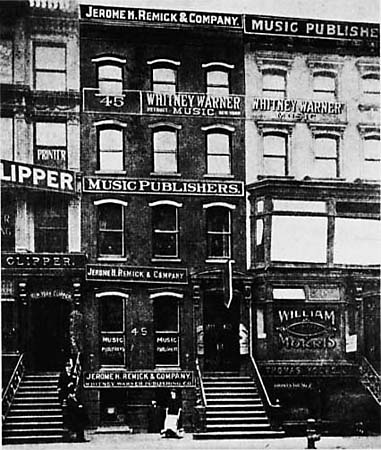
Tin Pan Alley on West 28th Street

A commercial boom followed with the growth of hotels, restaurants, entertainment venues and office buildings, many of which are still standing. By the late nineteenth century, business activity began to eclipse the residential scene around the park, and the area along Broadway above the park began to be subsumed into the Tenderloin, an entertainment-and-vice red-light district full of nightclubs, saloons, bordellos, gambling casinos, dance halls and "clip joints". At about this time, on August 14, 1894, the world's first kinetoscope parlor opened in a former shoe store at 1155 Broadway, on the corner of 27th Street. For 25 cents, patrons could stand and watch a short film through a shaded "peephole" on William Dickson's device. The store had 10 of these machines, and netted $120 for its opening day.

In the late nineteenth and early twentieth century the area around 28th Street between Fifth Avenue and the Avenue of the Americas (Sixth Avenue) was dubbed Tin Pan Alley thanks to the collection of music publishers and songwriters there who dominated the American commercial music world of the time. Around the same time, the 1913 Armory Show, which took place at the 69th Regiment Armory on Lexington Avenue between 25th and 26th Streets, was a seminal event in the history of Modern Art.

The neighborhood deteriorated somewhat during the mid- and late-twentieth century. Tee-shirt, luggage, perfume and jewelry wholesalers began lining the storefronts along Broadway from Madison Square to Herald Square, and wholesalers continue to dominate that stretch. By the second half of the twentieth century, Madison Square Park was suffering from neglect and petty crime. The massive 2001 park restoration project, spearheaded by the Madison Square Park Conservancy spurred a transformation of the neighborhoods around the park—the Flatiron District, Rose Hill and NoMad—from primarily commercial to places attractive for residences, upscale businesses and trendy restaurants and nightspots, especially in the early 2010s.

== Notable people ==
The Trial of the Century

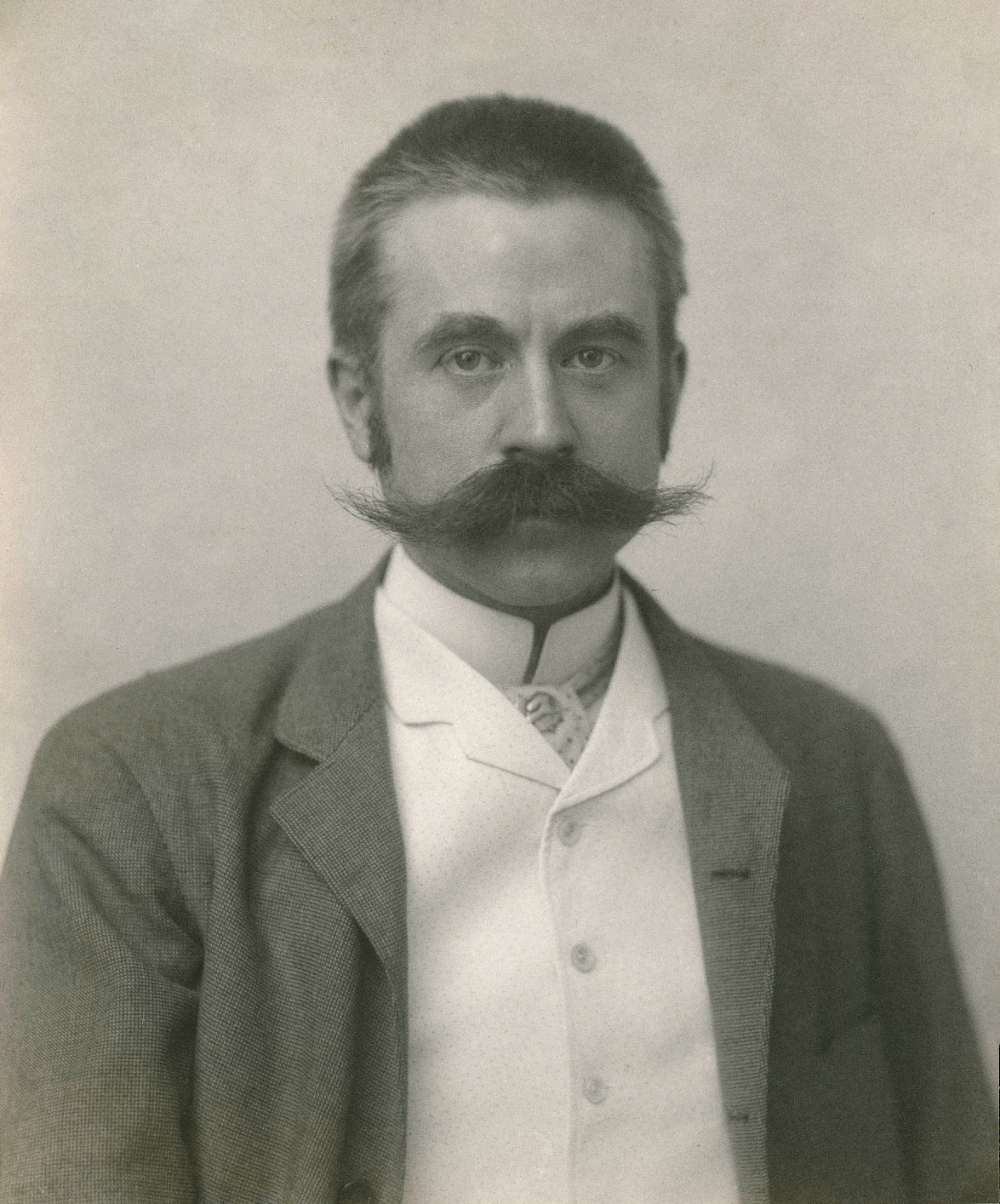
Stanford White

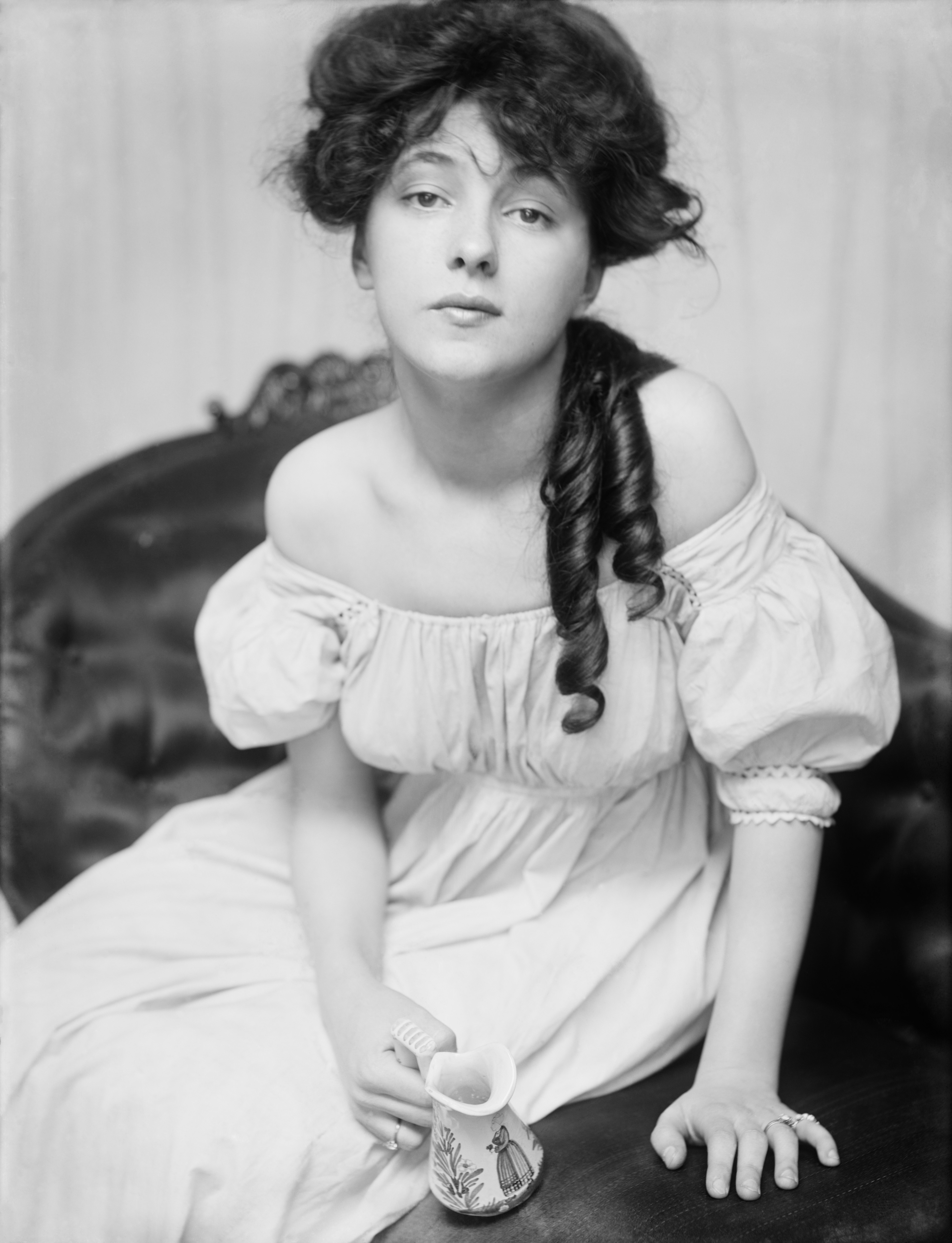
Evelyn Nesbit

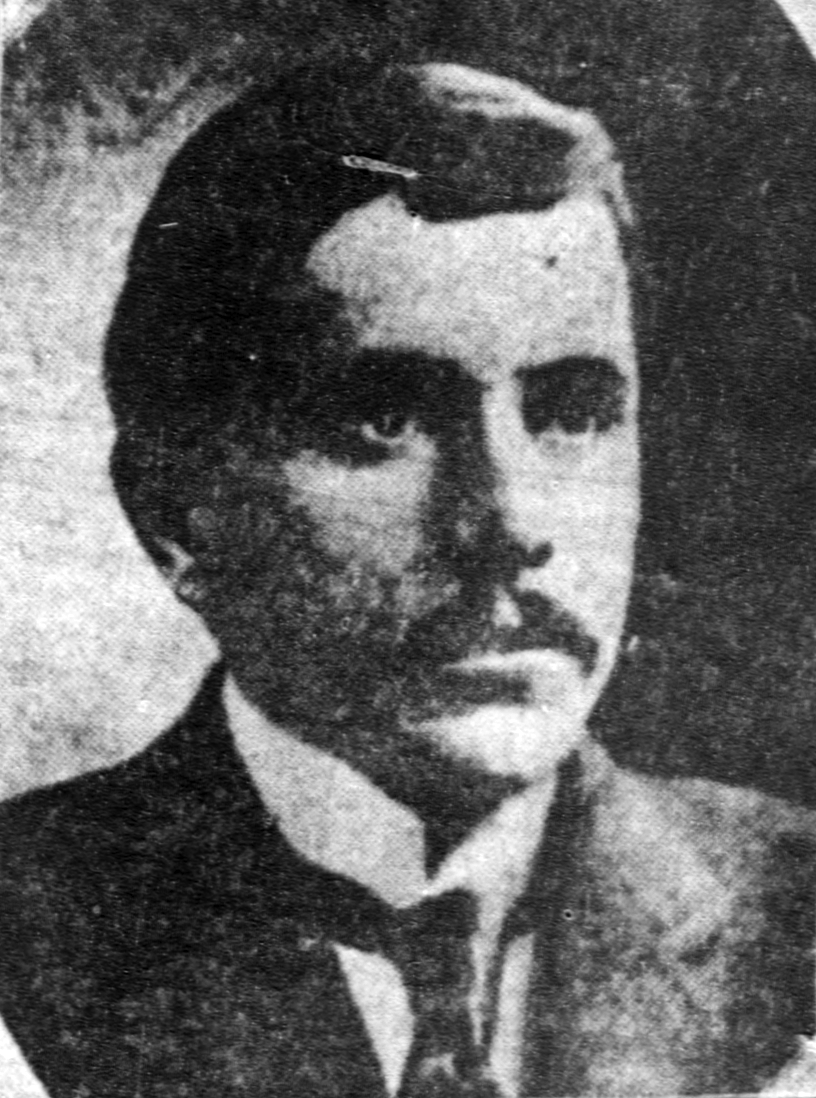
Harry Thaw

- Buried under Worth Square at the intersection of Broadway, Fifth Avenue, and West 24th and 25th Streets is Mexican War hero Major General William Jenkins Worth, for whom Fort Worth, the city in Texas, was named.
- Roscoe Conkling, whose statue stands at the southeast corner of Madison Square Park, was a kingmaker in the Republican Party in the last half of the nineteenth century and is closely associated with the Fifth Avenue Hotel and political scandals during the James A. Garfield and Chester Alan Arthur administrations.
- Stanford White, partner in the respected architectural firm of McKim, Mead and White, designed the magnificent Madison Square Garden, which stood from 1890 to 1925 between 26th and 27th Streets at Madison Avenue on the northeast corner of Madison Square Park. Featuring the largest amphitheater in the US, the building’s tower contained White’s apartment and love nest topped by a scantily draped statue of Diana. There, he entertained Evelyn Nesbit Thaw, one of the Garden’s rooftop Florodora Girls. In a jealous rage, her husband, Harry Thaw, fatally shot White in the middle of a musical production on the roof. Six years into the twentieth century, the media was touting the trial of the murderer of Stanford White, one of the country’s most prolific architects and womanizers, as "The Trial of the Century."
- Nikola Tesla, the Serbian-American electrical engineer and inventor, moved into what was then the Gerlach Hotel at 49-55 West 27th Street between Broadway and Sixth Avenue in 1892. Tesla disliked the Gerlach and would move to the Waldorf–Astoria in 1899. The Yugoslav-American Bicentennial Committee added a plaque to the building in 1977 commemorating Tesla's stay there. The building is sometimes called the "Radio Wave" or "Radiowave" building.
- Chelsea Clinton, the daughter of U.S. President Bill Clinton and Secretary of State Hillary Clinton, as well as her husband Marc Mezvinsky and their children, lived in NoMad for 18 months in 2014–2016 before moving to another apartment building within the Flatiron District.
- Dave Portnoy, founder of Barstool Sports sports blog and conglomerate, original Barstool office was founded in the area, and is still run out of the same office to this day. Home office of Pardon My Take and many other popular web blogs and podcasts.

== Buildings ==
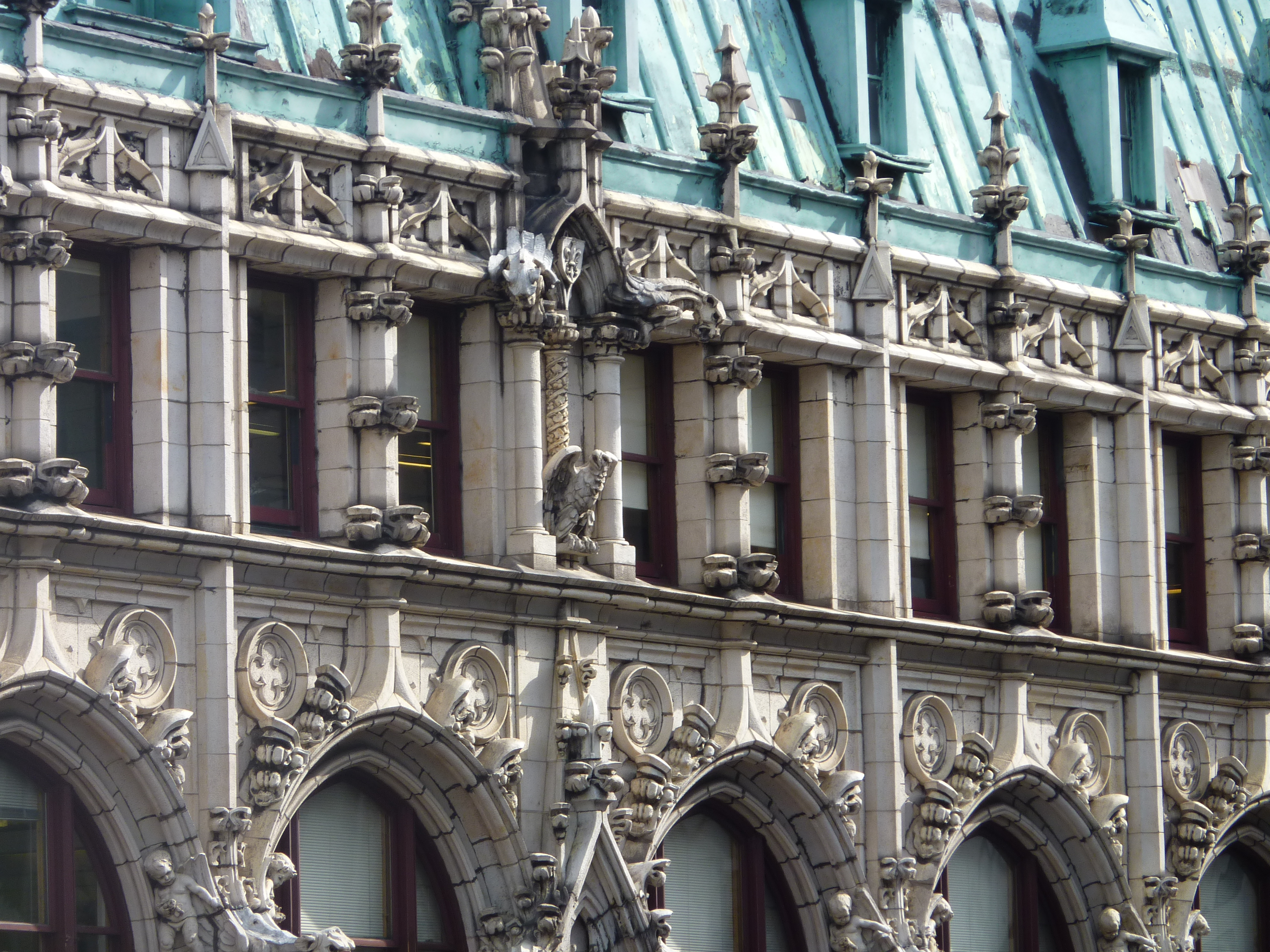
French Renaissance revival architectural detail of a building in NoMad

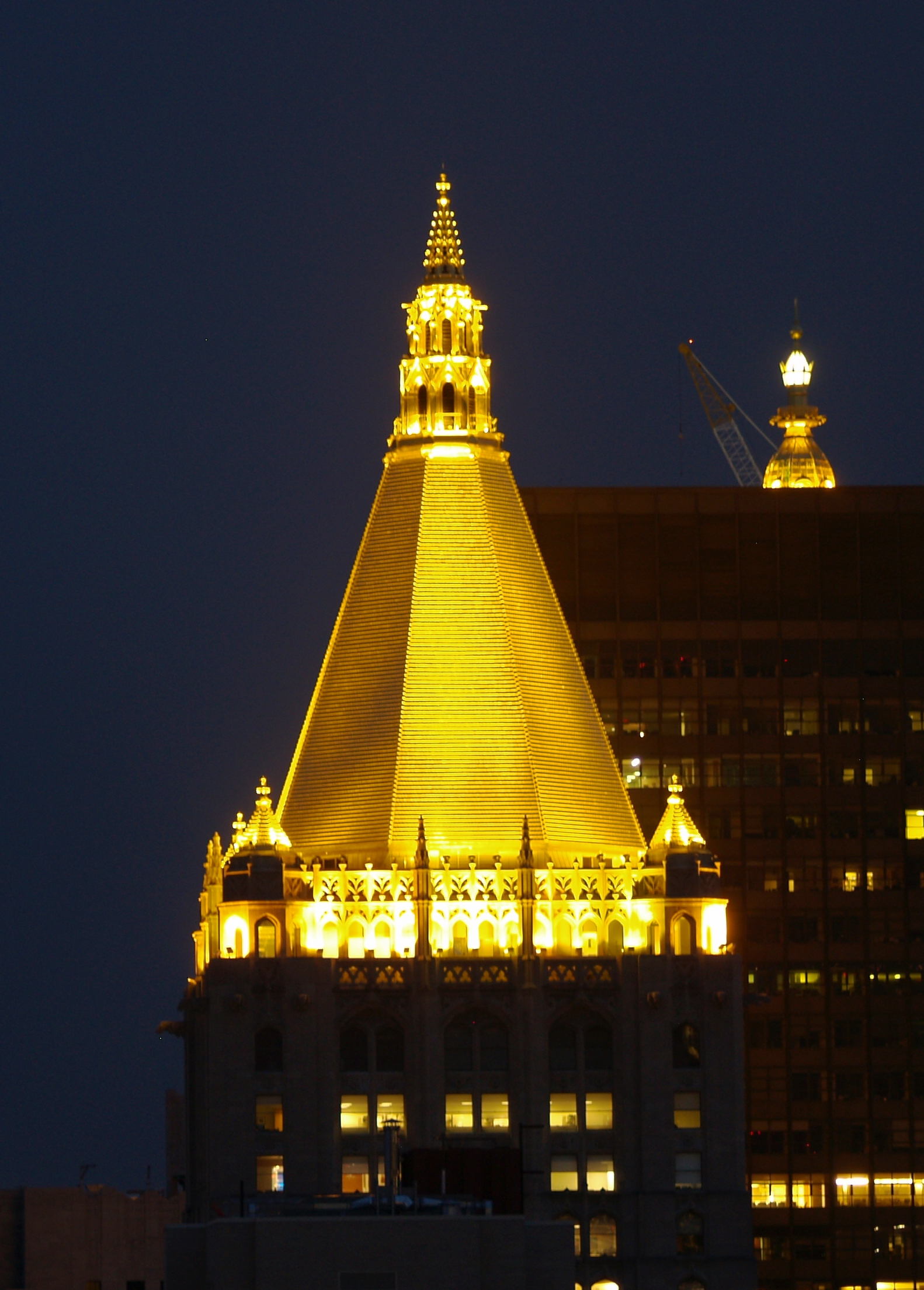
The top of the New York Life Building at night

Among the notable buildings in the area are New York Life Building, the headquarters of the New York Life Insurance Company; the Gift Building, which has been converted to a luxury condominium; and the Toy Center, which has been converted to an office complex.

Designed in 1904 by Stanford White as the prestigious Colony Club for socialites, the building at 120 Madison Avenue has been occupied since 1963 by the American Academy of Dramatic Arts. Long before the Academy began training its young hopefuls in the NoMad area, the Madison Square Theater opened in 1880. Boasting the first electric footlights and a backstage double-decker elevator, the theater also provided an early air-conditioning system.

Along Broadway, the Townsend (1896) and St. James (1896) were the tallest buildings in New York for a short while, and remain historic landmarks. Slightly up the street, the Baudouine Building at 28th Street was heavily decorated with escutcheons of anthemions with lion heads over many windows. At the same corner, the Johnston Building (now the Hotel NoMad) was built in 1900 and faced in all limestone with beautiful exterior decoration. One block up, Jacqueline Kennedy Onassis’s grandfather built a classically designed loft building, next to the Breslin.

Although a number of old buildings in the neighborhood have been renovated, there have been few new construction starts in the area. One of the first is 241 Fifth Avenue between 27th and 28th Streets. Construction began on the 46-unit condominium building in November 2011, and it was open to sales in April 2013; by April of the next year it was sold out. Elsewhere in the neighborhood, old building are undergoing conversion to residences.

In 2014, the Kaufman Organization announced it was developing four underutilized NoMad commercial buildings previously owned by F. M. Ring Associates: 119 West 24th Street near Sixth Avenue, 19 West 24th Street near Fifth Avenue, 45 West 27th Street, and 13 West 27th Street. The buildings will be renovated to make them more attractive to technology firms, and the street level spaces made suitable for use by retail outlets and restaurants.

=== Hotels past and present ===
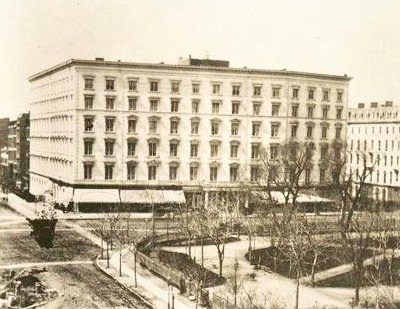
The Fifth Avenue Hotel in 1860

NoMad was once home to some of New York’s most luxurious hotels. Completed in 1859 by Amos R. Eno, the Fifth Avenue Hotel, whose gleaming white-marble housed 100 apartment suites, was the first American hotel with an elevator and private bathrooms, as well as a fourth meal, or "late supper", and was a popular meeting place for politicians, brokers and speculators. Because of its opulence, as well as its location at the far uptown edge of the city, it was dubbed "Eno's Folly". The site previously had been an inn where travelers leaving the city or returning to it could get a meal or lodging before continuing their trip. The hotel stood between West 23rd and 24th Streets facing Madison Square, where the Toy Center South would later stand.

By the 1870s, numerous hotels catering to much the same clientele had opened in the area, including the Hoffman House (24th Street), the Victoria (27th Street), the Gilsey House (29th Street) and the Grand (31st Street)—both still standing as of the 21st century, converted to residential use—and the Brunswick.

The Brunswick, at 26th Street and Fifth Avenue, was the hotel favored by the horsey set. The male-only New York Coaching Club, established in 1875 by Col. Delancey Astor Kane and William Jay, was headquartered there, and elevated "four-in-hand" carriage riding to an art form. Holding the reins of all four horses in one fist, the drivers ("whips") guided their horses from the Brunswick to the carriage drives in Central Park and staged parades twice a year.

The St. James Hotel at Broadway and 26th Street, where the St. James Building would later stand, was built in 1874. With its 30 parlors, bar, cigar stand, barber shop, dining room and full-service amenities, the hotel served the needs of mid- to late-nineteenth-century business and upscale clientele. The hotel was the site of a Confederate arson attack during the American Civil War. It was the first of 20 buildings to go up in flames in a coordinated effort by Confederate forces on November 25, 1864.

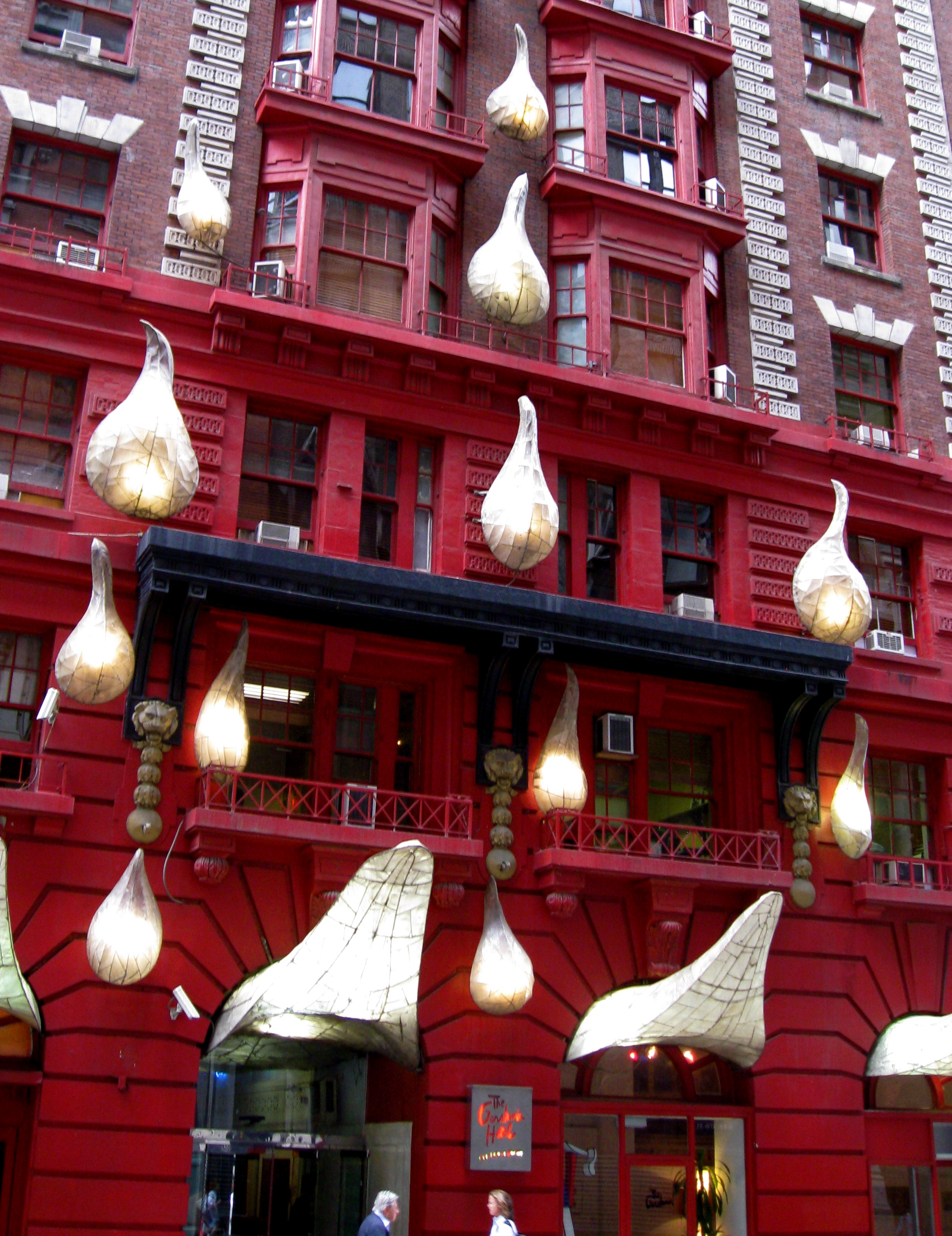
The exterior of the Gershwin Hotel

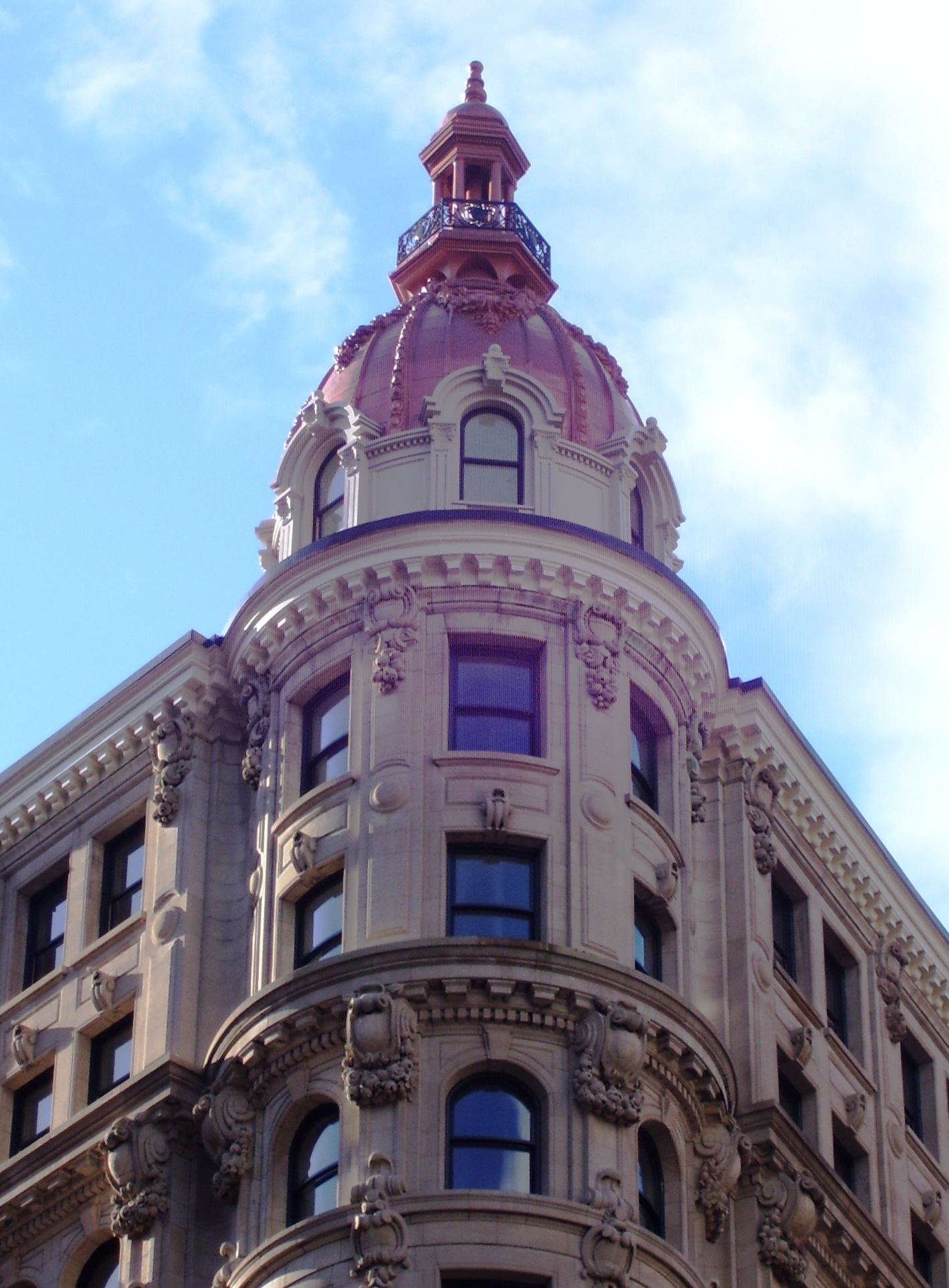
The Johnston Building was renovated into the NoMad Hotel, which opened in 2012.

Known since 1987 as the Carlton, the Hotel Seville, named for the original investor Maitland E. Graves’ infatuation with the Spanish city, was designed by Harry Allen Jacobs, and opened its doors on East 29th Street and Madison Avenue in 1904, months before the unveiling of the city’s first subway. Renovated and transformed at a cost of $60 million more than a century later by David Rockwell, the hotel’s "Tiffany-style glass skylight" on the mezzanine was discovered under layers of paint “used to deter air raids during World War II.”

The Breslin Hotel, built in 1904, was transformed in 2009 into the Ace Hotel, but not before passing through a period as a single room occupancy (SRO) apartment building, during the low point of the neighborhood. The Ace, which was redesigned by Roman & Williams is a 300-room hotel whose restaurant has attracted a trendy crowd. The NoMad Hotel at 28th Street and Broadway occupies the Johnston Building, a landmark 1900 French Renaissance limestone space which features a Beaux-Arts cupola. The Gershwin Hotel, on East 27th Street, and named after George Gershwin, has a unique facade, a combination of red paint and whimsical decorative touches.

Gansevoort Park, the second location of Hotel Gansevoort in New York, opened in 2010 at Park Avenue and 29th Street, complete with a "glass column containing light-emitting diodes" that changes color. Rounding out the host of boutique hotels in and around NoMad is the King and Grove Hotel, occupying the former space of the historic Martha Washington Hotel, located at 30 East 30 Street.

== Culture ==
=== Restaurants ===
The neighborhood was once the home of Delmonico's, New York elite society's favorite restaurant and the birthplace of Lobster Newburg. Today it has a numerous restaurants serving a wide range of cuisines, including San Rocco, Hill Country Barbecue, Bamiyan Afghan Restaurant, Antique Cafe, SD26, A Voce, Country, Ben & Jack’s Steakhouse and Illi. Eataly, a 44,000-square-foot (4,100 m^{2}) Italian food market comprising Italian restaurants, cafes and wine and food shops opened in Summer 2010.

=== Cultural attractions, art and nightlife ===
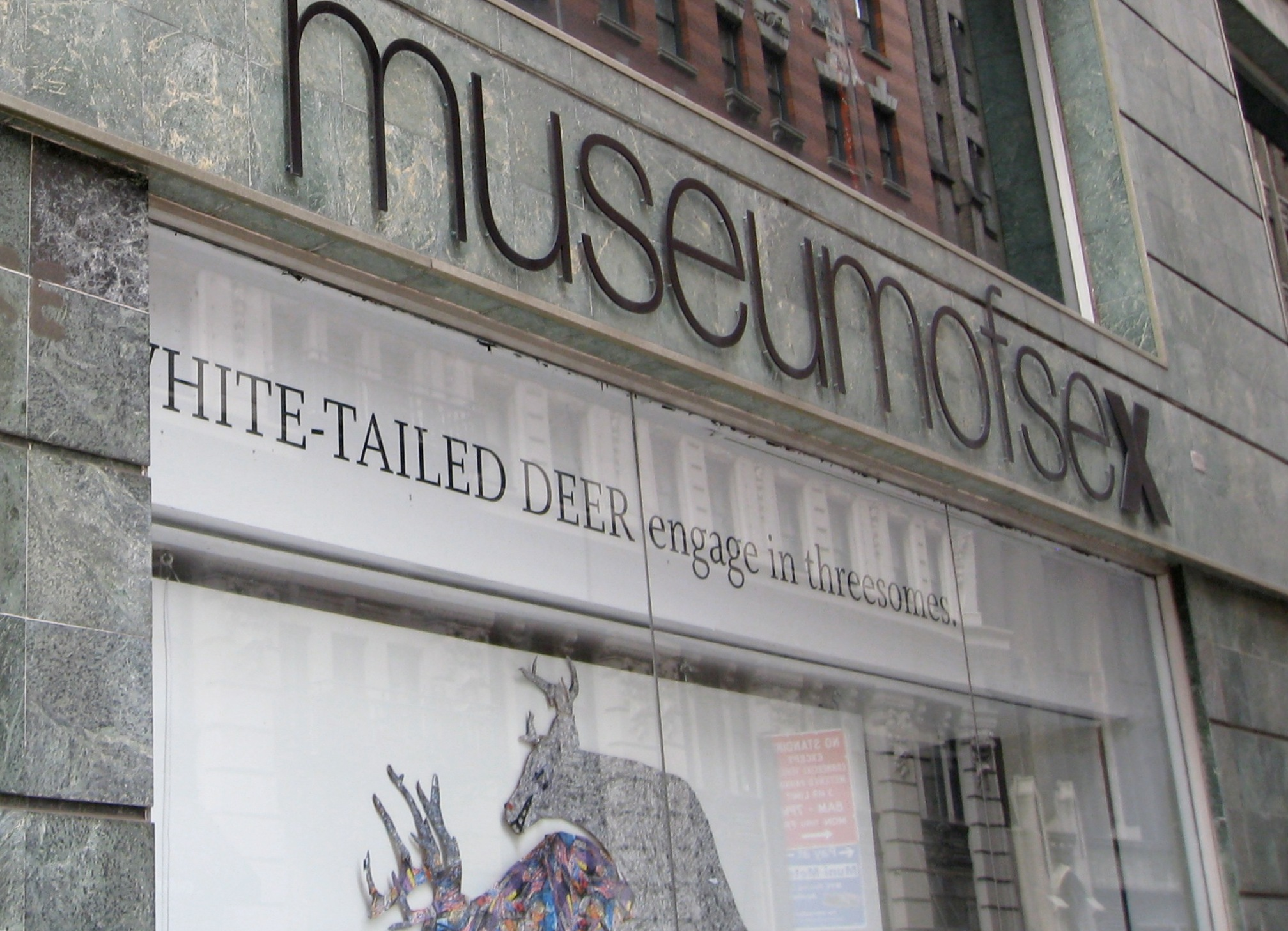
The Museum of Sex on Fifth Avenue, which opened in 2002

NoMad is home to the Museum of Sex, the New York Comedy Club and Tada! Youth Theater, and is also a center for antique galleries and one of the city’s largest collections of weekend flea markets. Nightspots and clubs include the Breslin Lobby Bar, Jay-Z’s 40/40, the rooftop bar at 230 Fifth Avenue, Gstaad, Hillstone’s, and the Park Avenue Country Club. The noted Rizzoli Bookstore announced in September 2014 it will be reopening its New York City flagship in NoMad. The NoMad Piazza, a pedestrian venue on Broadway between 25th and 31st, was established as part of the NYC Open Streets program to allow restaurants to continue their outdoor seating areas and to allow for an open-air, foot traffic area within NoMad.

== Transportation ==
NoMad is served by four New York City Subway stations. The 23rd Street and 28th Street stations on the BMT Broadway Line offer service on the N, Q, R, and W trains at Broadway. The 23rd Street–Baruch College and 28th Street stations of the IRT Lexington Avenue Line are both located on Park Avenue South, offering service on the 6 and <6> trains.

The area is served by New York City Bus routes M1, M2 and M3 on Park and Madison Avenues (northbound) and Fifth Avenues (southbound). M55 service also runs southbound on Fifth Avenue, while northbound M55 and M7 service runs on nearby Sixth Avenue. The M101, M102, M103 routes run on Third and Lexington Avenues, northbound and southbound, respectively. There is also M23 SBS crosstown bus service on 23rd Street.

== Education ==
Public schools in the area include Baruch College Campus High School, a collaboration between the New York City Department of Education and the City University of New York's Baruch College.

Private schools in the area include the Aaron School High School and the Rebecca School, both special education schools; the Fusion Academy, and the Drake Bennett School.

The preschool of École Internationale de New York is located in NoMad at 206 Fifth Avenue between West 25th and 26th Streets, where the school has 15,000 square feet (1,400 m^{2}) with a 33-year lease.

Post-secondary schools include the New York School of Interior Design as well as part of the Baruch College campus.

== Gallery ==
Around NoMad

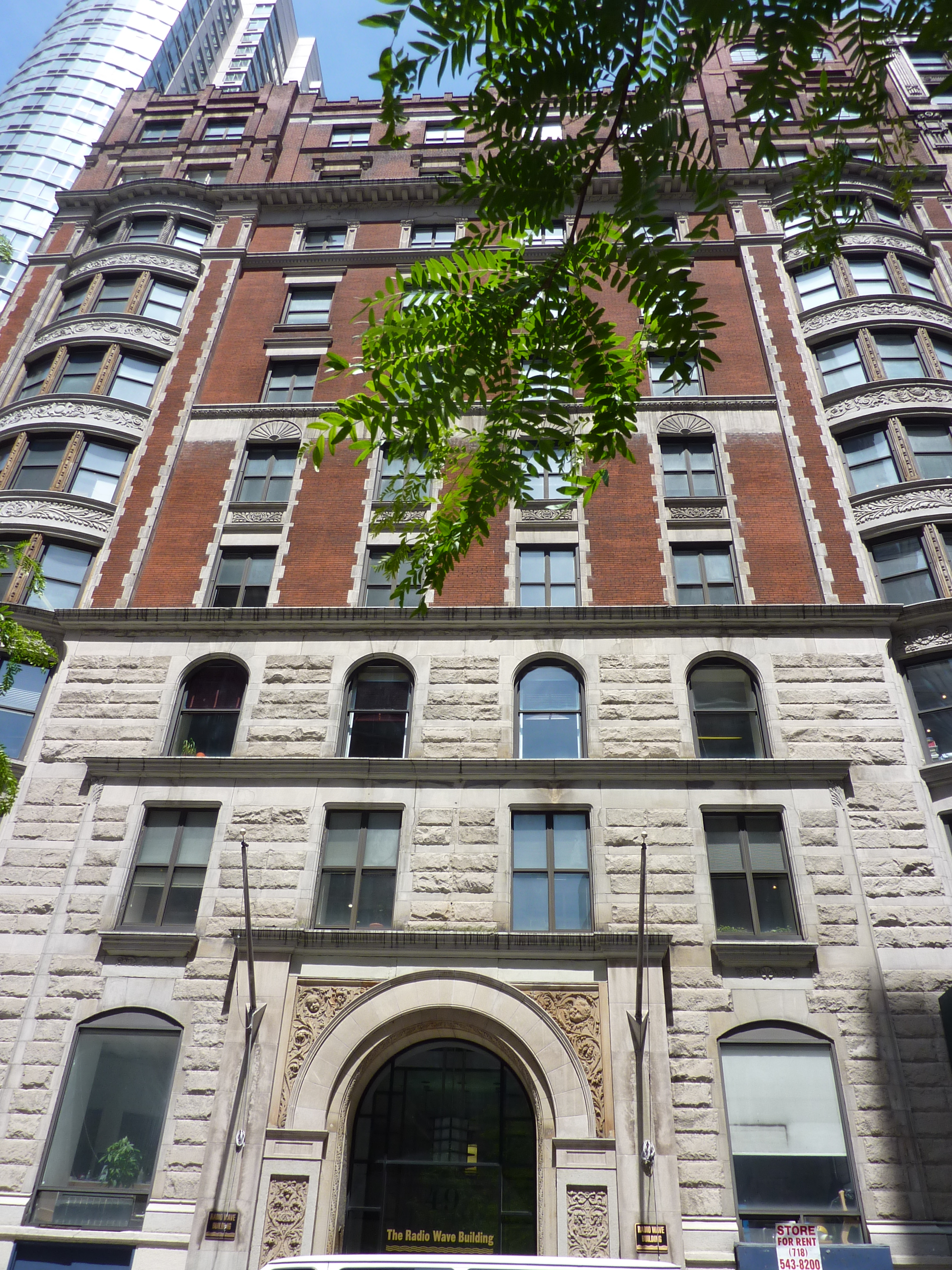
The Radio Wave Building, formerly the Gerlach Hotel, where noted inventor Nikola Tesla lived

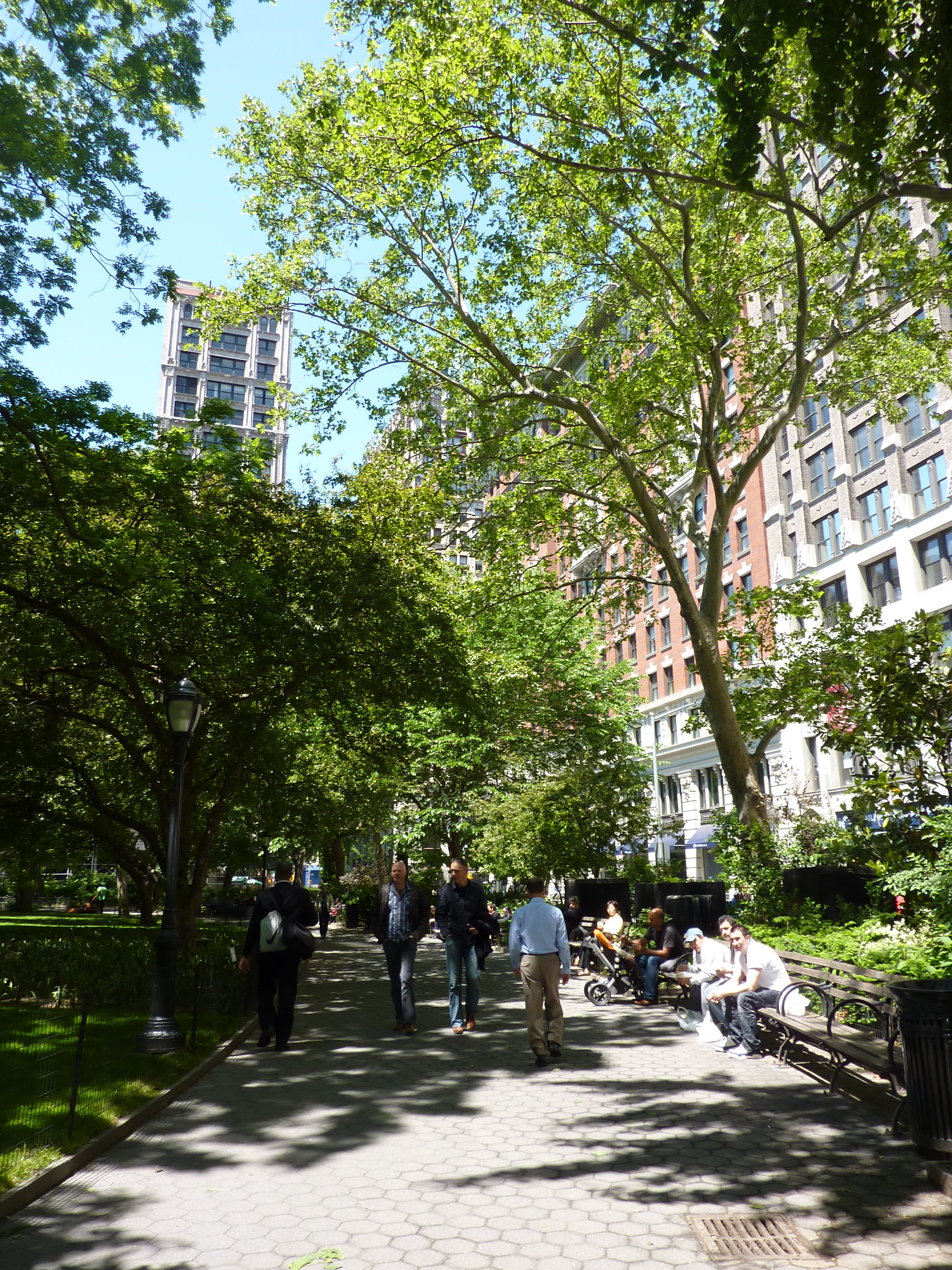
Madison Square Park, opened in 1847, was extensively renovated in 2001

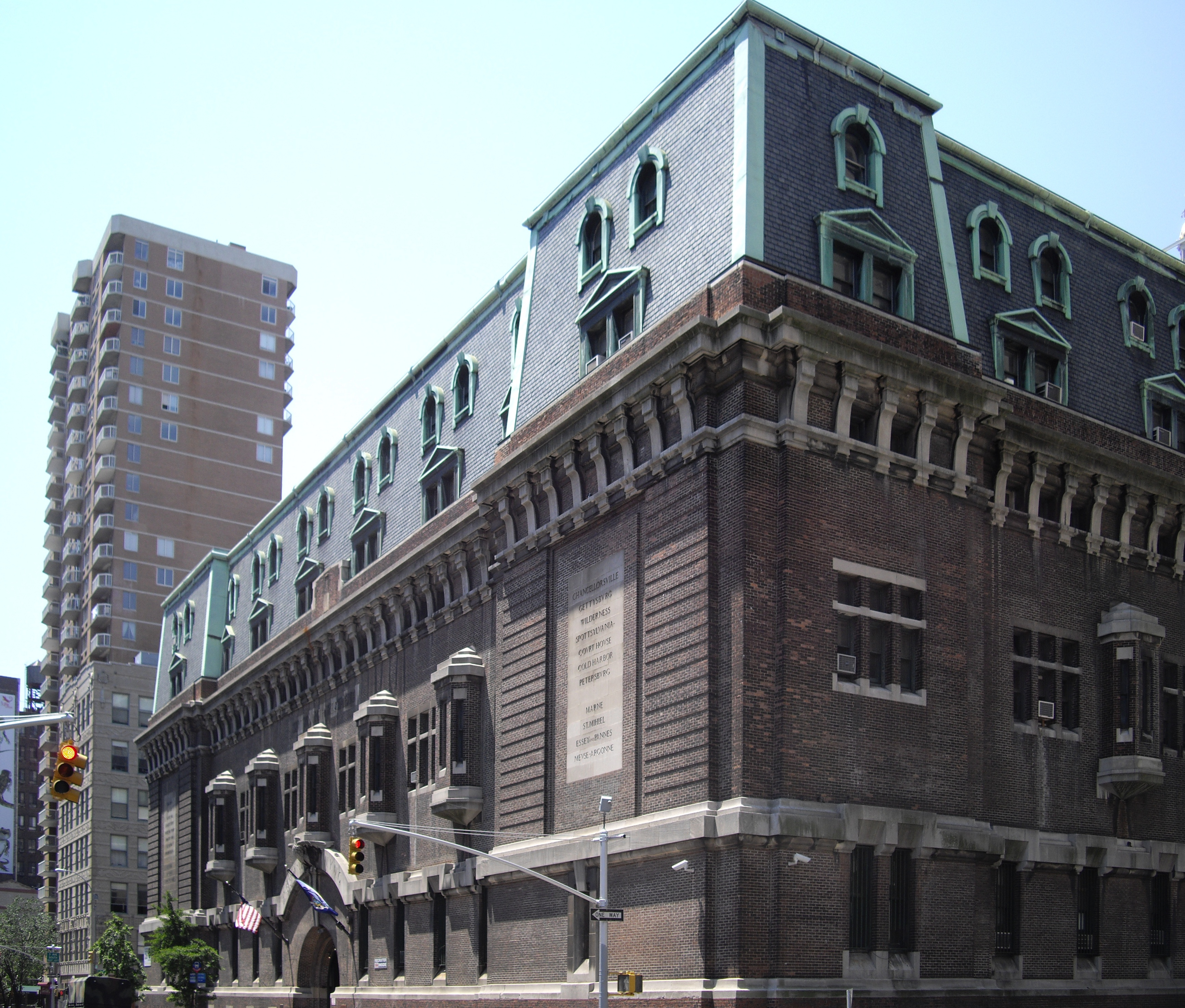
The 69th Regiment Armory, completed in 1906, is a National Historic Landmark

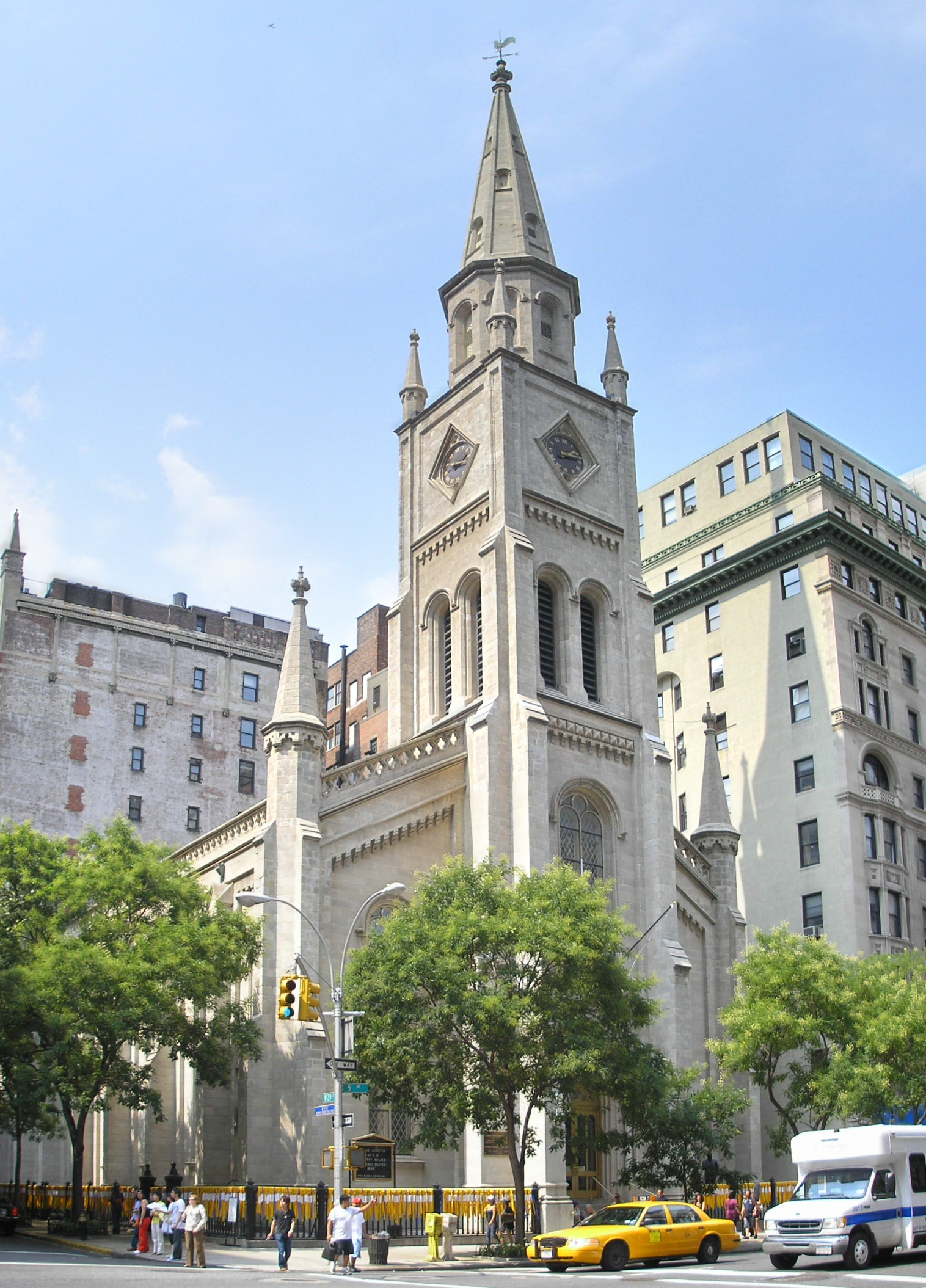
Marble Collegiate Church (1851–1854); for many years Norman Vincent Peale was its pastor
