= Baudouine Building =

Building in Manhattan, New York

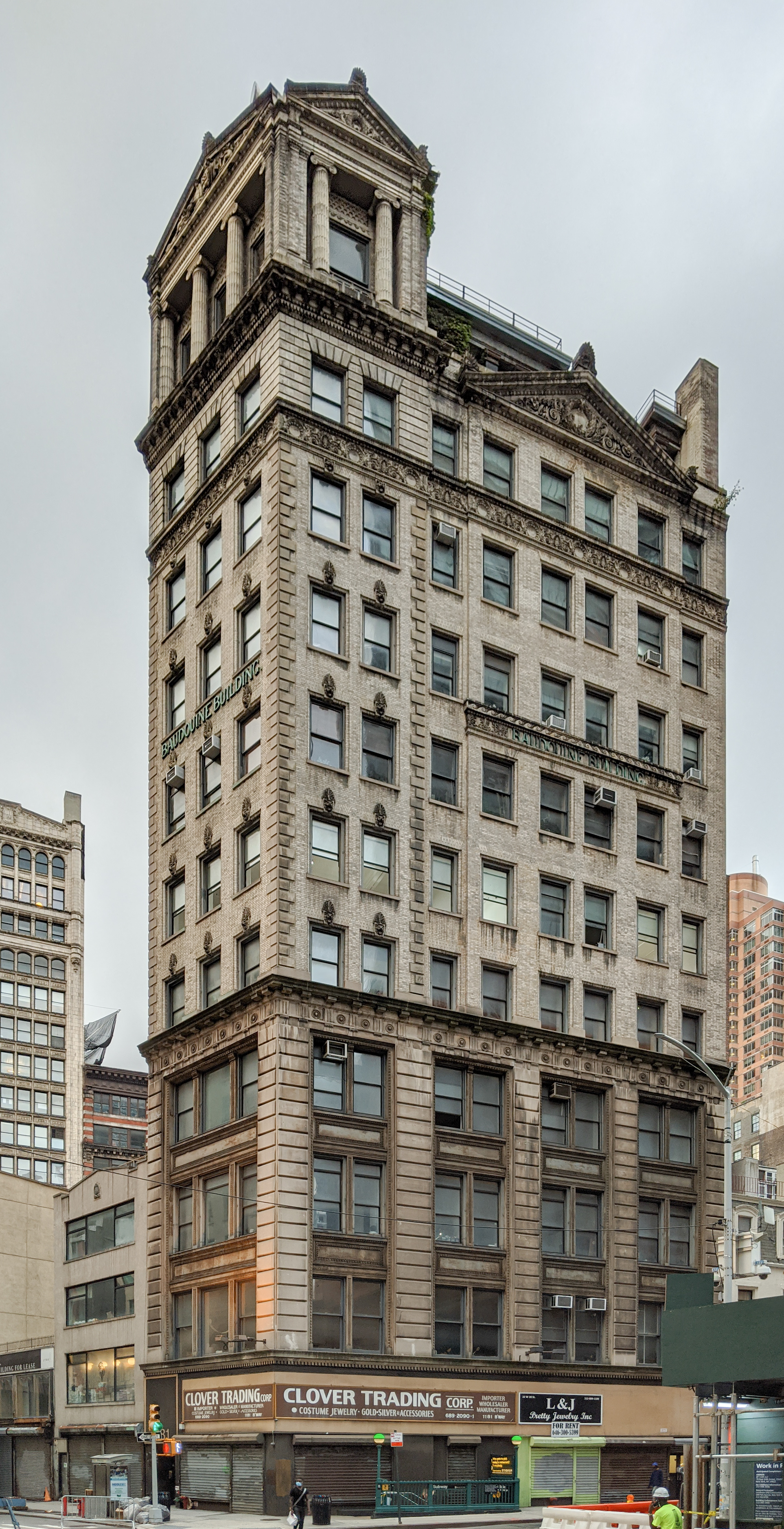
- Interactive map of the Baudouine Building area

General information
- Architectural style: Classical Revival
- Location: 1181–1183 Broadway; Manhattan, New York City, New York
- Coordinates: 40°44′43″N 73°59′20″W
- Completed: 1895

Height
- Height: 154 feet (47 m)

Technical details
- Floor count: 11

Design and construction
- Architect: Alfred Zucker

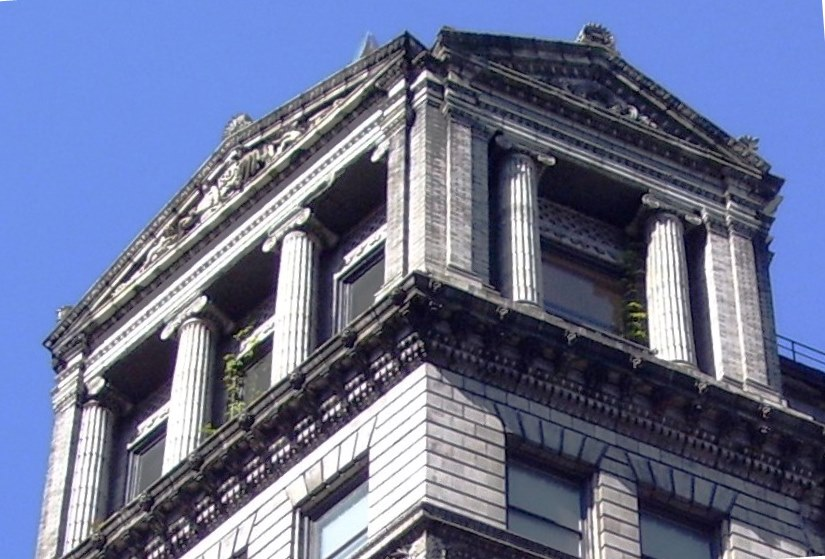
The "Little Parmassus in the sky" at the top of the building

The Baudouine Building is a historic building at 1181–1183 Broadway at the corner of West 28th Street in the NoMad neighborhood of Manhattan in New York City. It was built from 1895 to 1896 as an office tower with street level store, replacing a hotel that had previously stood on the site, and was designed by Alfred Zucker in the Classical Revival style.

The building is notable for having a small Greco-Roman temple at the top, called "a little Parnassus in the sky" by chairwoman Sherida E. Paulsen of the New York City Landmarks Preservation Commission It has extensive decorative motifs including escutcheons of anthemions with lion heads over many windows.

The Baudouine Building, which also carries the address 22 West 28th Street, lies within the Madison Square North Historic District created by the Commission in 2001.

== See also ==
- Charles Baudouine
- NoMad, Manhattan
