= Charles Baudouine =

American cabinetmaker and interior decorator

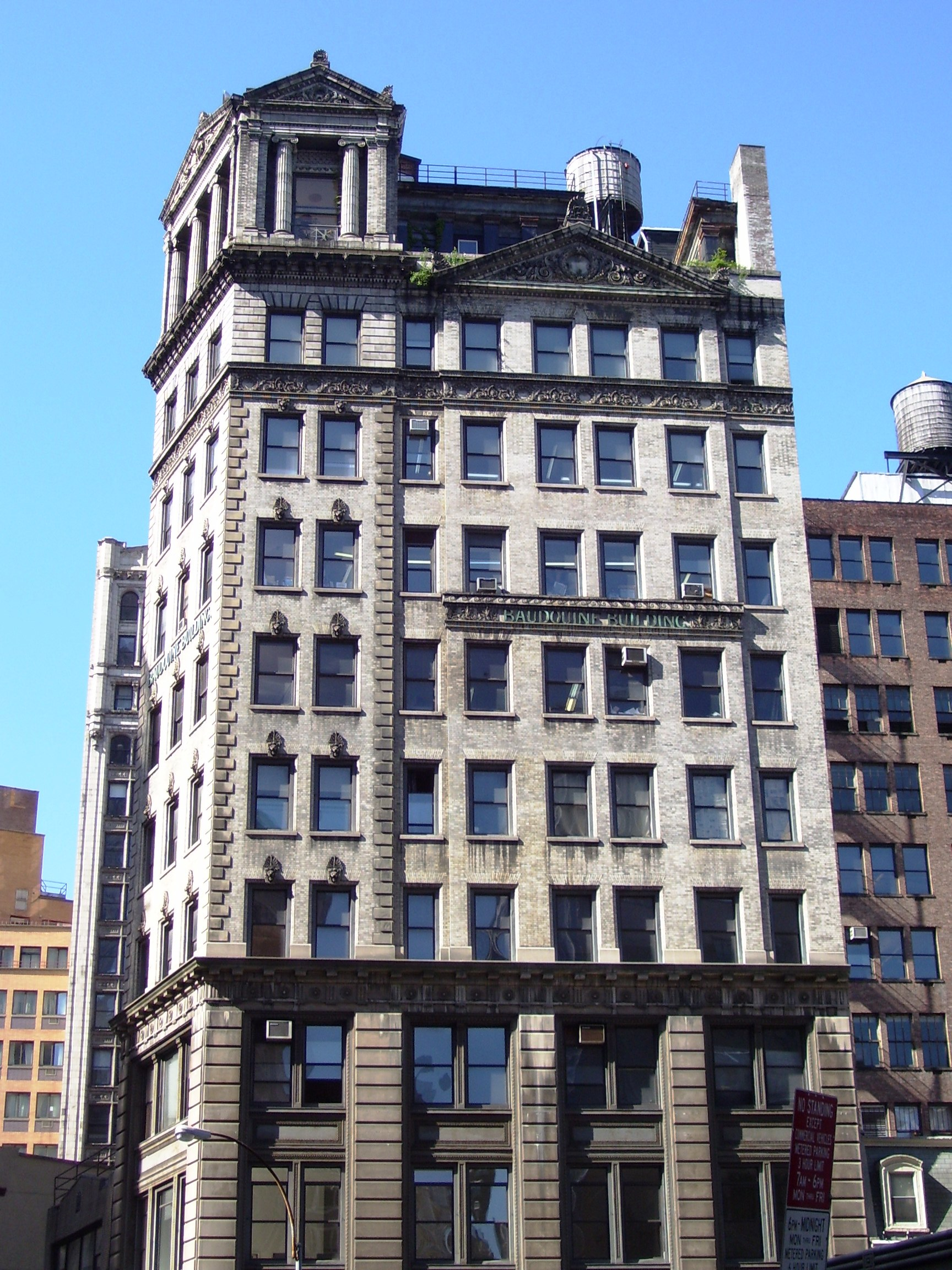
Baudouine Building, 1181 Broadway, Manhattan, New York City.

Charles Baudouine (June 1, 1808 – January 13, 1895) was an American cabinetmaker and interior decorator, and was the patriarch of a major family in New York society in the late nineteenth and early twentieth centuries.

== Life and work ==
Born in New York of Huguenot ancestry, Baudouine was first listed as a cabinetmaker in the New York City Directory of 1829–30, working at 508 Pearl Street. He is considered one of the most talented cabinetmakers to have worked in New York in the post-Duncan Phyfe era. Indeed, Ernest Hagen, himself a well-known cabinetmaker (who had at one time worked for Baudouine), called him "the leading cabinetmaker of New York". Much of Baudouine's work was executed in the Rococo Revival style, based on simplified Louis XV designs.

Around 1840, Baudouine was hired by Cyrus West Field, a paper-industry magnate and father of the first transatlantic telegraph cable, to furnish his home in New York's Gramercy Park neighborhood. This marked the first time in the city's history that a professional designer was hired to decorate a private residence.

In A Stranger's Guide in the City of New-York, published in 1852, visitors were recommended to see Baudouine's shop at 335 Broadway, which the book described as "one of the greatest attractions in the City." A furniture label used by Baudouine at the time declared that his establishment "keeps constantly on hand the Largest Assortment of Elegant Furniture to be found in the United States." He employed a work force of about 200, including 70 cabinetmakers. German designer Anthony Kimbel worked in Baudouine's shop, which closed about 1856.

== Family and estate ==
Due to Baudouine's wealth and prominence, his relatives and their various activities were featured frequently in the New York press from the 1890s to the 1930s. For example, Baudouine's grandson, also named Charles A. Baudouine, was renowned for his activities in the equestrian world. Another Baudouine grandson, John F. Baudouine, declared bankruptcy after a failed business venture, and was later involved in a sensationally publicized divorce, claiming at one point that he could not "live like a gentleman" on less than $35,000 a year.

Upon his death, the elder Baudouine left his estate in a trust, worth roughly $1,400,000 at the time, to his son Abram. Baudouine further directed that future income from the estate would be divided, half going to Abram and half to Baudouine's grandsons, John and Charles, who were sons of the elder Baudouine's deceased daughter Margaret Martine and who had legally adopted the Baudouine surname of their grandfather. The trust included extremely valuable real estate holdings in New York City, including 180, 392, 458, 510, 690 and 1181 Broadway; 21 to 25 and 40 Warren Street; 19 West 55th Street; 256 and 264 Fifth Avenue; and Baudouine's residence at 718 Fifth Avenue. (The property at 1181 Broadway is extant, and is still called the Baudouine Building; designed by Alfred Zucker, it has a small Greco-Roman temple at the top, called "a little Parnassus in the sky" by chairwoman Sherida E. Paulsen of the Landmarks Preservation Commission.)

In 1918, following Abram's death, the grandsons were sued by John F. Baudouine's daughter Marguerite Baudouine Burke, who alleged that her father had "lived a life of dissipation, idleness, and ostentation, and at the same time lavished large sums on social parasites and other persons who had no moral or legal claim on him." Burke asserted that her great-grandfather was "justly proud of his success and desired to perpetuate his name and fame by passing the corpus of his estate to his lineal descendants intact and unencumbered," and that "It was not his intention that the life beneficiaries should live in idleness and rely solely upon his large estate, nor did he contemplate that any part of his estate would be wasted in riotous living." Both grandsons denounced the suit. By this time, the estate's value had increased to $3,000,000. In December 1918, a few days after the death of the younger Charles Baudouine, the court found for Mrs. Burke, and removed the grandsons as trustees. In April 1920 that judgment was reversed on appeal; in the wake of this litigation, however, the frequency of the Baudouine family's appearances in the press declined significantly.
