= The Grand Madison =

Building in Manhattan, New York

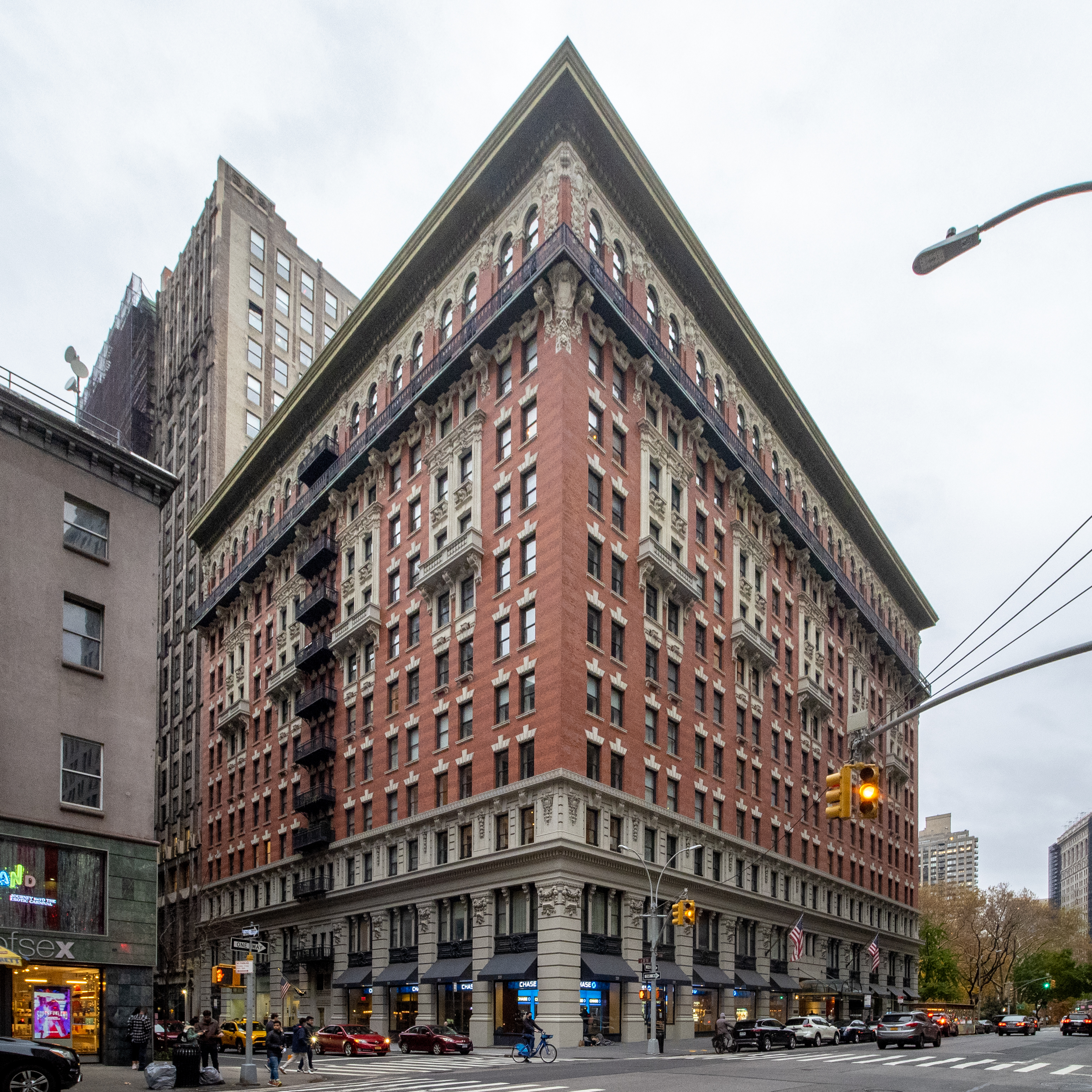
- Interactive map of the The Grand Madison area

General information
- Architectural style: Renaissance Revival
- Location: Manhattan, New York City
- Coordinates: 40°44′36.5″N 73°59′16″W
- Opened: 1906

Design and construction
- Architects: Francis H. Kimball and Harry E. Donnell

The Grand Madison, originally the Brunswick Building, is an office building located at 225 Fifth Avenue between East 26th and 27th Streets in Manhattan, New York City, on the north side of Madison Square Park. The building is part of the Madison Square North Historic District, a New York City designated landmark district, and is located in the neighborhood known as NoMad ("NOrth of MADison Square Park").

== History ==
The Renaissance Revival building "is constructed of multi-colored brick laid in a faint striped pattern, exquisitely ornamented in contrasting limestone. Its palazzo composition is articulated by a rusticated, trabeated base and arcaded loggia under an impressive cornice." Designed by architects Francis H. Kimball and Harry E. Donnell, the Brunswick Building was completed in 1907.

The 1907 structure replaced some brownstone residences and the once-fashionable Hotel Brunswick, a series of three connected buildings remodeled by Henry Hobson Richardson in 1870-71. Reflecting the stark commercial turn of the neighborhood, the new Brunswick Building served as an office and loft building after briefly being considered by the developers as the site for a new hotel. The architectural press sniffed at its “commonplace” commercial function, savaging the building upon its completion as “a monument of vulgarity and turpitude.” Time has considerably improved the building’s critical fortunes. A 1999 Columbia University academic study that presaged its landmark status praised the structure’s “multi-colored brick laid in a faint striped pattern, exquisitely ornamented in contrasting limestone. Its palazzo composition is articulated by a rusticated, trabeated base and arcaded loggia under an impressive cornice."

For the latter quarter of the twentieth century, 225 Fifth Avenue was known as the New York Gift Building, for many years the city's premier showcase for glass, ceramic and silver giftware. In 2008, ElAd Properties converted the building into 195 luxury apartments and renamed it The Grand Madison. Its common spaces were renovated by Rawlins Design beginning in 2012.

== See also ==
- Madison Square
- NoMad – the neighborhood north and west of Madison Square Park
