= Madison Square North Historic District =

Coordinates: 40.7442°N 73.9883°W

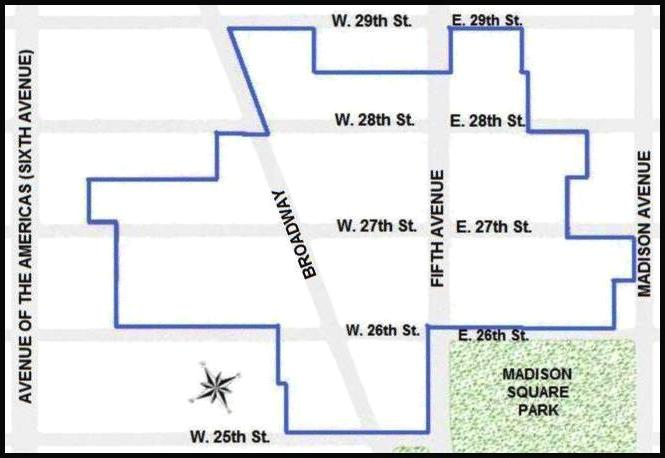
Boundaries of the district

The Madison Square North Historic District is in Manhattan, New York City, and was created on June 26, 2001, by the city's Landmarks Preservation Commission.

Lying north and west of Madison Square Park, the district's boundaries are irregular. The main southern boundary is 26th Street between Madison Avenue almost to the Avenue of the Americas ("Sixth Avenue"), but a portion of 25th Street, from Fifth Avenue to somewhat west of Broadway, is included. On the north, the district goes no further than 29th Street, but portions of it stop at 28th Street or between 27th Street and 28th Street. From east to west, the district is entirely between Madison and Sixth Avenues, without encompassing the entirety of any of these blocks.

According to the commission's Designation Report, the District:

consists of approximately 96 buildings representing the period of New York City's commercial history from the 1870s to the 1930s when this section prospered, first, as a major entertainment district of hotels, clubs, stores and apartment buildings, and then, as a mercantile district of high-rise office and loft structures. ... [T]he district also contains numerous row houses, Art-Deco style towers, as well as modest twentieth-century commercial structures, all of which testify to each successive phase in [the] area's development.

The Historic District lies primarily within the Manhattan neighborhood known as NoMad, for "NOrth of MADison Square Park".

== Gallery ==
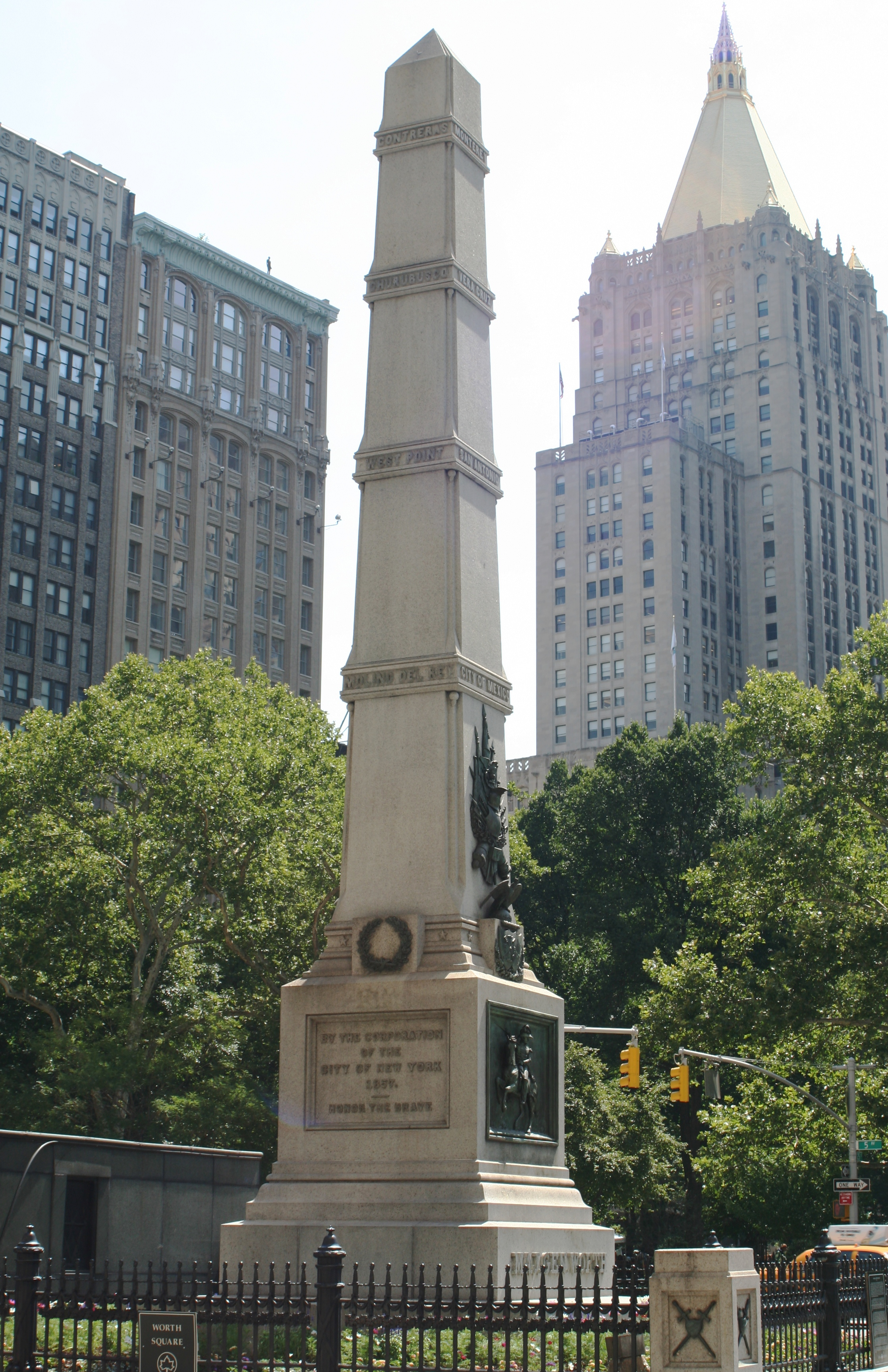
Monument (1857) to Mexican War hero General Worth, with Madison Square Park in the background

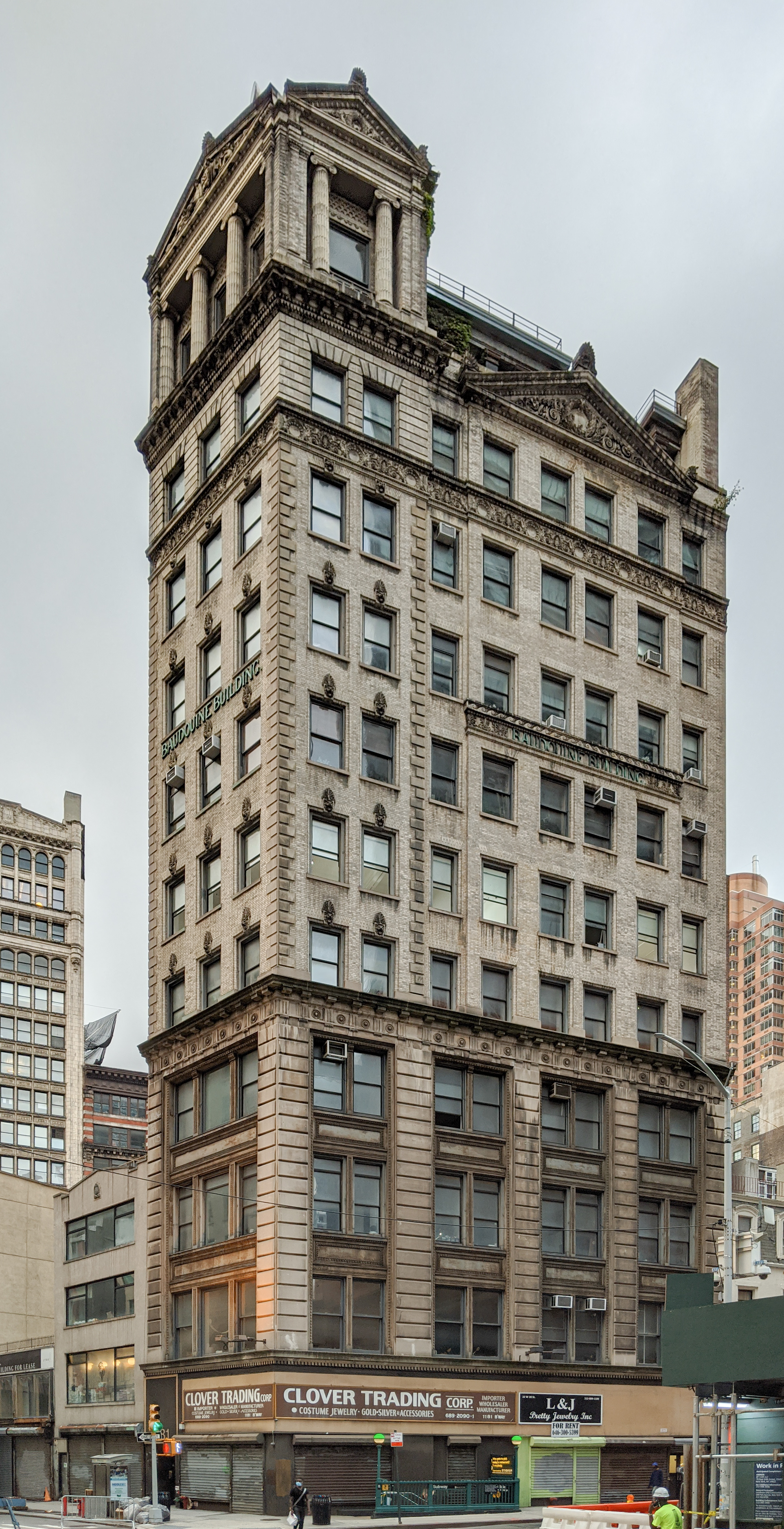
The Baudouine Building (1896) at Broadway and West 28th Street has a Greco-Roman temple at the top

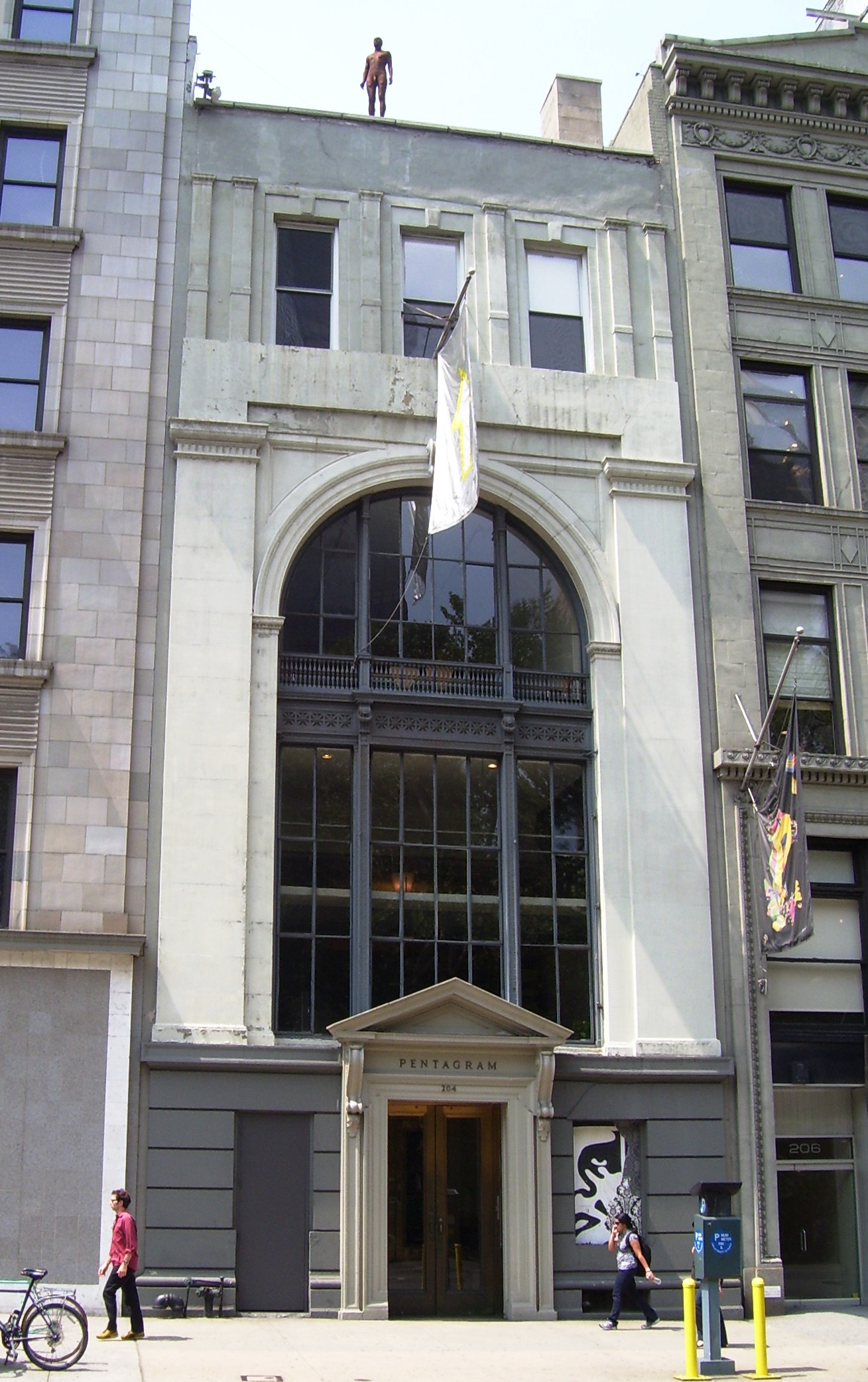
204 Fifth Avenue (1913), designed by C. P. H. Gilbert, with a "Gormley" statue on top

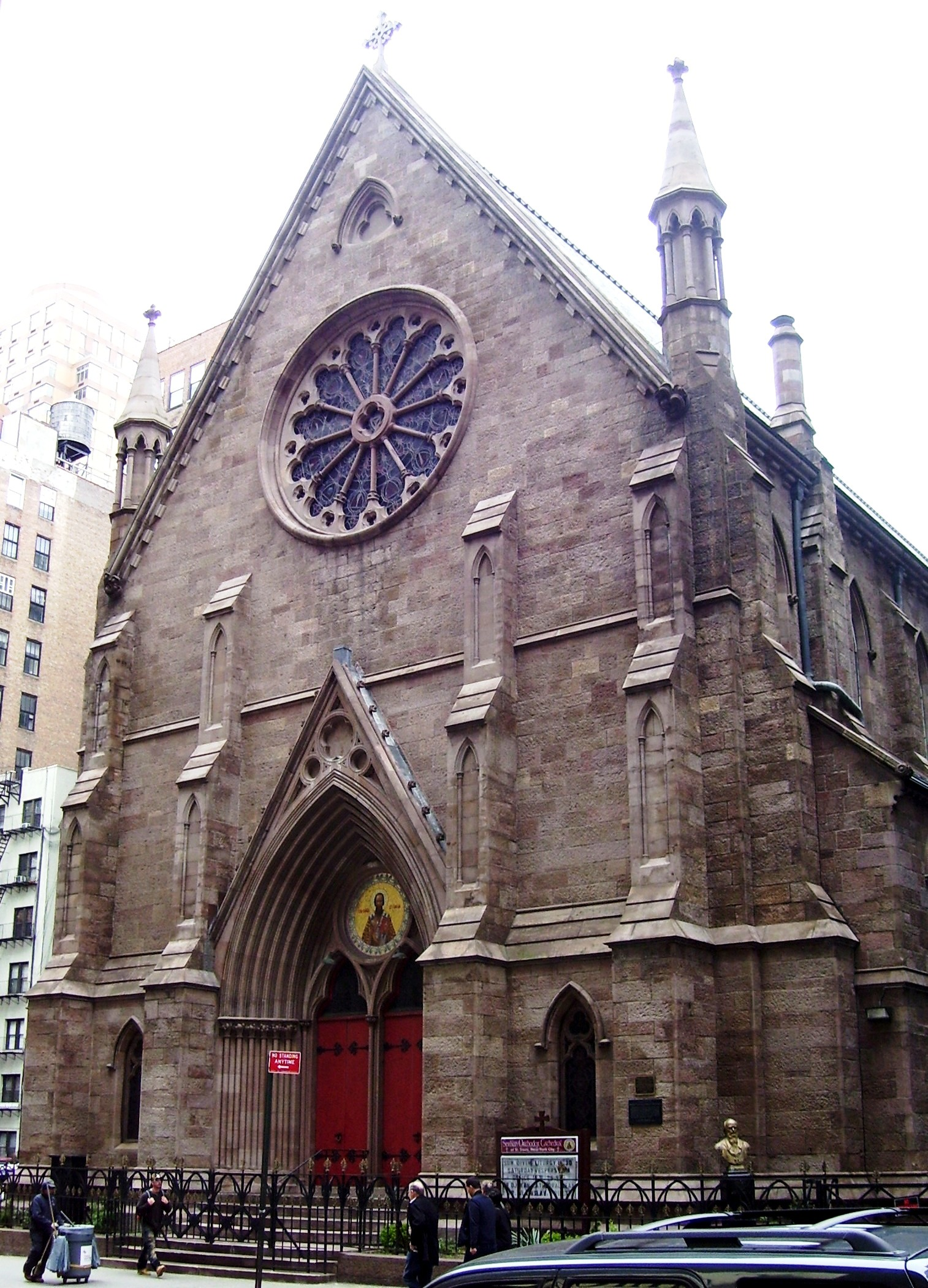
The Serbian Orthodox Cathedral of St. Sava (1855) was designed by Richard Upjohn

== See also ==
- Flatiron District
- The Grand Madison
- Herald Square
- Little Church Around the Corner
- Madison Square
- Midtown Manhattan
- Prince George Hotel
- NoMad
