= Louis Korn =

American architect

Louis Korn was an American architect from New York City who graduated from Columbia University in 1891. His notable buildings include 9-11 East 16th Street and 91-93 Fifth Avenue, both located in the Ladies' Mile Historic District, and 174-178 Hudson Street which is located in the Tribeca North Historic District. He is known to have specialized in store and loft buildings.

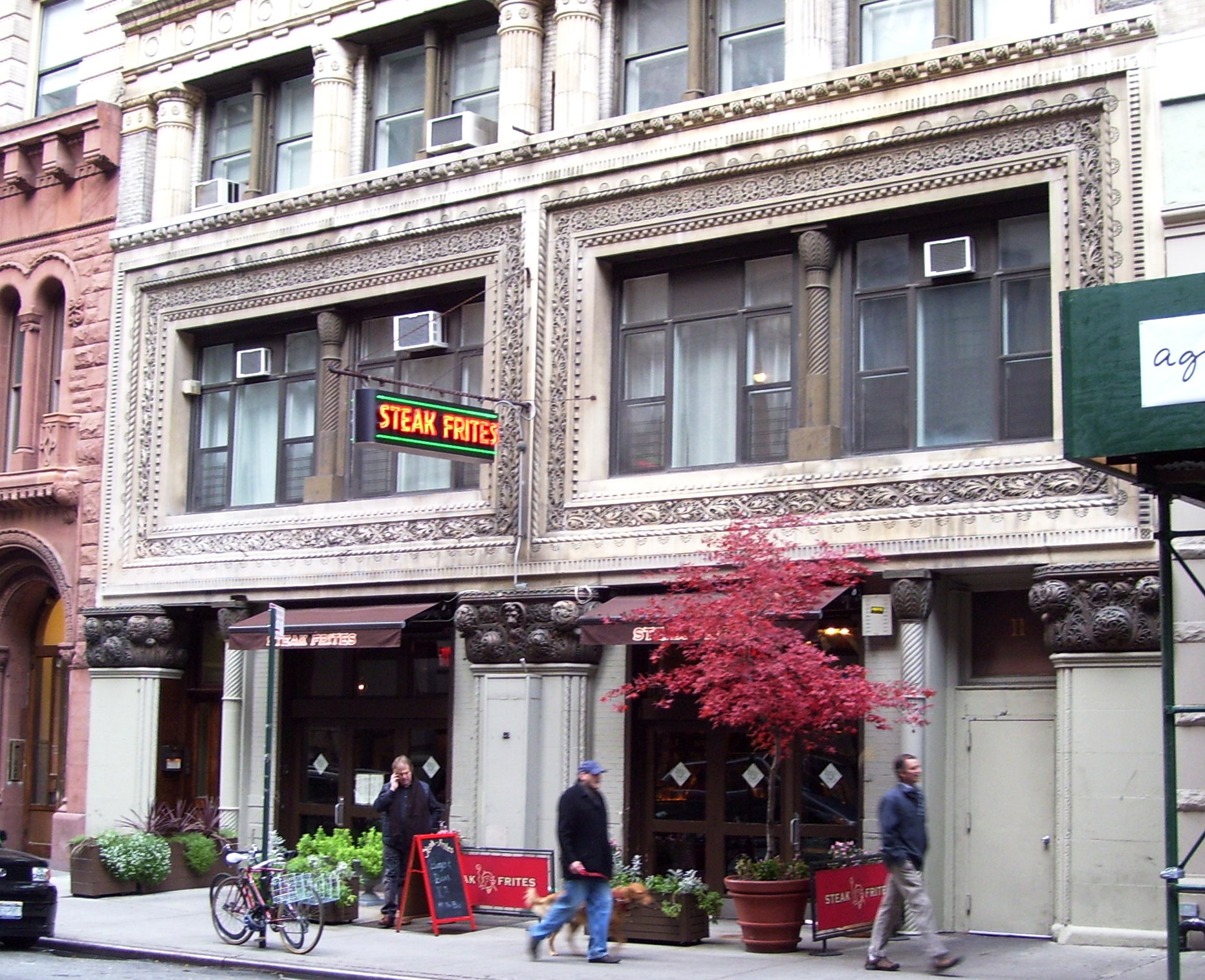
9-11 East 16th St ground floors

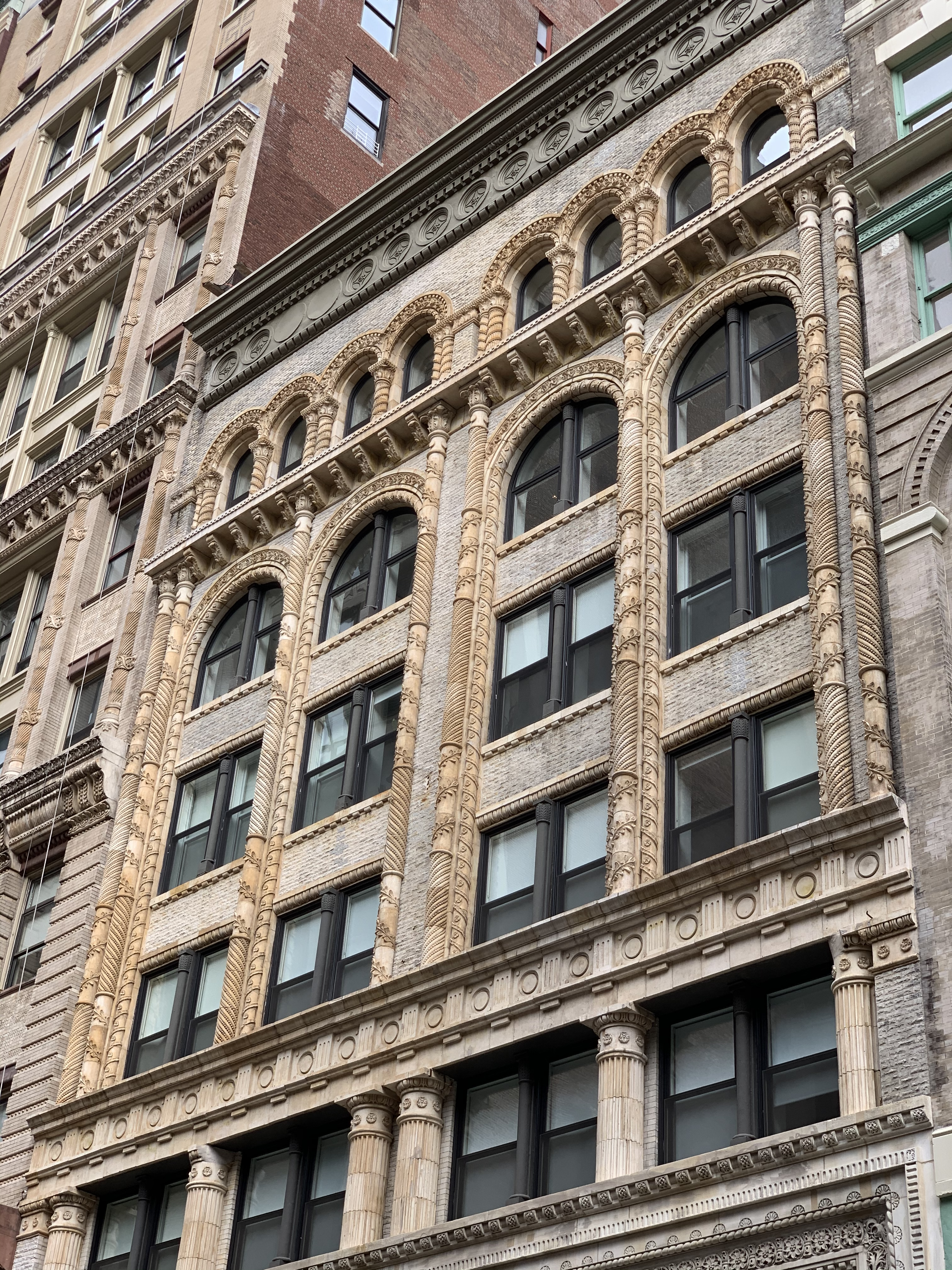
9-11 East 16th Street upper front facade

== Notable New York City buildings ==
- 7 Great Jones Street
- 9-11 East 16th Street
- 34-42 West 14th Street
- 91-93 Fifth Avenue
- 141-145 Wooster Street
- 174-178 Hudson Street
- 137 Hudson Street
- 627-629 Broadway
- 736 Broadway
