= 9–11 East 16th Street =

Building in Manhattan, New York

Coordinates: 40°44′14″N 73°59′30″W

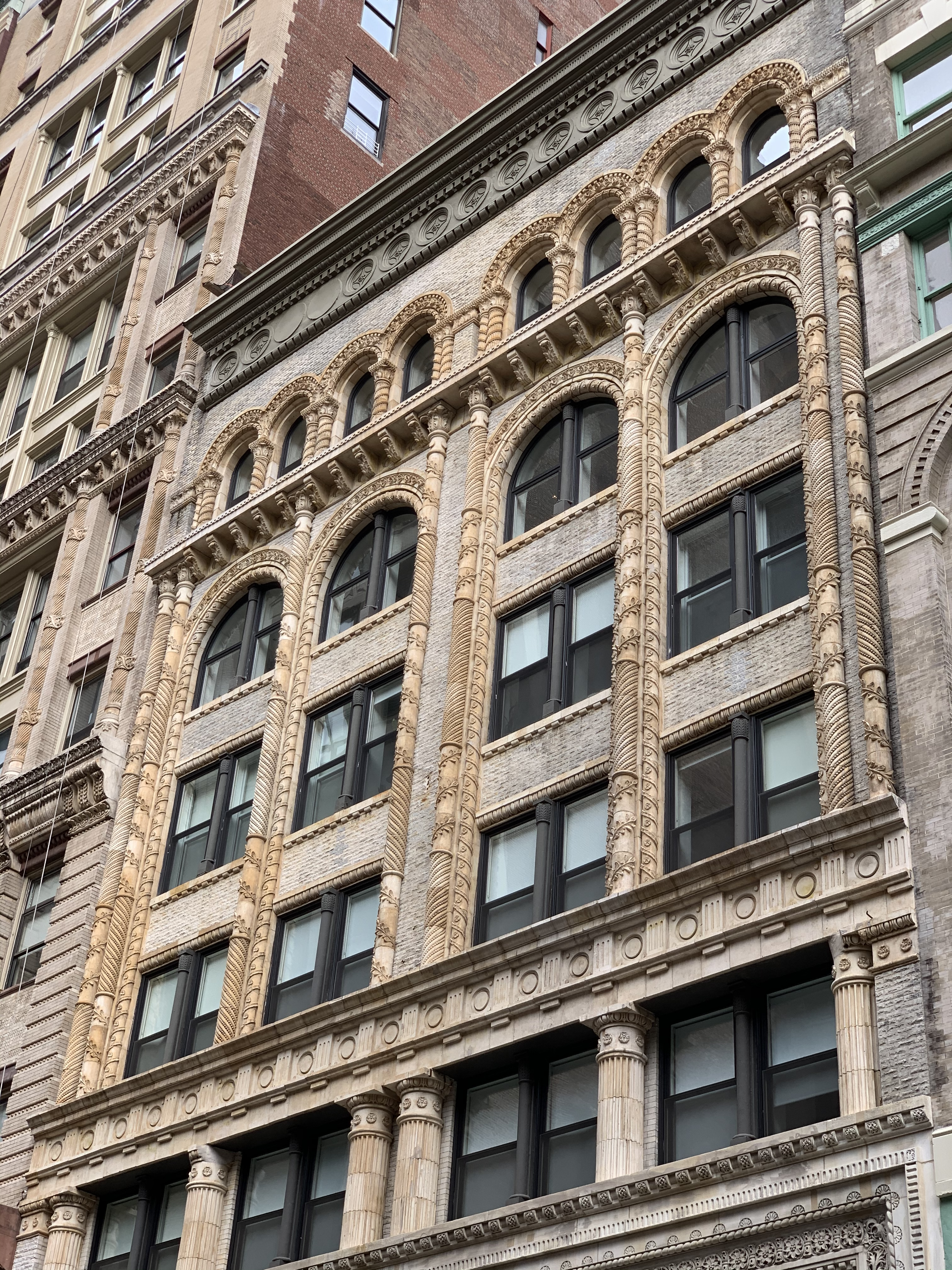
- Upper front facade
- Interactive map of the 9–11 East 16th Street area

General information
- Architectural style: Sullivanesque
- Location: 9–11 East 16th Street, Manhattan, New York City
- Construction started: 1895
- Completed: 1896

Technical details
- Floor count: 7

Design and construction
- Architect: Louis Korn

9–11 East 16th Street is a seven-story building between Union Square West and Fifth Avenue in the Ladies' Mile Historic District of Manhattan in New York City, just west of Union Square. The building was designed by Louis Korn for Martin Johnson and built between 1895 and 1896.
