= 91-93 Fifth Avenue =

Coordinates: 40.737703°N 73.992207°W

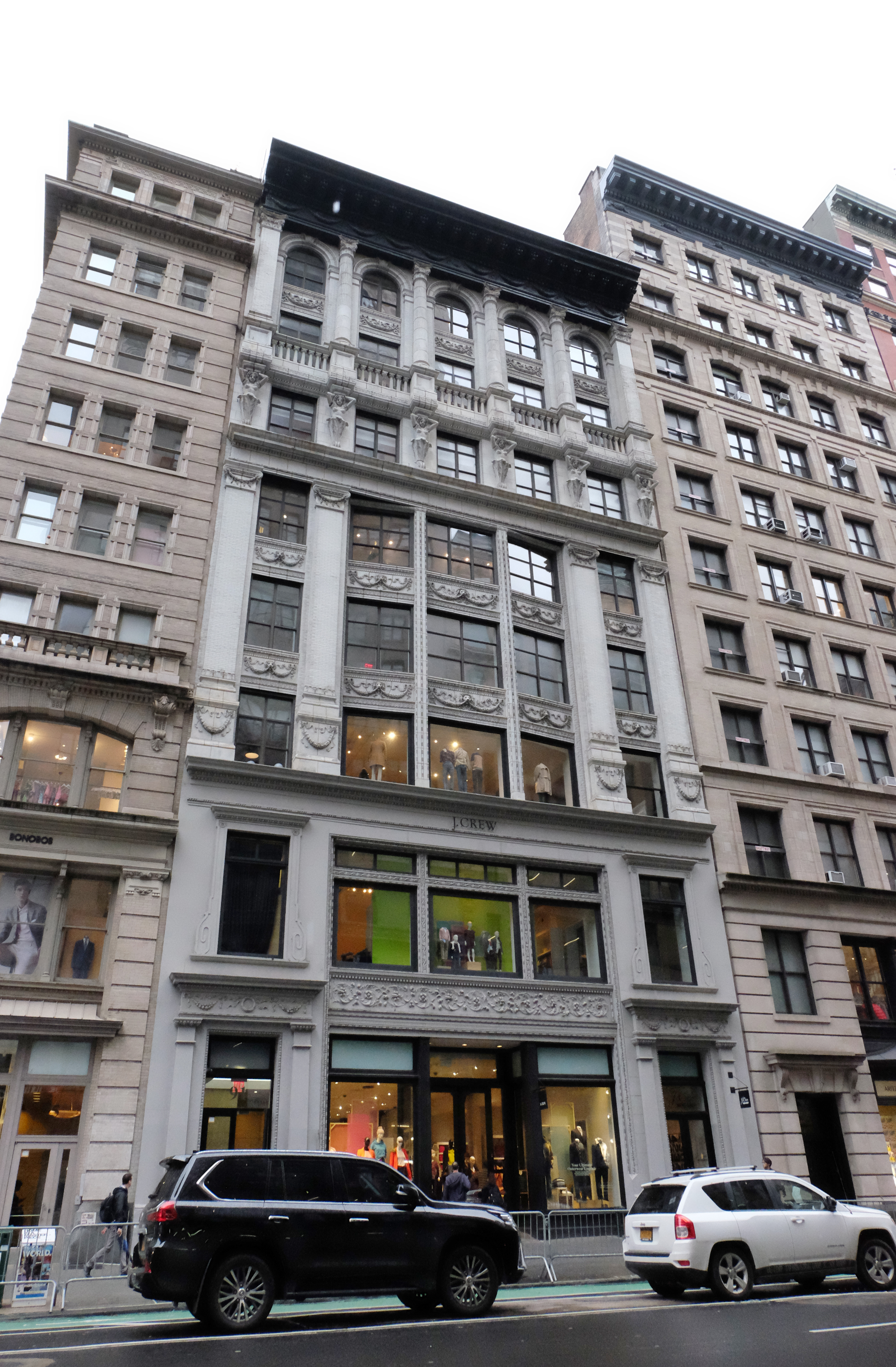
- 91-93 Fifth Avenue
- Interactive map of the 91-93 Fifth Avenue area

General information
- Architectural style: Beaux-Arts
- Location: 91-93 Fifth Avenue, Manhattan, New York City
- Construction started: 1895
- Completed: 1896

Technical details
- Floor count: 8

Design and construction
- Architect: Louis Korn

91-93 Fifth Avenue is an eight-story store and loft building between 16th and 17th Streets in the Ladies’ Mile Historic District of Manhattan in New York City. The building was designed by Louis Korn for Henry and Samuel Corn and built between 1895 and 1896. Previous tenants include the Oxford University Press (1900, 1905) and Clarendon Press (1905).

== Gallery ==
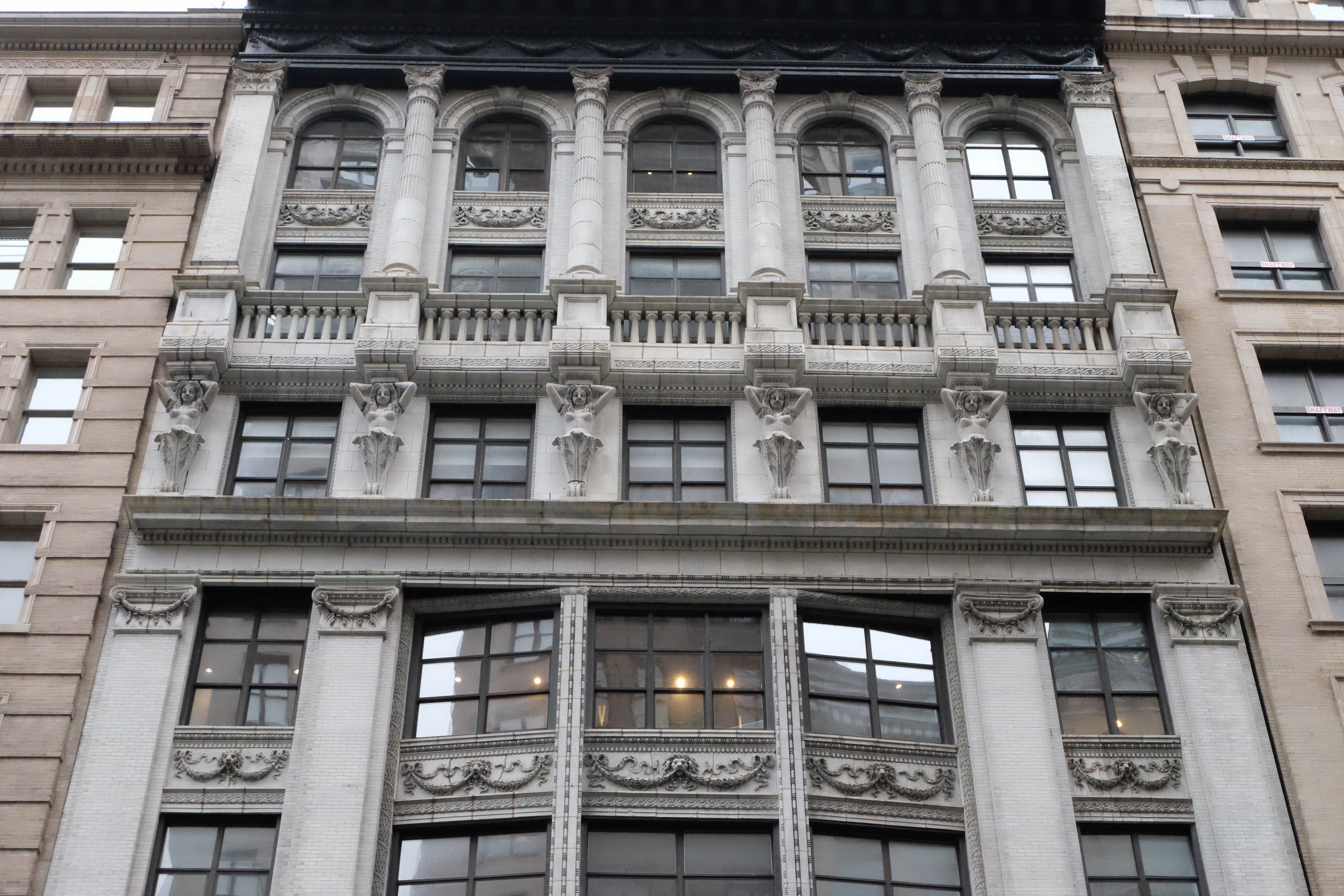
Front view showing the six caryatids

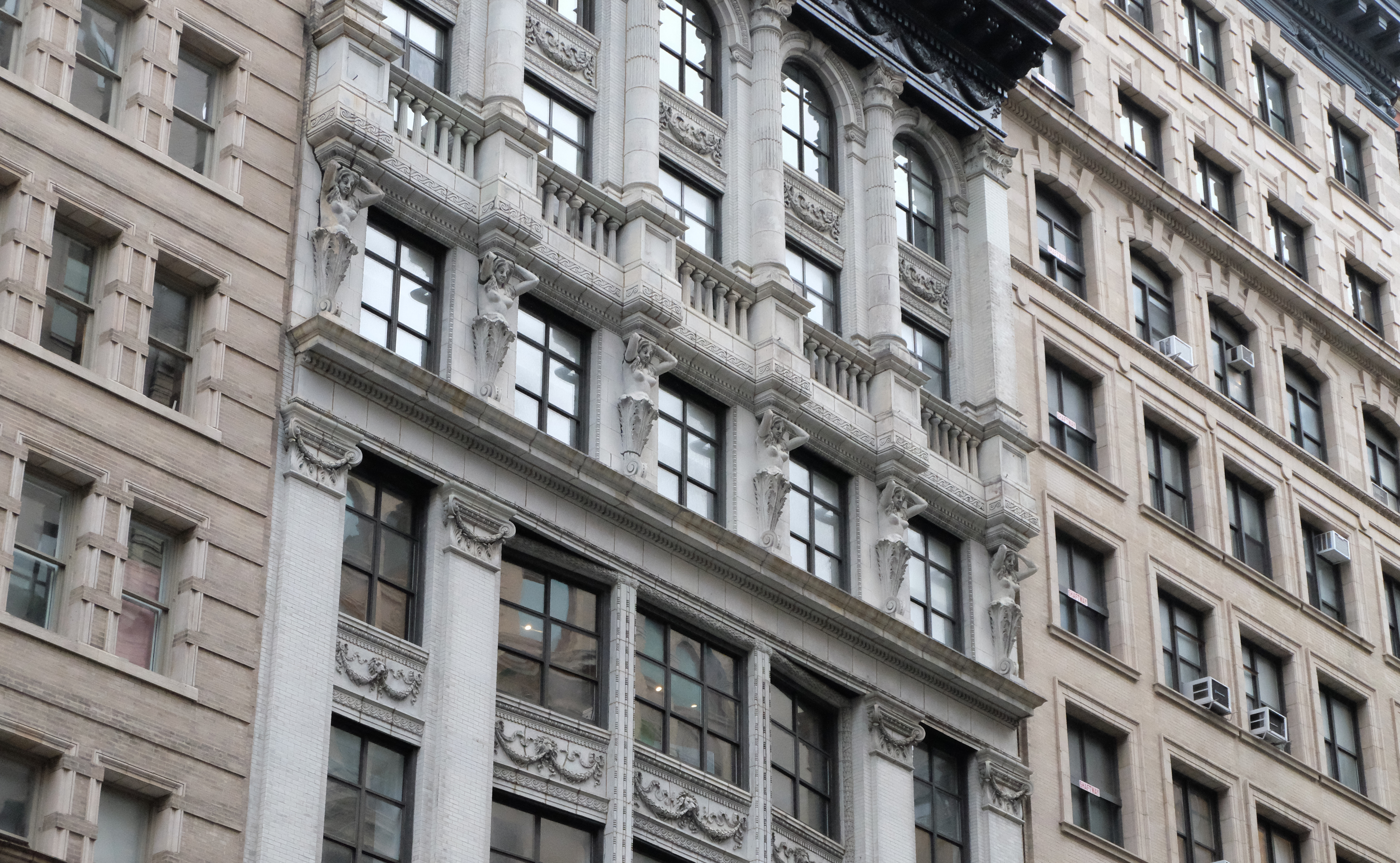
Three-quarter view of the caryatids

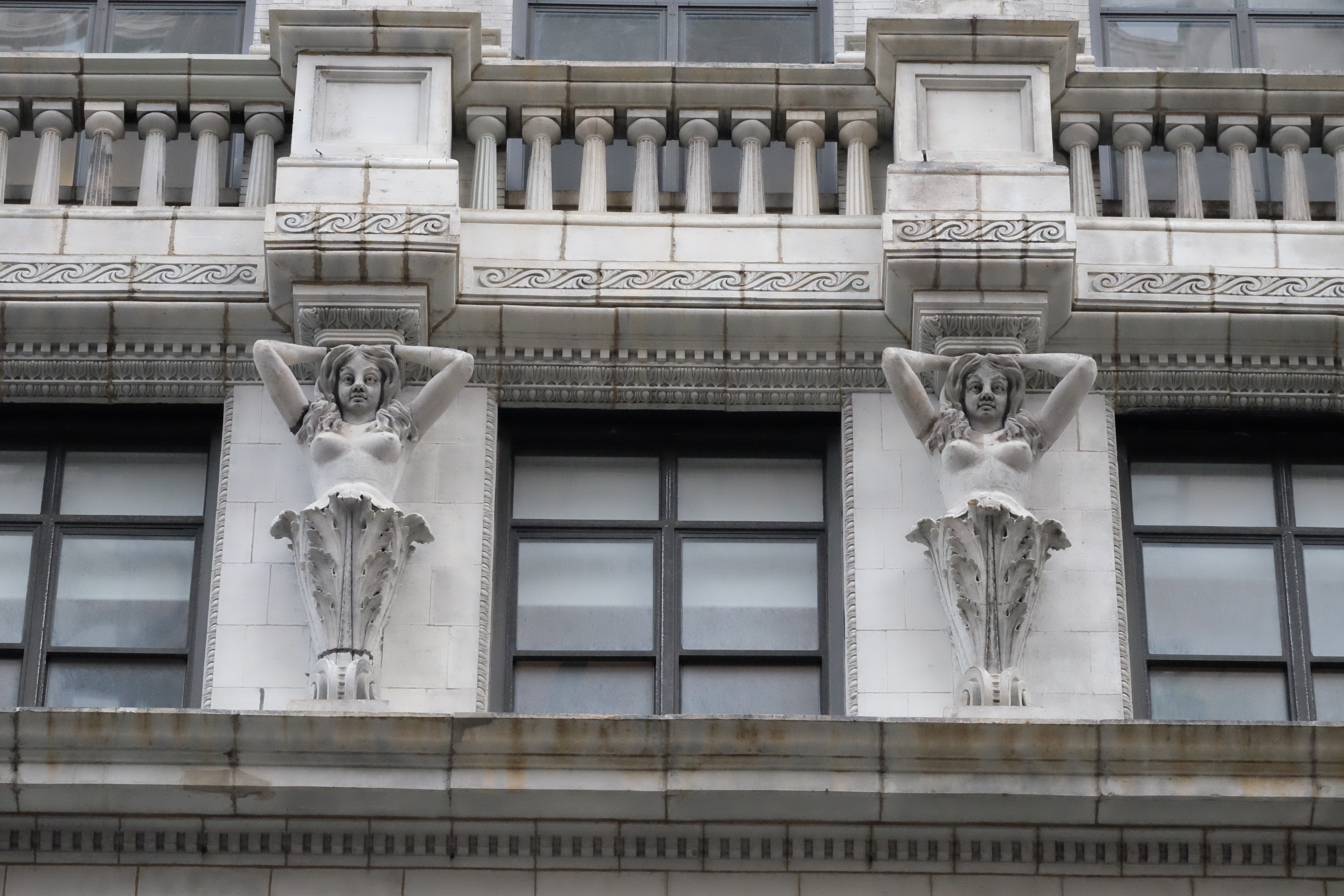
Front view showing two caryatids

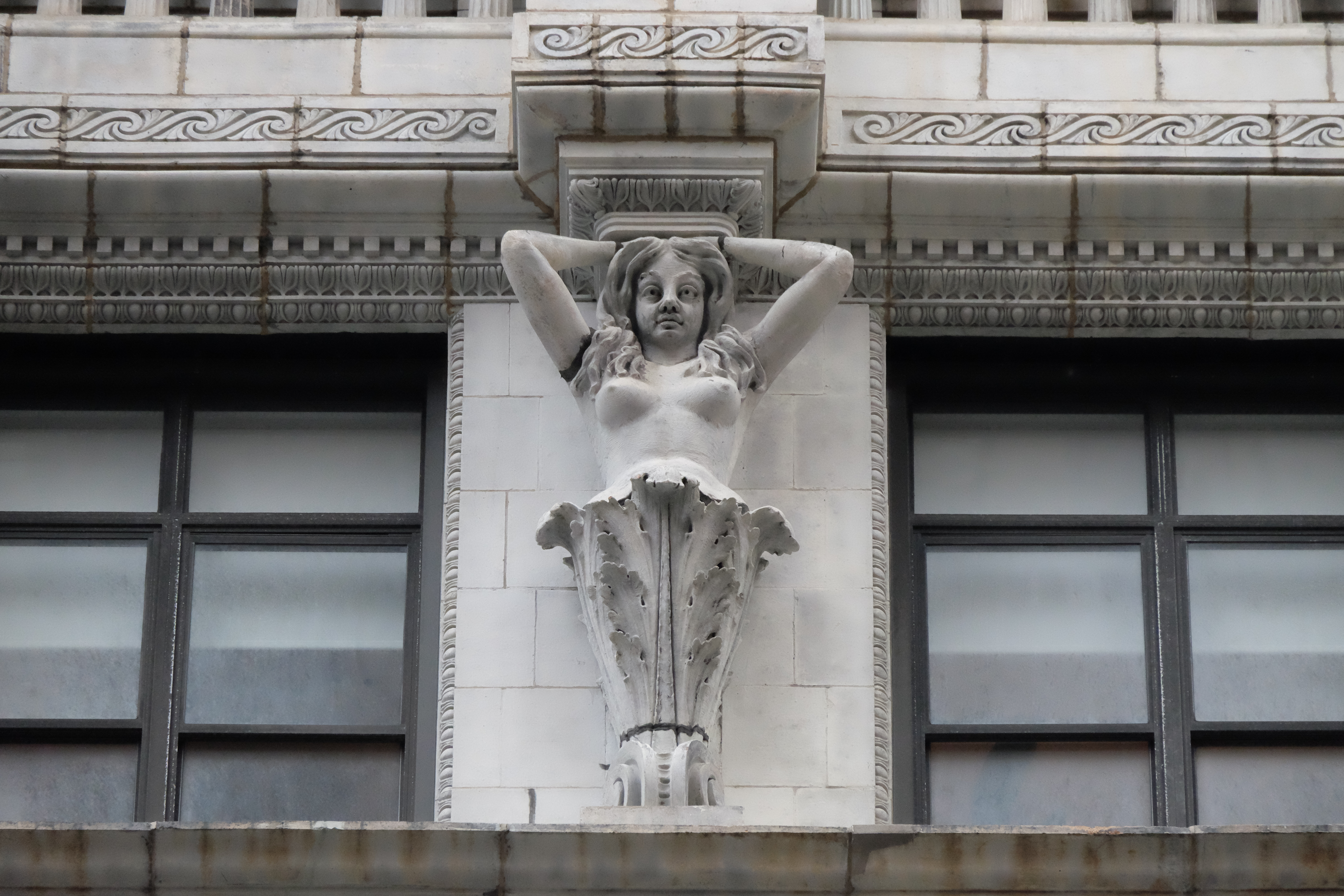
Front view of a caryatid

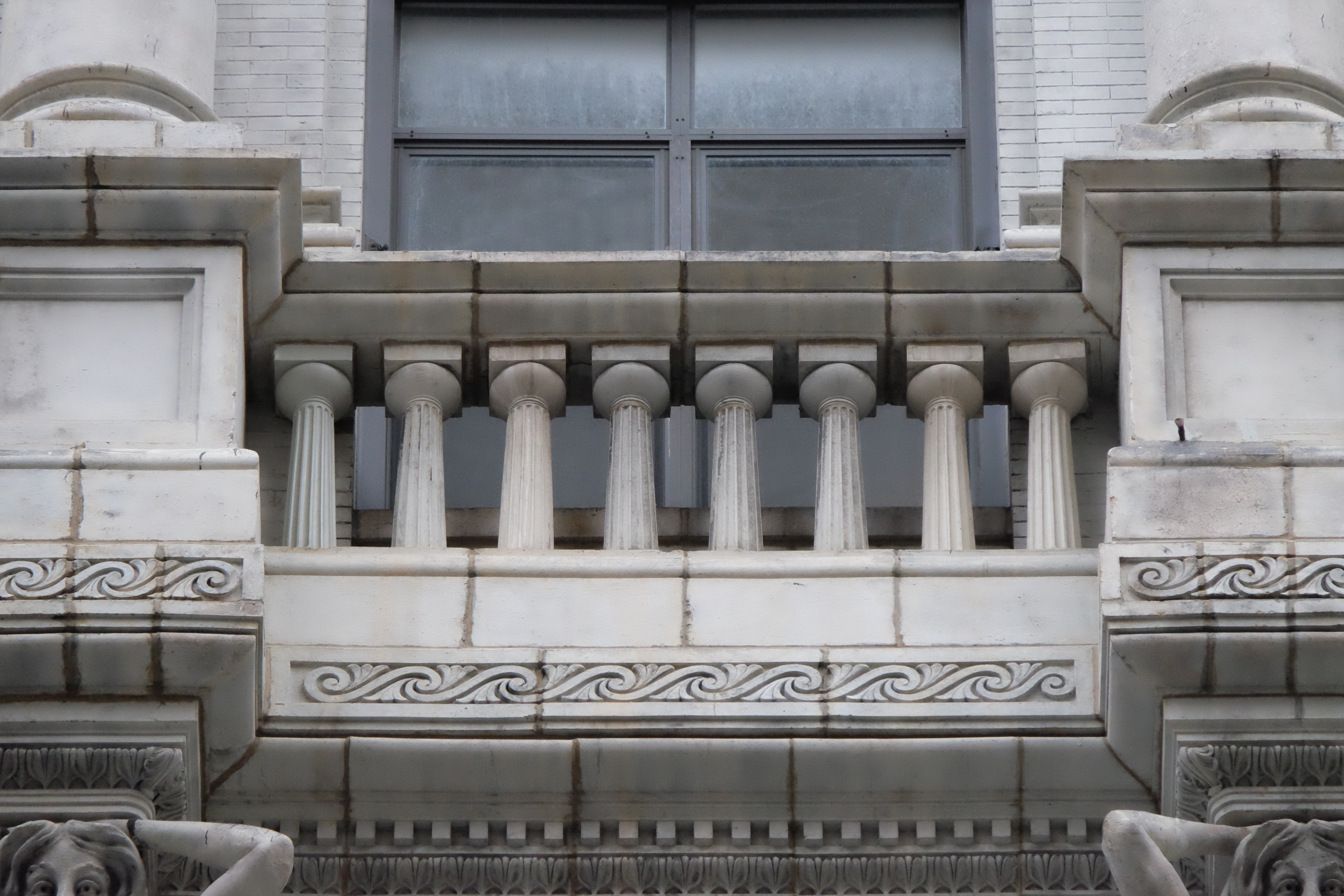
Balustrade detail

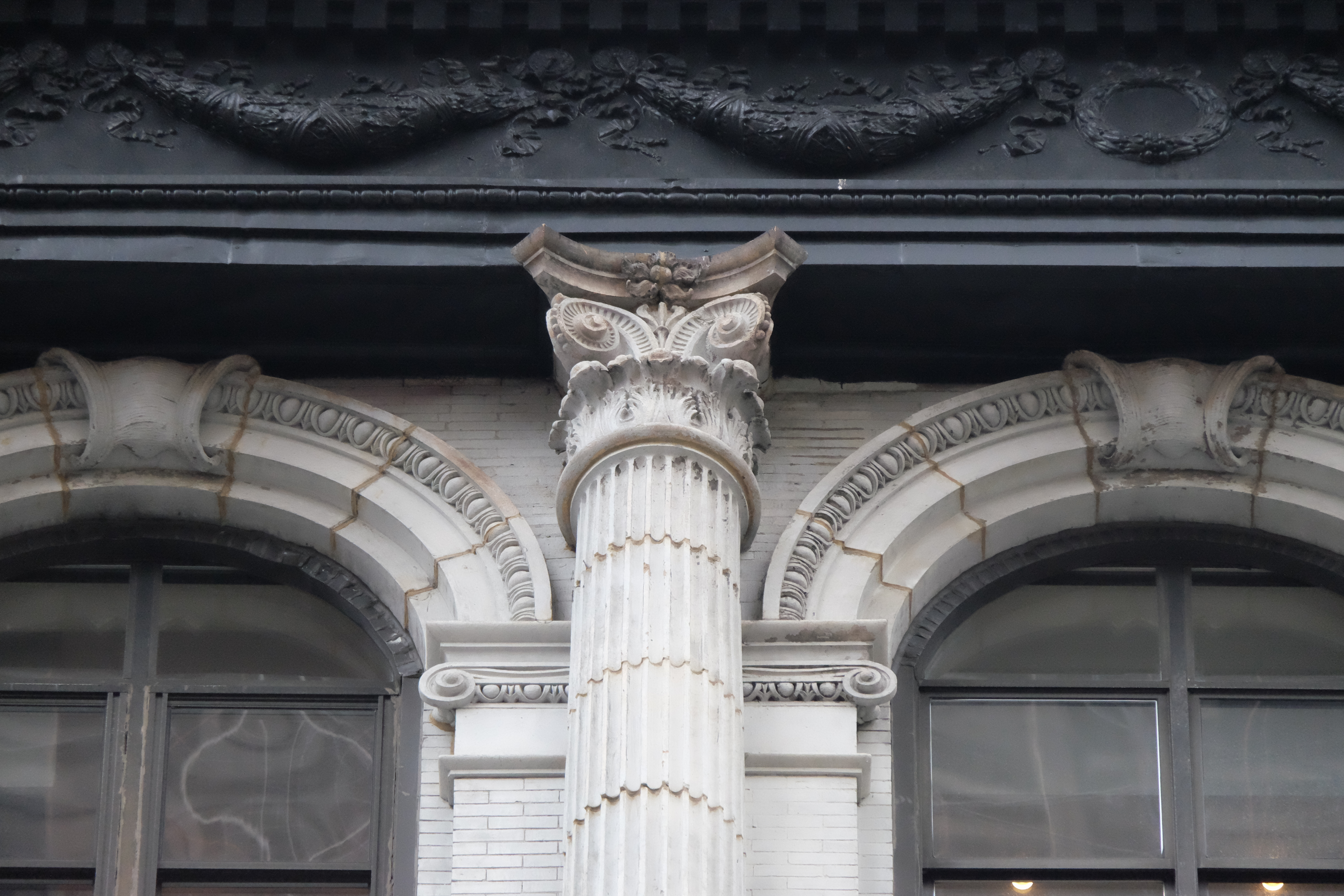
Front detail view of an eighth-floor column

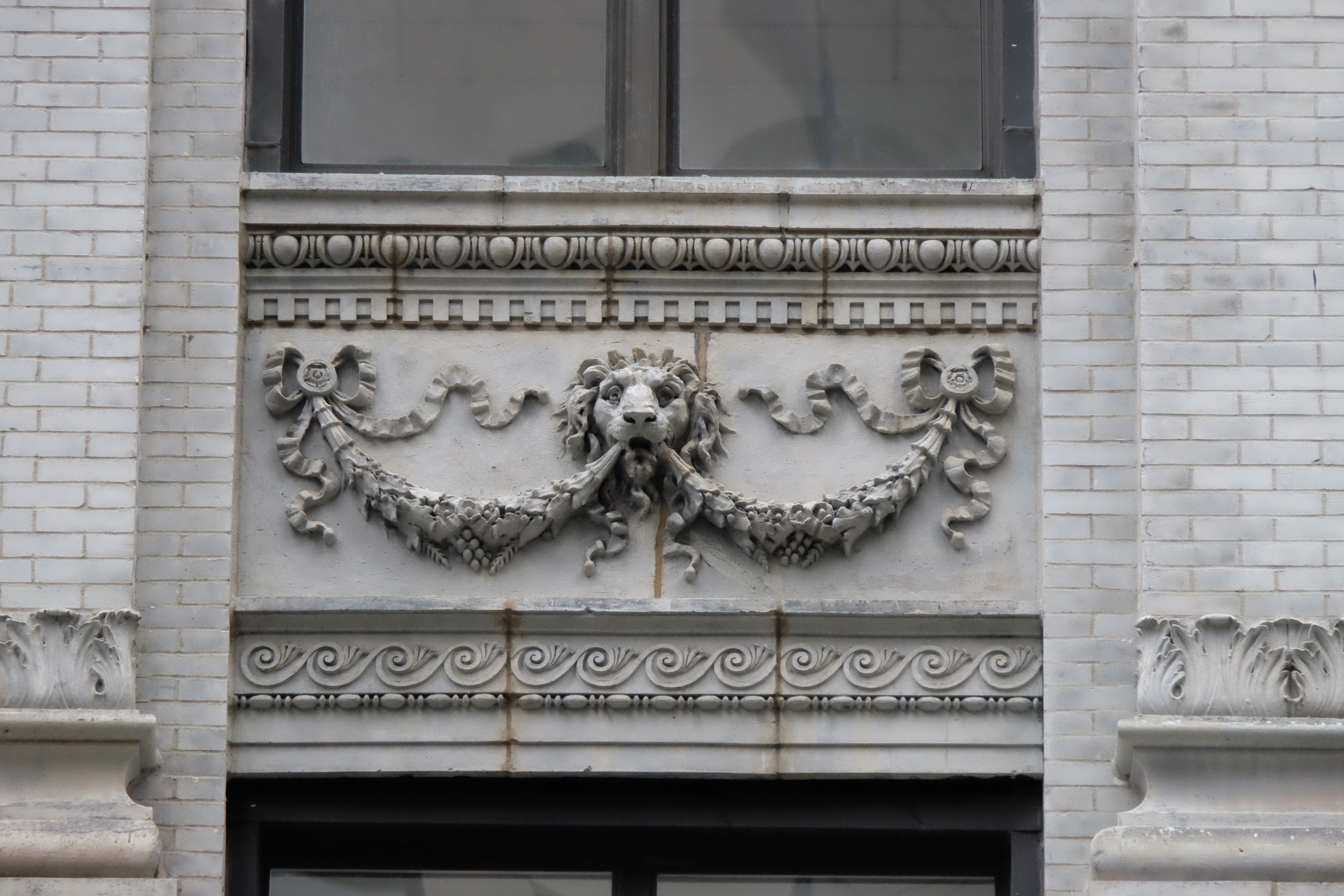
Spandrel ornament detail
