= Trygve Lie Plaza =

Public park in Manhattan, New York

- Interactive map of Trygve Lie Plaza
- Type: Urban park
- Location: Murray Hill, Manhattan, New York, US
- Coordinates: 40°44′55″N 73°58′13″W
- Area: 0.10 acres (0.04 ha)
- Authorized: 1948
- Operator: New York City Department of Parks and Recreation

Trygve Lie Plaza is a 0.10-acre (0.04 ha) public park in the Murray Hill neighborhood of Manhattan, New York City. Located on the west side of First Avenue between East 41st Street and East 42nd Street, the park was created in 1948 as part of the widening of First Avenue for the development of the United Nations. It was named after Trygve Lie in 1998.

== History ==
The site of the park was previously occupied by a strip of four story tenements that abutted the east side of the base of Tudor Tower in Tudor City. The new parkland, including the property for Ralph Bunche Park on the opposite side of East 42nd Street, was acquired by the city as part of the widening of First Avenue to accommodate the United Nations headquarters. These street improvements also included the construction of the vehicular tunnel that runs under First Avenue from East 42nd to 48th streets. To accommodate the construction of the south portal for the tunnel, a 28-foot-wide (8.5 m) strip of land was also removed from the western edge of the park on the opposite side of First Avenue (now called Robert Moses Playground). Condemnation of the land between East 41st and 42nd streets was authorized by the New York City Board of Estimate in August 1948. The land lot for the park has an area of 4,147 square feet (0.10 acres; 0.04 ha), with a frontage of 197.5 feet (60.2 m) and a depth of 21 feet (6.4 m).

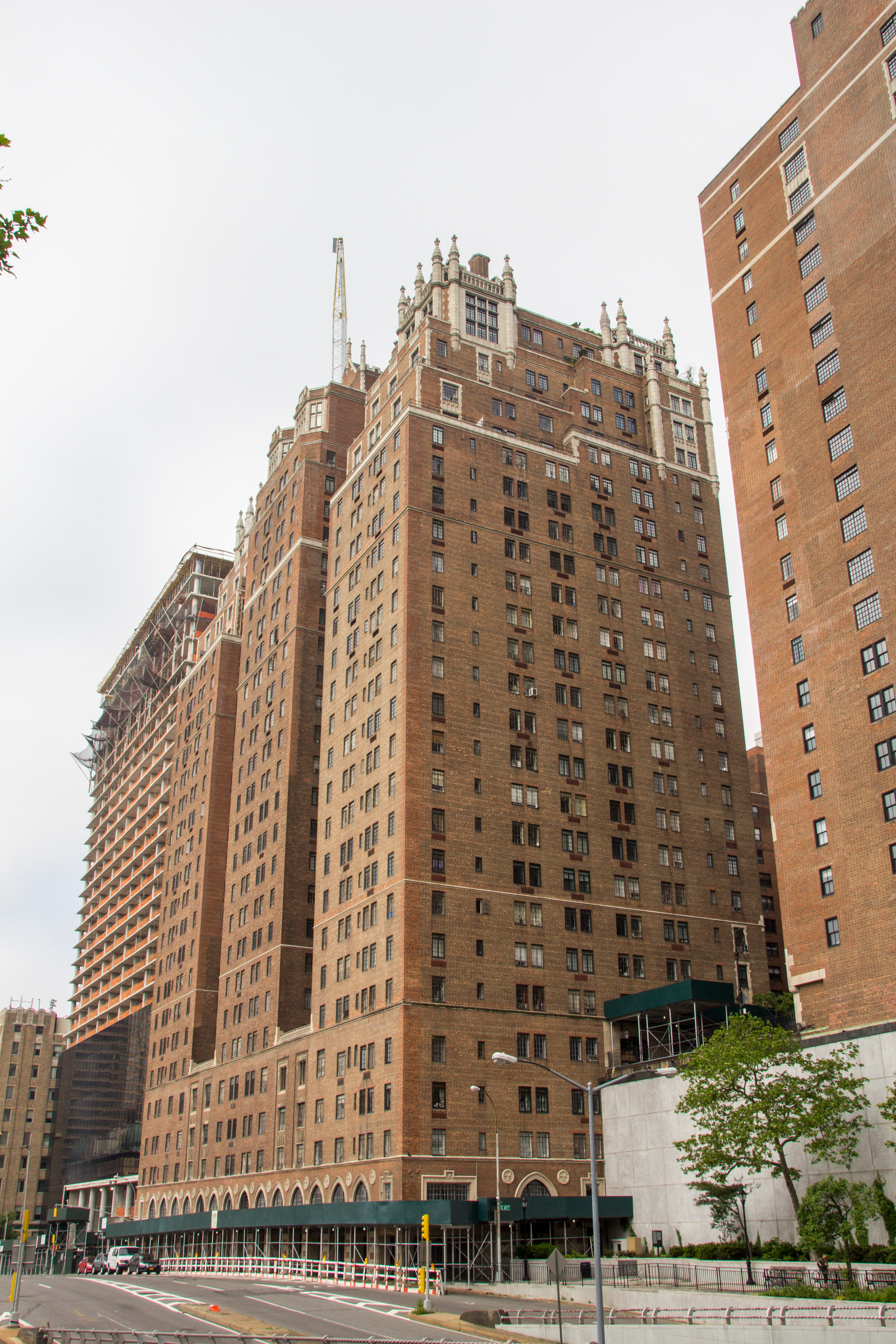
The retaining wall on the west side of the park and the pedestrian arcade below Windsor Tower

The park is not accessible from East 41st Street due to the presence of a 30-foot-high (9.1 m) retaining wall adjacent to Tudor City and the tunnel portal on First Avenue. The south end of the park connects to a pedestrian arcade that runs from East 40th to 41st streets in a sidewalk easement below Windsor Tower in Tudor City; the pedestrian walkway under the building was also built as part of the street improvements to accommodate the United Nations headquarters. The retaining wall along the western edge of the park includes a bronze tablet listing the individuals and firms associated with construction of the First Avenue Underpass from 1950 to 1952.

In 1998, the park was named after Trygve Lie, who had served as the first Secretary-General of the United Nations and was a supporter of locating the United Nations headquarters in New York City.

== Renovations ==
Renovations were made to the park in 2016, which included the installation of new trees, landscaping, benches, light poles, fencing, and concrete and bluestone pavement and repairs to retaining walls. A ribbon cutting ceremony to rededicate the plaza was held on September 18, 2016, with Norway's Prime Minister Erna Solberg and Minister of Foreign Affairs Børge Brende as well as William and Arthur Zeckendorf, the grandsons of Trygve Lie.

The renovated park also included the addition of a 17-foot-diameter (5.2 m) kinetic art sculpture on the retaining wall, The Peace Clock by Norwegian artist Lina Viste Grønli. The brass sculpture functions as a clock with a moving hour hand and displays the peace sign at 4:30 a.m. and 4:30 p.m. each day to the United Nations. The sculpture was funded by a group of donors and commissioned through the New York City Department of Cultural Affairs' Percent for Art program with the objective of using a concept based on either art or design, or both, to tell the story of Trygve Lie. The public art project was completed in partnership with the New York City Department of Parks and Recreation and the Royal Norwegian Consulate General in New York.
