= First Avenue (Manhattan) =

North-south avenue in Manhattan, New York

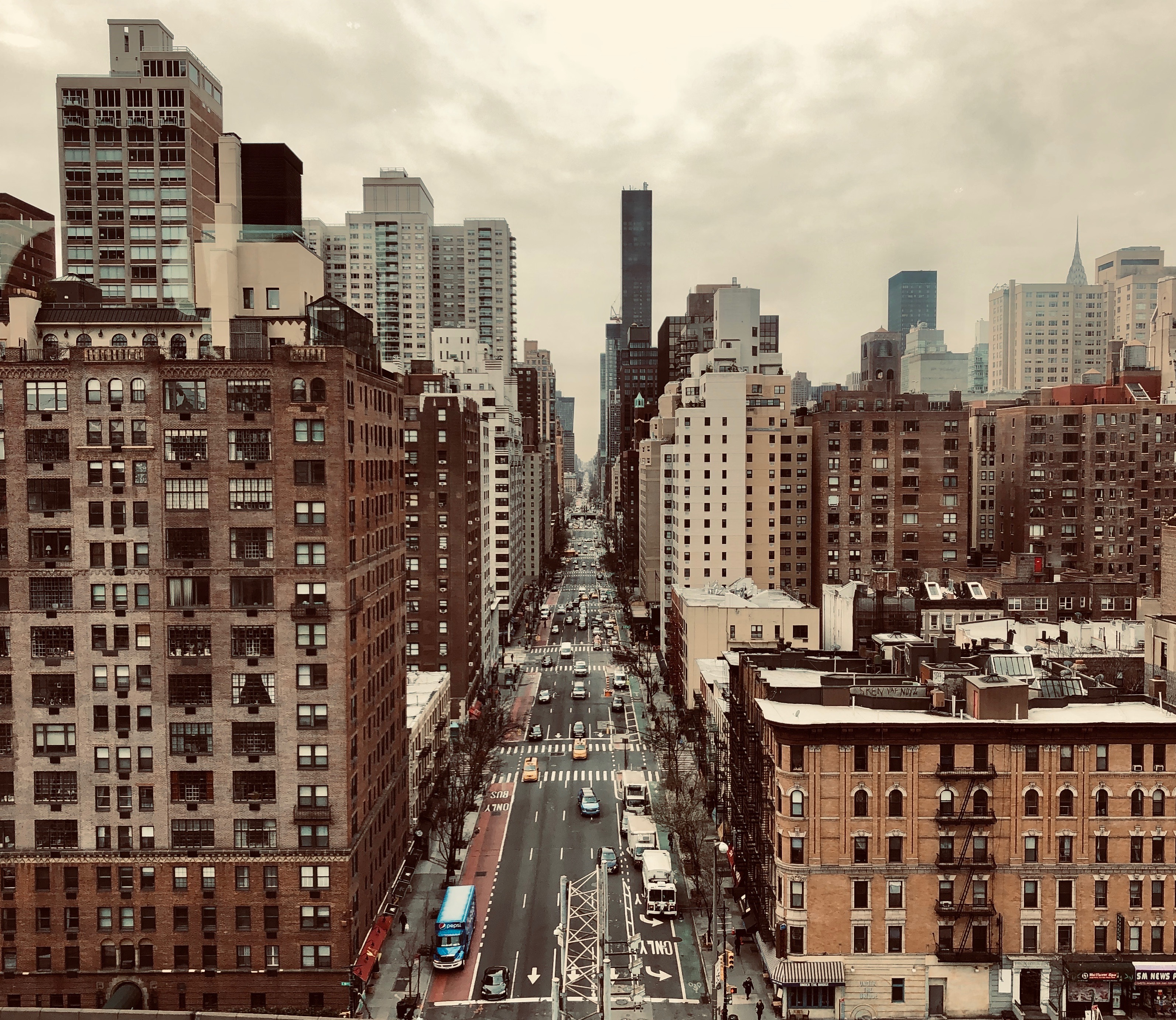
- Looking south down 1st Avenue from the Roosevelt Island Tramway
- Owner: City of New York
- Maintained by: NYCDOT
- Length: 6.3 mi (10.1 km)
- Location: Manhattan, New York City
- South end: Houston / Allen Streets in Lower East Side
- Major junctions: FDR Drive / Willis Avenue Bridge in East Harlem
- North end: East 127th Street in East Harlem
- East: Avenue A (Houston–14th Sts); Sutton Place (53rd–59th Sts); York Avenue (59th–92nd Sts); Pleasant Avenue (114th–120th Sts)
- West: Second Avenue

Construction
- Commissioned: March 1811

First Avenue is a north-south thoroughfare on the East Side of the New York City borough of Manhattan, running from Houston Street northbound to 127th Street. At 125th Street, most traffic continues onto the Willis Avenue Bridge over the Harlem River, which continues into the Bronx. South of Houston Street, the roadway continues as Allen Street south to Division Street. Traffic on First Avenue runs northbound (uptown) only.

== History ==
=== 1810s to 1940s ===
Like most of Manhattan's major north-south Avenues, First Avenue was proposed as part of the Commissioners' Plan of 1811 for Manhattan, which designated 12 broad north-south Avenues running the length of the island. The southern portions of the Avenue were cut and laid out shortly after the plan was adopted. The northern sections of the avenue would be graded and cut through at various intervals throughout the 19th century as the northward development of the island demanded.

The IRT Second Avenue Line ran above First Avenue from Houston Street to 23rd Street before turning west at 23rd and then north onto Second Avenue. This elevated line was torn down in 1942.

When the Stuyvesant Town–Peter Cooper Village private residential developments were constructed along the east side of First Avenue from 14th to 23rd streets in the mid-1940s, First Avenue and other streets along the perimeter of the two sites were widened in exchange for the city swapping ownership of its street areas to be closed within the developments; the segment along First Avenue was widened by 34 feet (10 m).

=== 1950s to 1990s ===
First Avenue has carried one-way traffic since June 4, 1951.

The tunnel on First Avenue adjacent to the west side of the Headquarters of the United Nations opened to traffic on April 3, 1953. This vehicular tunnel was constructed to provide a bypass for through traffic, reducing traffic volumes on the street level above the tunnel, which was intended to function as a local service road for the United Nations complex and the blocks on the west side of First Avenue. The 1,377-foot-long (420 m) tunnel runs between portals at 42nd and 47th streets. While the tunnel has always operated one-way in the northbound direction, it was originally designed to accommodate separate lanes for northbound and southbound traffic because First Avenue was a two-way street prior to the start of the tunnel's construction. Work on the project commenced on August 1, 1949 with the relocation of the subsurface utilities that were located in the path of the tunnel. The segment of First Avenue between 42nd and 48th streets was renamed "United Nations Plaza" in 1952.

Widening of the street near the south portal of the First Avenue Tunnel resulted in the demolition of tenements and a garage on the west side of the avenue between 41st and 43rd streets and the creation of two vest-pocket parks, which were later named Ralph Bunche Park and Trygve Lie Plaza in 1979 and 1998, respectively. To accommodate the sidewalk on the west side of First Avenue between 40th and 41st streets, the city constructed a pedestrian arcade in an easement below Windsor Tower in Tudor City. The base of Windsor Tower along First Avenue had been previously occupied by larger retail stores, including an auto showroom, when the sidewalk did not run through the building. The street widening for the tunnel's south portal also resulted in the removal of a 28-foot-wide (8.5 m) strip of land from the existing park on the east side of First Avenue between 41st and 42nd streets (which was later named Robert Moses Playground).

Since 1976, when the course of the New York City Marathon was modified to run through all five boroughs, First Avenue has been included as part of the marathon route. The course initially ran south on First Avenue from the Willis Avenue Bridge to 106th Street. In 1977, the marathon route was changed to run north on First Avenue from the Queensboro Bridge to the Willis Avenue Bridge to allow for increased spectator viewing, which is the same route currently used by the marathon (as of 2024).

=== 2000s to present ===
As part of the launch of Select Bus Service (SBS) on the M15 bus route in October 2010, a bus lane was designated for nearly the entire length of First Avenue (from Houston to 125th streets) for the morning and evening rush hours on weekdays and painted in a terra-cotta color. The project included the installation of offset and curbside bus lanes, bus bulbs, and sidewalk kiosks at bus stops for off-board fare payment. Prior to the implementation of SBS, the curbside lane on First Avenue between 34th and 96th streets had been designated as a bus lane from 4 p.m. to 7 p.m. on weekdays.

A protected bike lane was established along the left side of the avenue south of 50th Street in 2011. From 2019 to 2023, a temporary bike lane was established in the tunnel on First Avenue adjacent to the United Nations headquarters to provide a detour for bicyclists when the street level bike lane was closed as a security measure during the general debate of the United Nations General Assembly. A permanent bike lane in the tunnel was planned for implementation prior to the start of the United Nations General Assembly's 79th session in September 2024.

== Description ==
First Avenue passes through a variety of neighborhoods.

Starting in the south at Houston Street, First Avenue passes through the East Village, once a predominantly German and Jewish neighborhood, now a gentrified area populated mostly by hipsters and yuppies. First Avenue then runs by two large urban development projects, Stuyvesant Town and Peter Cooper Village, two middle-income housing developments that sit on what used to be the Gashouse District, an industrial area. These fill the east side of the avenue from 14th to 23rd Streets. The avenue is very wide in this segment, and includes an access road along the east side of the street.

The Margaret Cochran Corbin Campus of the VA New York Harbor Healthcare System, Bellevue Hospital, and the main campus of NYU Langone Health fill the blocks from there to 34th Street. In this section, First Avenue is also known as "Bedpan Alley" (a play on "Tin Pan Alley") because of the large number of hospitals located nearby. Between 42nd and 48th streets, the avenue runs past United Nations Headquarters. Here a local bypass, United Nations Plaza, splits from the main road, which runs through the First Avenue Tunnel, rejoining the local street at 49th Street.

Crossing under the Queensboro Bridge through a 90-foot-wide (27 m) Guastavino tile arch, First Avenue enters the Upper East Side and runs through a number of residential areas. It serves as one of the main shopping streets of the Yorkville neighborhood, historically a working class German and Hungarian neighborhood, today a wealthy enclave of upper-class residents. Another concentration of hospitals is located in the area between First Avenue and the FDR Drive from 62nd to 72nd streets, which is also locally referred to as "Bedpan Alley."

Crossing 96th Street, First Avenue runs through Spanish Harlem, a historically Puerto Rican neighborhood. Before Puerto Rican migration in the 1950s, much of this district was populated by Italians and known as "Italian Harlem". First Avenue in Italian Harlem was the site of a major open-air pushcart market in the late 19th and early 20th centuries. There is still a small Italian enclave in the Pleasant Valley district of East Harlem, between 114th and 120th Streets. The northern reaches of First Avenue, north of roughly 110th Street have also seen a significant increase in Mexican residents.

First Avenue then connects to the Willis Avenue Bridge, which crosses the Harlem River at 125th Street and connects to Willis Avenue in the Bronx. A separate segment of First Avenue runs southbound from 127th to 125th streets, and accommodates traffic from Exit 19 of the northbound Harlem River Drive destined to East Harlem.

== Transportation ==
The primary First Avenue server is the M15/M15 Select Bus Service. It runs uptown from Houston Street to East 126th Street, while downtown buses use the parallel Second Avenue.

Other bus routes include the following:

- The uptown M9 runs on it between East 20th and East 29th Streets, terminating at Bellevue Hospital at East 26th Street.
- The westbound M42 runs from East 41st to East 42nd Streets.
- The eastbound M50 runs from East 48th to East 49th Streets, then turns left to terminate.
- The westbound M57 runs from East 55th, where it originates, to East 57th Streets.
- The westbound M72 runs from East 71st to East 72nd Streets.
- The uptown M31 and eastbound M86+ Select Bus run from East 91st to East 92nd Streets. The former heads right before terminating, and the latter after.
- The eastbound M96 runs from East 96th to East 97th Streets, then turns left to terminate.
- The westbound M106 runs from East 105th to East 106th Streets.
- The eastbound M116 runs from East 116th Street to Paladino Avenue.
- The eastbound M125 runs from East 124th Street to Dr. Martin Luther King Jr. Boulevard, then heads to the Bronx via the parallel Willis Avenue Bridge.

The New York City Subway's BMT Canarsie Line has a station at 14th Street.

== In popular culture ==
- The opening scene of Ghostbusters II was filmed at the intersection of First Avenue and 77th Street.
- In the Seinfeld TV series, Kramer describes the intersection of First Avenue and 1st Street as the "nexus of the universe". This provided the name for a nightclub called the Nexus Lounge at that location.

== Gallery ==
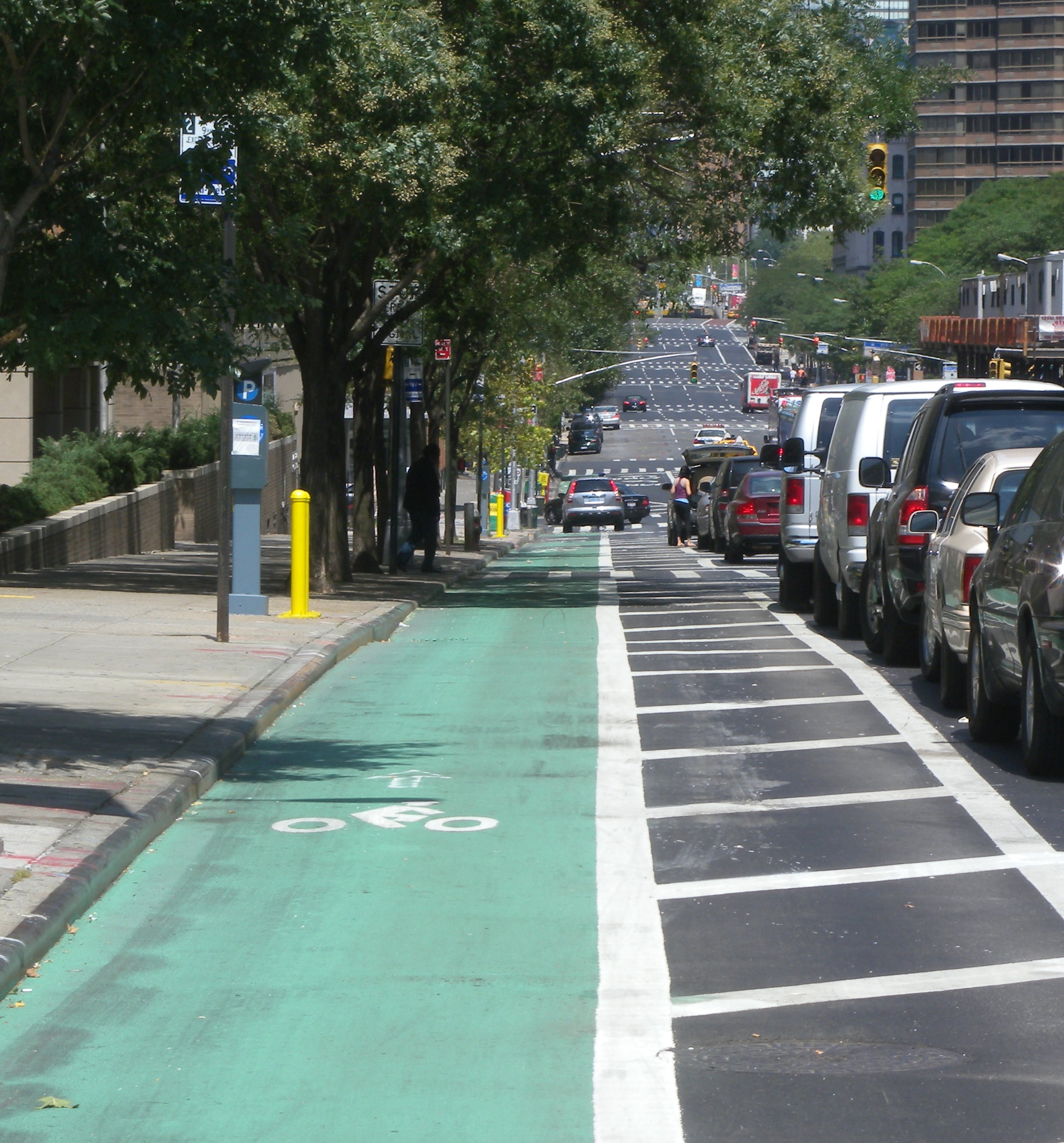
Bike lane on First Avenue

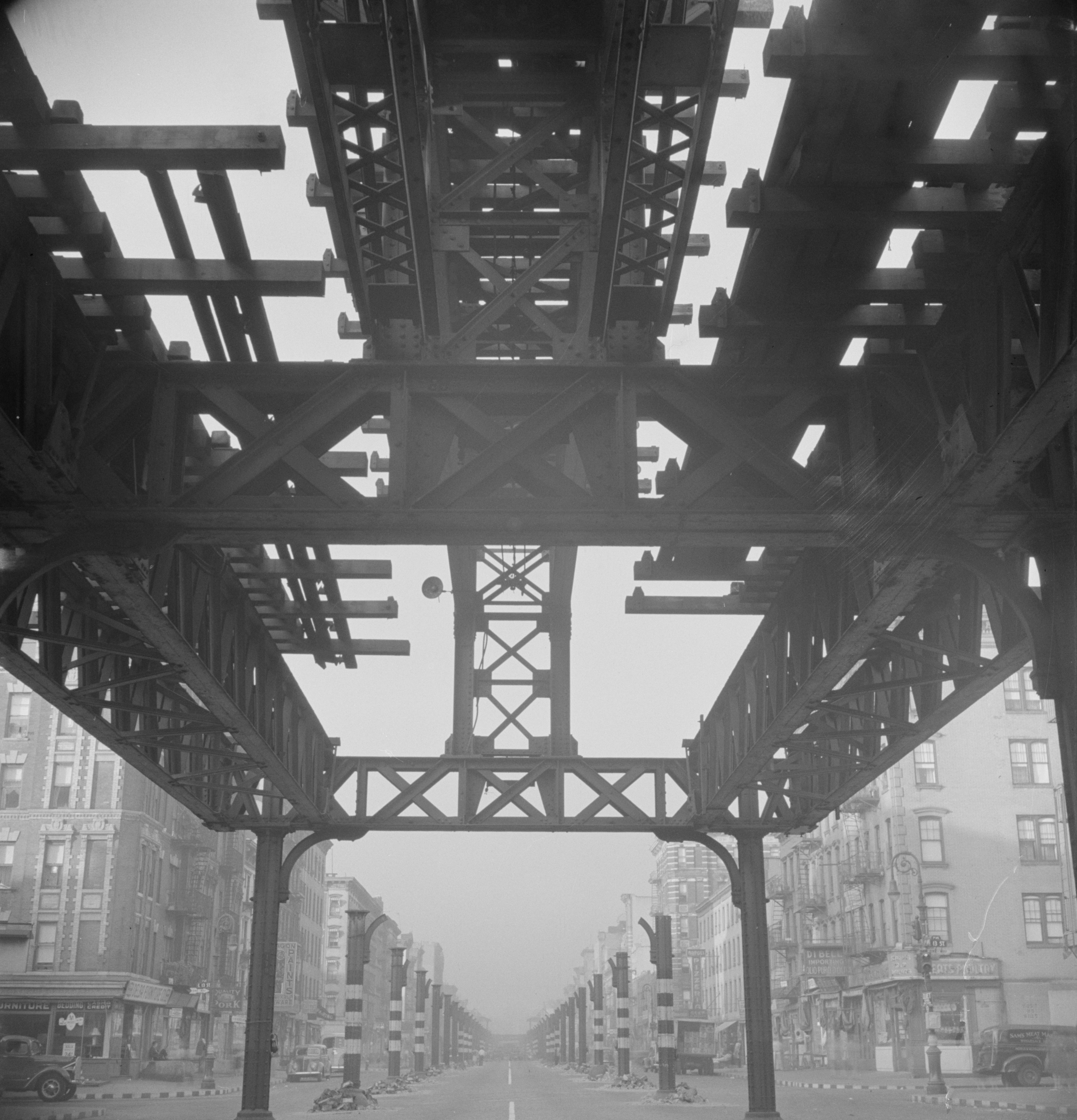
Looking south on First Avenue from 13th Street during the demolition of the Second Avenue El in September 1942

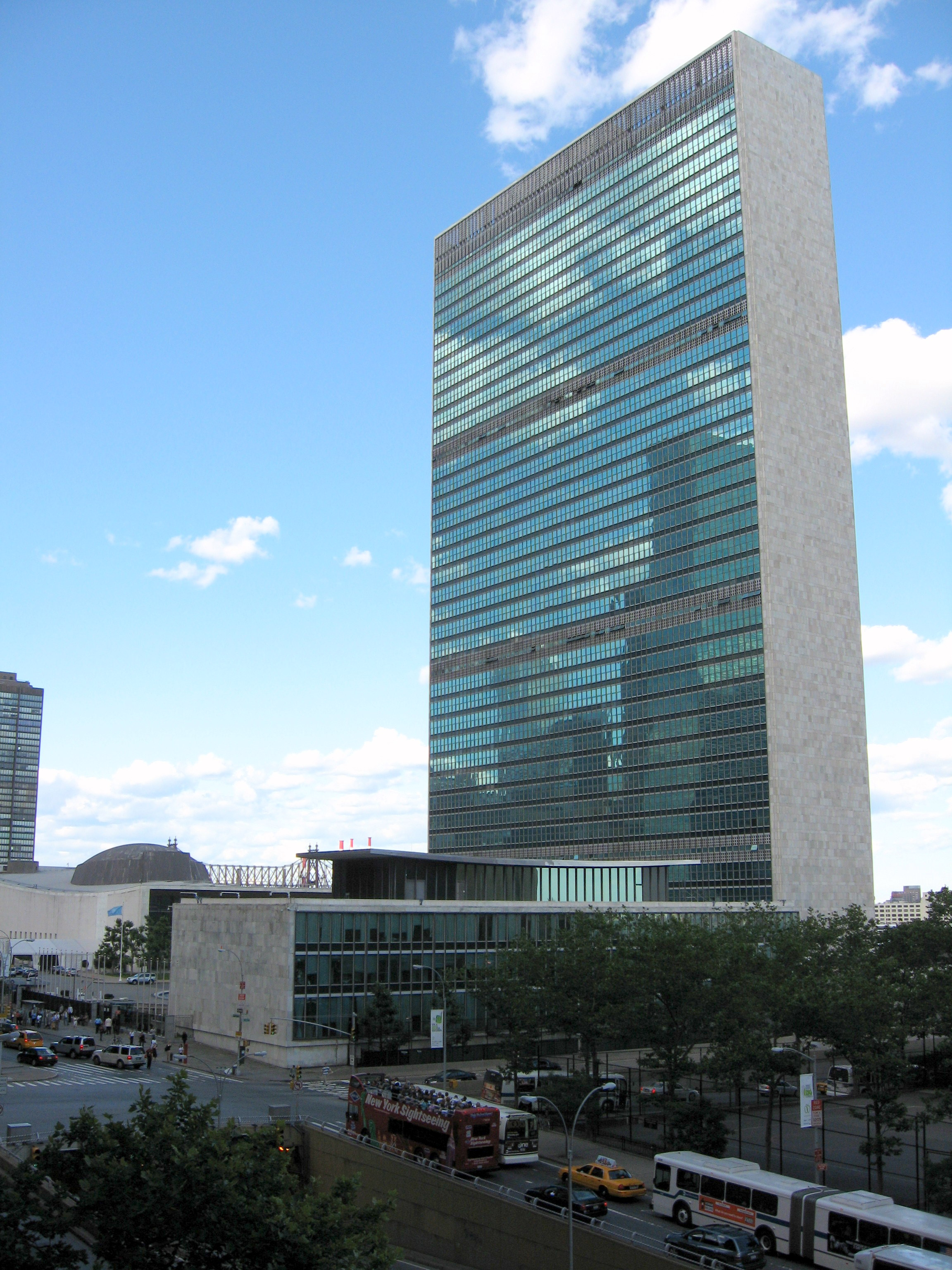
United Nations headquarters at First Avenue and 42nd Street
