= Robert Moses Playground =

Public park in Manhattan, New York

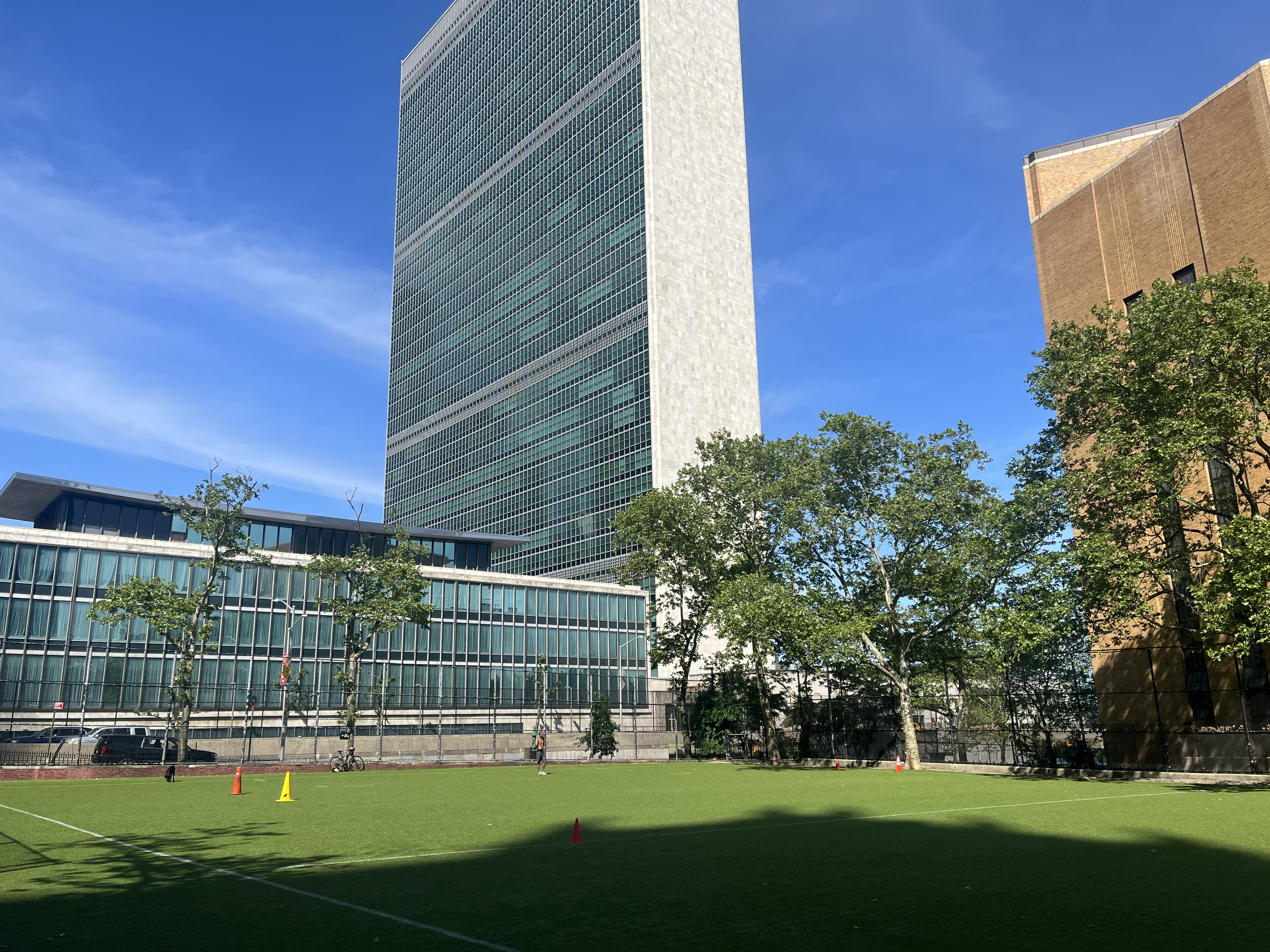
- Synthetic turf field at the park in 2023
- Interactive map of Robert Moses Playground
- Type: Urban park
- Location: Murray Hill, Manhattan, New York, US
- Coordinates: 40°44′54″N 73°58′11″W
- Area: 1.3 acres (0.53 ha)
- Opened: 1941
- Operator: New York City Department of Parks and Recreation

Robert Moses Playground is a 1.3-acre (0.53 ha) playground and park in Manhattan, New York City. It is located in the Murray Hill neighborhood on First Avenue between 41st and 42nd streets, immediately south of the headquarters of the United Nations. The park is named for New York's "master builder" Robert Moses, the former head of the Triborough Bridge and Tunnel Authority (which donated the land for the playground as part of the construction of the Queens–Midtown Tunnel), who later advocated to save the park when a skyscraper was proposed on the site in the early 1980s.

== History ==
=== Establishment of park ===
The block the park is located on was originally obtained from Consolidated Edison in 1937 as part of the Queens–Midtown Tunnel construction. Land for public park purposes was subsequently donated to the city in exchange for the taking of a portion of St. Gabriel's Park for an approach roadway providing access to the tunnel. The park itself was completed in 1941 and shares the block with the large ventilation building for the tunnel. Designed by the Department of Parks and constructed by the Works Progress Administration, the new park included a free play area on the west end of the block for roller skating and softball. A passageway on the north side of the ventilation building led to a 100-by-200-foot (30 by 61 m) paved area at the east end of the block with a comfort station and courts for basketball, handball, horseshoes, paddle tennis, and volleyball. Retaining walls needed to be constructed throughout the park due to the change in grade along the block, which sloped down from First Avenue to the East River Drive.

To accommodate the construction of the south portal for the tunnel that runs on First Avenue adjacent to the headquarters of the United Nations (UN), a 28-foot-wide (8.5 m) strip of land was removed from the western edge of the park to widen First Avenue in the late 1940s (the street widening also resulted in the establishment of two new parks on the west side of First Avenue between 41st and 43rd streets, which are now named Trygve Lie Plaza and Ralph Bunche Park).

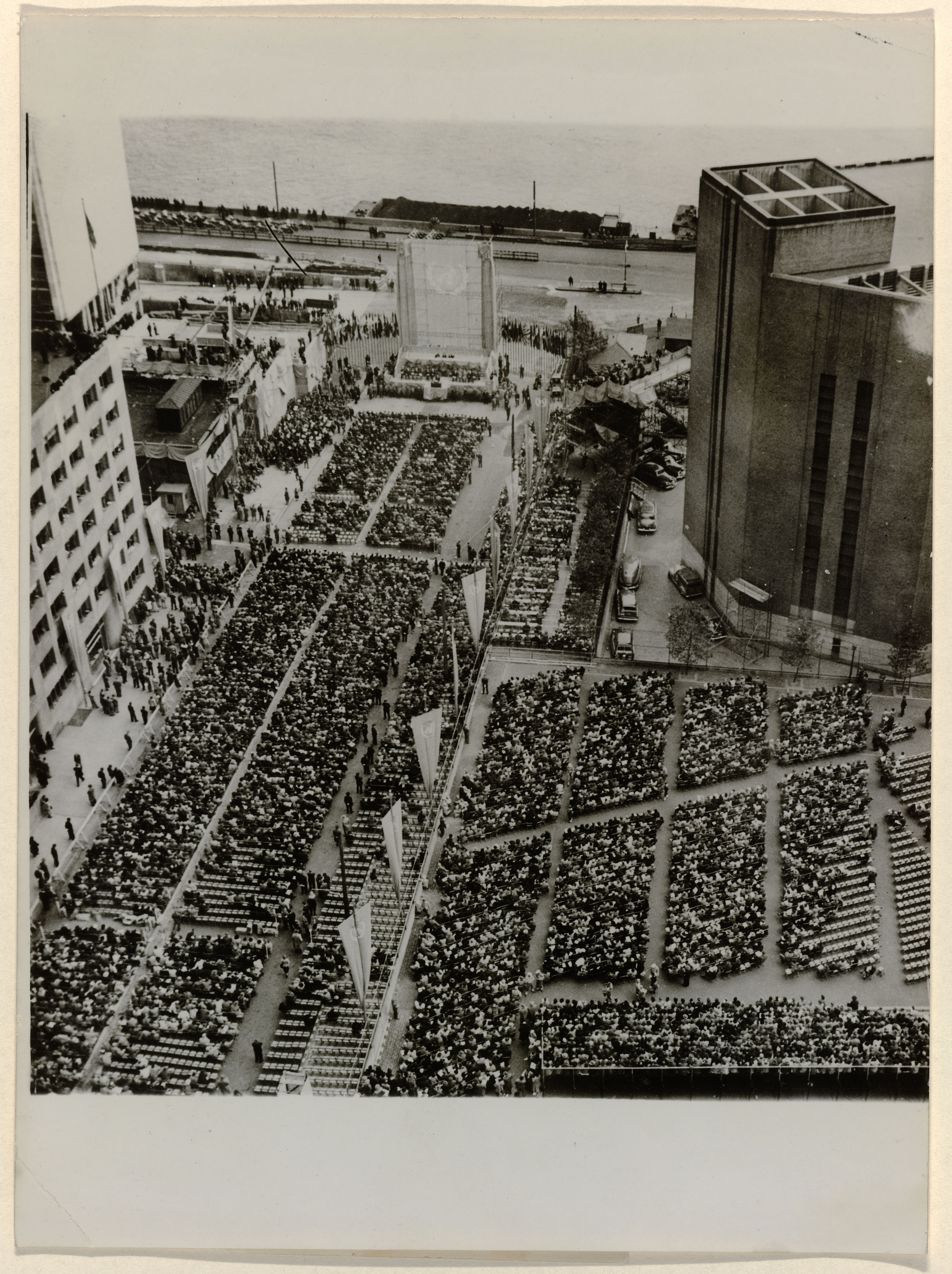
View of 42nd Street and the park at the 1949 UN dedication ceremony

On October 24, 1949, United Nations Day, the park was used to accommodate seating for an outdoor session of the United Nations General Assembly, which was held at the foot of 42nd Street and included a ceremony to dedicate the cornerstone of the UN's new headquarters. The event drew a total of 16,000 attendees, including 8,000 seated guests and 8,000 other onlookers.

The playground was depicted in the 1963 drama movie Love with the Proper Stranger in the scenes where Rocky and Angie visit his parents by the basketball court near the FDR Drive and then run away from her brothers, passing through the paved area along First Avenue.

=== Naming and renovations ===
A resolution to name the park after Robert Moses was introduced to the City Council by Councilman Robert J. Dryfoos and Council Majority Leader Thomas J. Cuite in August 1981. A bill naming the park after Moses was signed into law by New York City Mayor Ed Koch on January 27, 1982, after the City Council had voted to name the park after him earlier that month. Moses had advocated to save the asphalt playground on the western portion of the park from the development of a 45-story skyscraper on the site a few months before his death on July 29, 1981. The park was officially dedicated as the Robert Moses Playground at a ceremony held on March 28, 1982, which was preceded by a parade on roller skates from Moses' former residence at 20 East 46th Street to the park and followed by a roller hockey game.

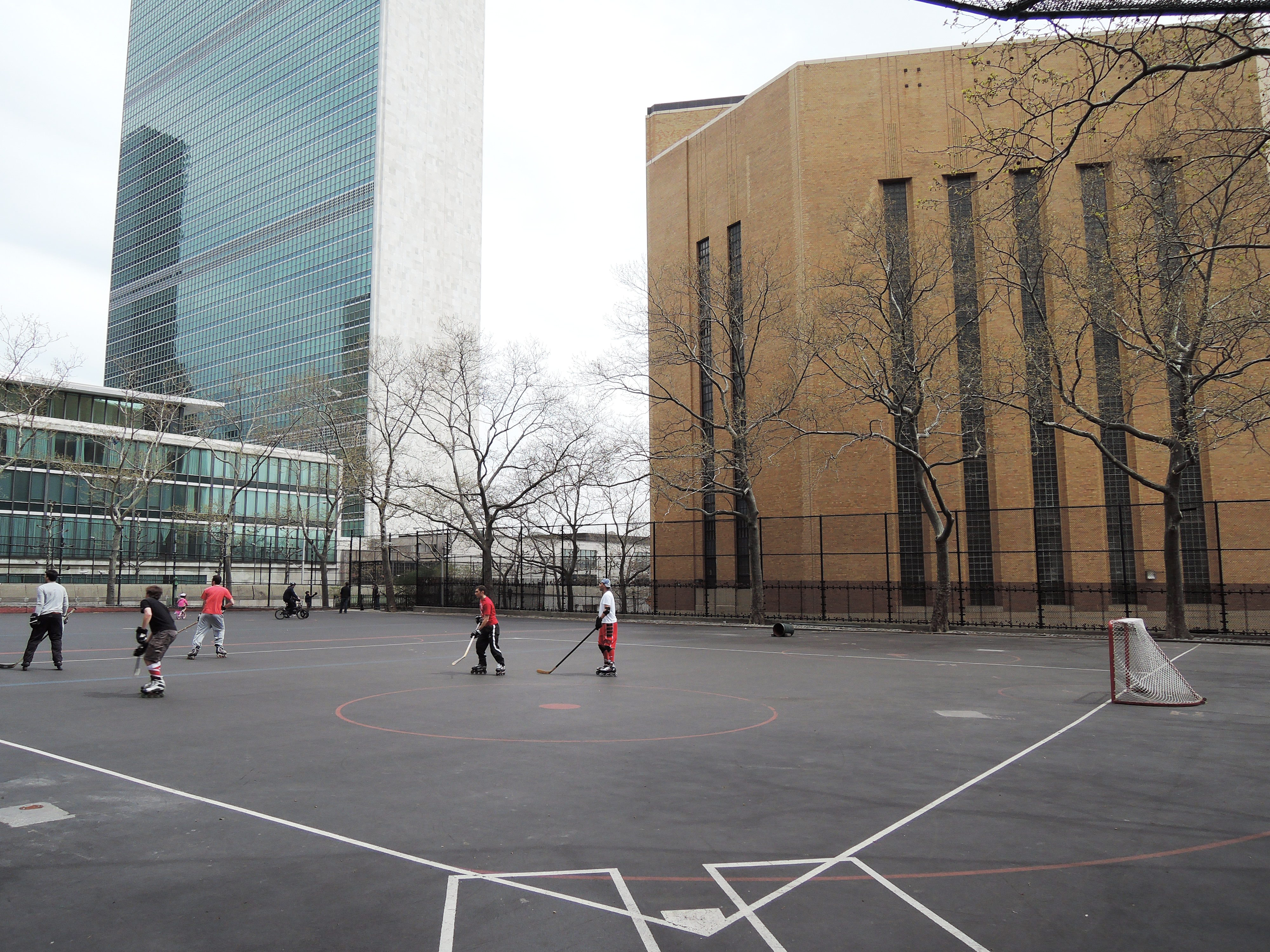
Roller hockey players at the asphalt playground in 2013

The asphalt playground on the west side of the park was often used for roller hockey, and the East End Hockey Association had been organizing games at the site since 1972. Games were held on weekends from October to May. By the early 1980s, the association was considered to be the best and most organized roller hockey league in Manhattan, having 11 teams and more than 200 players. After about $200,000 was spent to resurface the pavement in 1993, it was considered to be one of the best locations for roller hockey in the United States. In addition to roller hockey, the asphalt area was also used by children learning how to ride bicycles. The asphalt playground was subsequently replaced by a synthetic turf field in July 2021 to improve existing parks due to the temporary loss of park space during construction of the city's East Side Coastal Resiliency project.

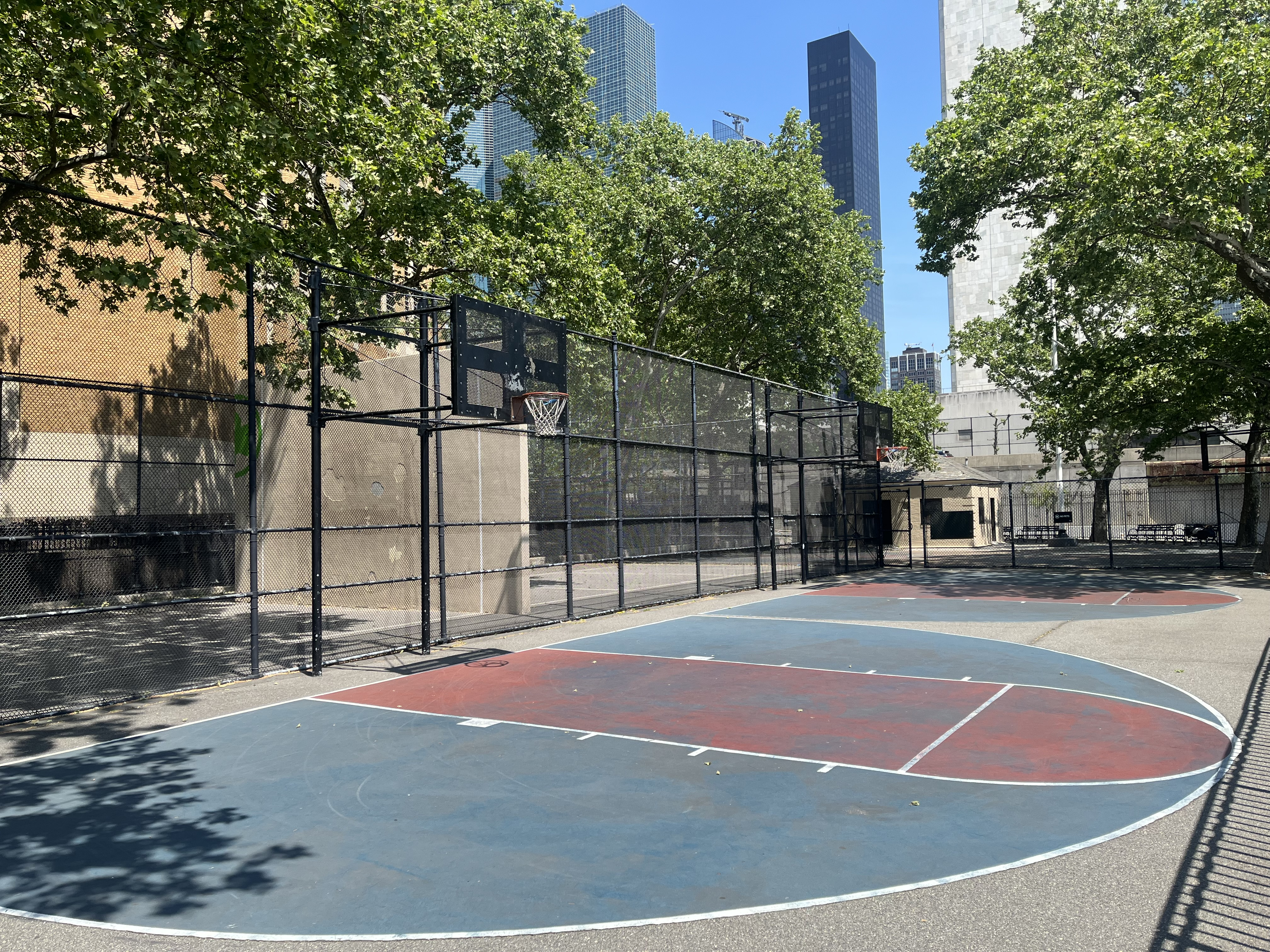
Basketball and handball courts at the eastern side of the park

A renovation of the playground on the eastern side of the park was completed in 1998 and included the addition of Art Deco silhouettes of a dozen of Moses' projects along the fence. When New York City Art Commission president Reba White Williams resigned in December 1998, she pointed out that the playground proposal was one of several projects of the New York City Department of Parks and Recreation that had not been brought before the commission, which didn't find out about the project until it appeared in The New York Times.

== Land reclamation ==
There have been four attempts to take the park's land for building projects, three of which have been associated with expansion of the UN.

=== 1960s proposal ===
By the late 1960s, the UN was facing overcrowding at its headquarters complex and was leasing office space in other nearby buildings, but intended to build a new office building to the south of its present site on the block between 41st and 42nd streets. Near the end of 1969, plans were developed for an eight-story office building that would occupy nearly the entire block occupied by the playground, wrapping around the tunnel's ventilation building, and include a bridge across 42nd Street to connect with the remainder of the UN complex. To offset the loss of the playground, a new 3-acre (1.2 ha) park was to be constructed on pilings above the East River from 38th to 43rd streets, with the northern portion reserved for the use of the UN staff and the southern portion open to the public. Additional office space for the UN was eventually added across from its complex on the west side of First Avenue at One United Nations Plaza and Two United Nations Plaza, which were completed in 1975 and 1983, respectively.

=== Late 1970s and early 1980s proposal ===
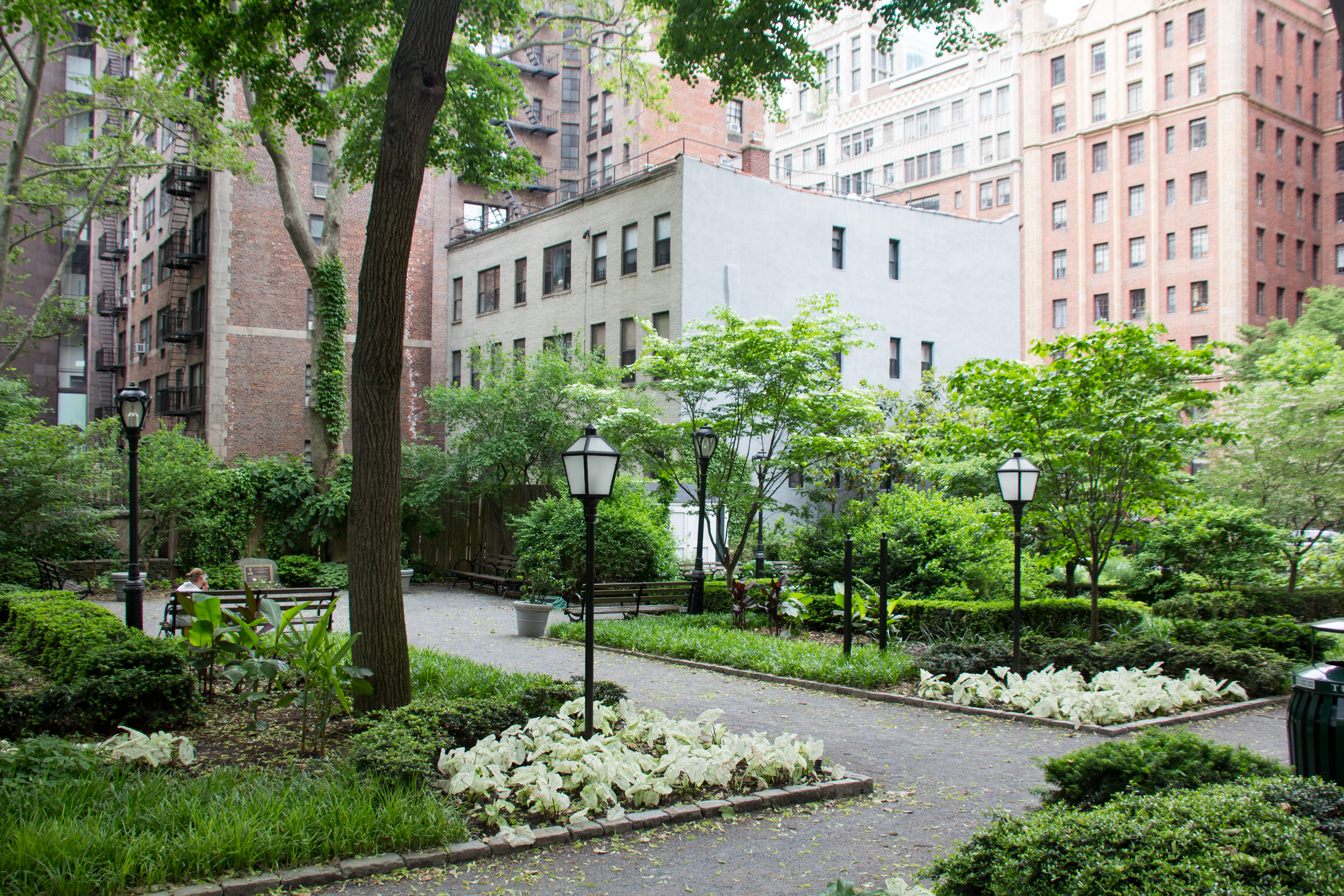
A private park in Tudor City, part of Tudor City Greens

In 1979, a proposal was made by the city to swap the western portion of the park's land with private parks in Tudor City, enabling Harry Helmsley to construct a skyscraper on the site in exchange for converting the private parks in Tudor City into public parks (which Helmsley had planned to develop with buildings). Helmsley had previously proposed a similar type of land swap to build a 50-story apartment building on the city-owned park at the northwest corner of First Avenue and 42nd Street (Ralph Bunche Park), but that plan ran into opposition from community groups and elected officials. The subsequent proposal was approved by the City Planning Commission but was opposed by a number of groups, including the East End Hockey Association, which had gained the support of Robert Moses in their fight to save the park. Although the proposal was initially supported by Mayor Ed Koch, he changed his mind when appraisals showed that the public parkland was more valuable than the private parks in Tudor City. The land swap proposal was vetoed by the Board of Estimate in 1981.

=== 2000s proposal ===
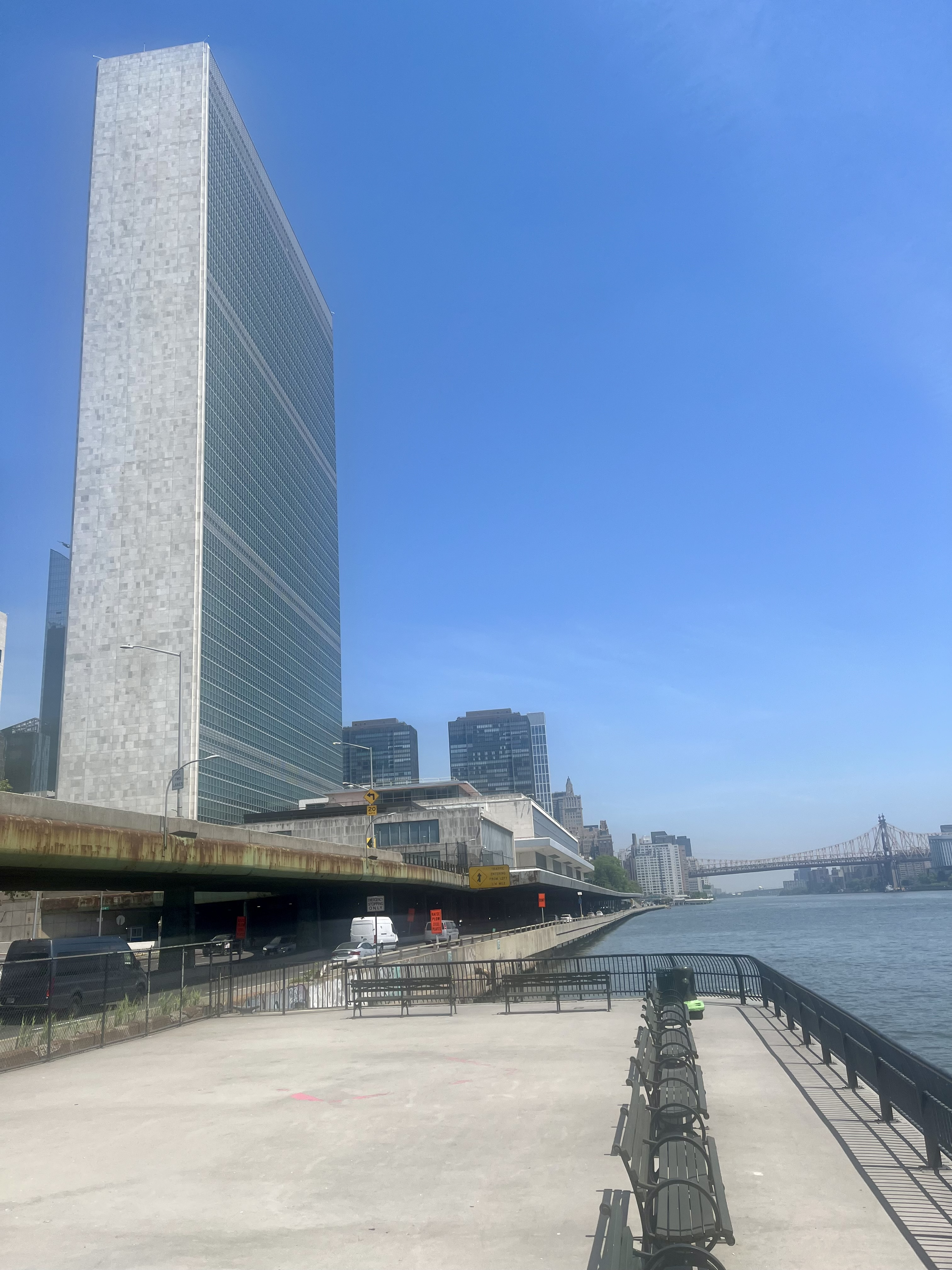
View of East River Greenway gap alongside the UN campus in 2026

In 2002, a proposal was made by the city to allow for the UN to construct a skyscraper on the western portion of the park's land that would be connected to its existing campus via a tunnel under 42nd Street. The new building would have been used as swing space during renovation of the Secretariat Building and would have subsequently been used by the UN as additional office space. The loss of parkland was proposed to be offset by the construction of a new park in the form of an expansion of the East River Greenway alongside the UN campus. This proposal was rejected by the New York State Legislature in 2005.

=== 2010s proposal ===
The most recent proposal to take the park's land for a building was raised by the UN in June 2010. Under this deal, the city would then expand the nearby East River Greenway to compensate for the loss of this park. On December 8, 2010, Manhattan Community Board 6 gave their support to this plan, providing that the esplanade was expanded. In March 2011, the city gave approval to move ahead with a feasibility study for this project as part of Mayor Bloomberg's Vision 2020: New York City Comprehensive Waterfront Plan. If agreed by the city and the heads of both houses of the New York State Legislature, the United Nations Development Corporation (UNDC) could begin preliminary planning for a new office tower, which could be no taller than the 505-foot (154 m) tall Secretariat Building. The UN would pay the city at least $65 million for the park. The plan was opposed by some residents of Tudor City, which is across the street from the park.

On October 5, 2011, the city and state reached an agreement to use the western portion of Robert Moses Playground for an expansion of the UN campus. In exchange, the UNDC would pay $73 million to fund the development of the East River esplanade between 38th and 60th streets. To make up for the loss of parkland, the city would convert Asser Levy Place into parkland.

As of 2021, the new tower was no longer being considered as an option by the UN, which also reneged on its previous promise to fund the extension of the greenway.
