= Ralph Bunche Park =

Public park in Manhattan, New York

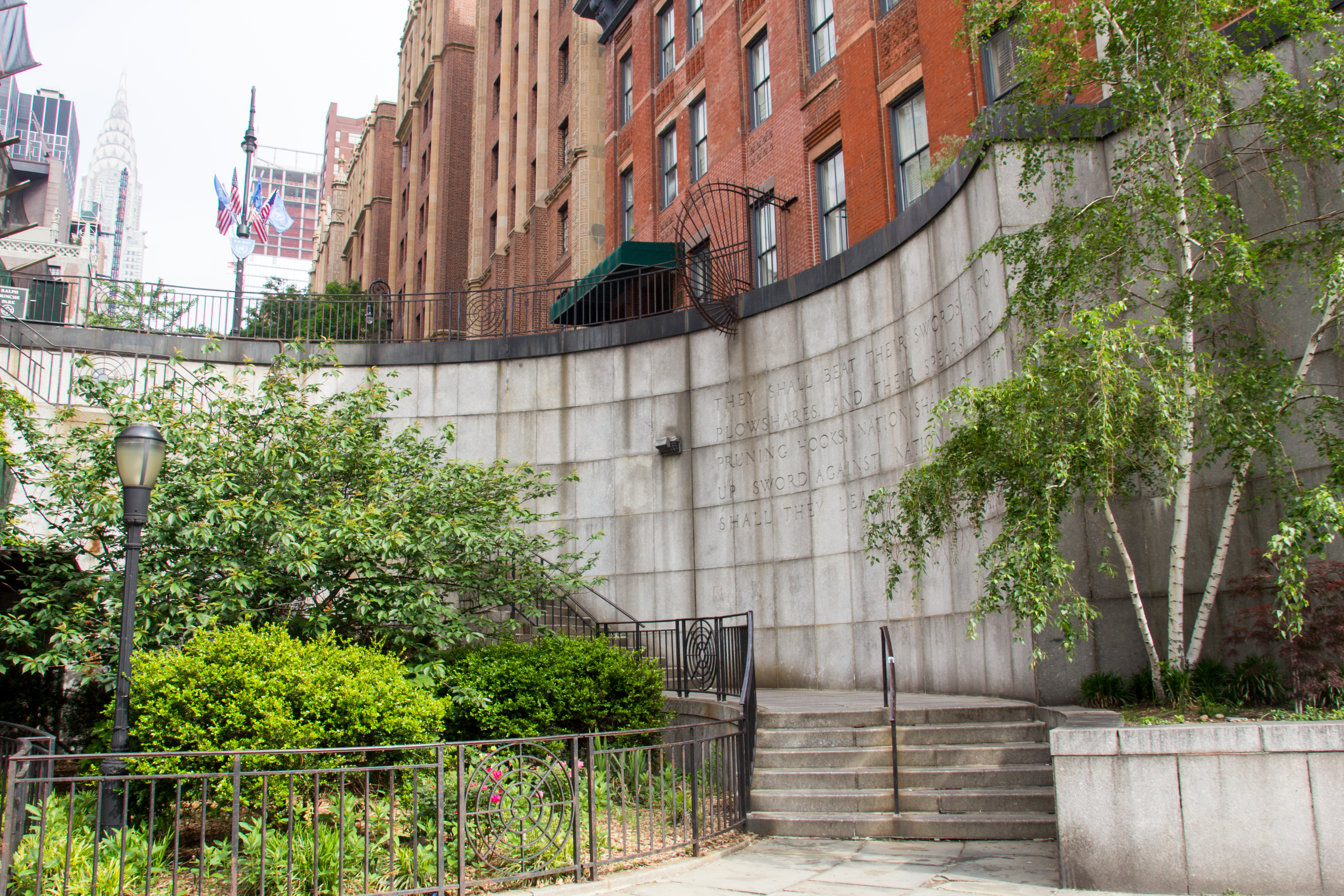
- Isaiah Wall and Sharansky Steps in 2017
- Interactive map of Ralph Bunche Park
- Type: Urban park
- Location: Turtle Bay, Manhattan, New York, US
- Coordinates: 40°44′57.5″N 73°58′11″W
- Area: 0.23 acres (0.09 ha)
- Designated: 1947
- Operator: New York City Department of Parks and Recreation

Ralph Bunche Park is a small municipal public park in the Turtle Bay neighborhood of New York City, on the west side of First Avenue between 42nd and 43rd Streets. Originally referred to as United Nations Plaza Park, it was named in 1979 for Ralph Bunche, the first African-American to win the Nobel Peace Prize. The park contains four monuments: a sculpture dedicated to Ralph Bunche, a wall inscribed with a biblical quotation from the prophet Isaiah, a staircase named in honor of Natan Sharansky, and a plaque commemorating Bayard Rustin.

The park was dedicated as the city's first Peace Park in 1985. Because of its proximity to the United Nations headquarters and peace theme, the site is a popular site for demonstrations and rallies for peace and other international issues; however, it cannot accommodate major gatherings as it covers less than one-quarter of an acre (1,000 m^{2}).

== History ==
=== 1940s to 1970s ===
The site of the park, which is located on the west side of First Avenue between 42nd and 43rd streets (across from the United Nations headquarters), was previously occupied by a three-story garage that abutted the east side of the base of Prospect Tower in Tudor City. The new parkland, including the property for Trygve Lie Plaza on the opposite side of 42nd Street, was acquired by the city as part of the widening of First Avenue to accommodate the United Nations headquarters, which included the construction of the vehicular tunnel that runs under First Avenue from 42nd to 48th streets.

Construction of a park at this location was opposed by William Zeckendorf and his real estate development firm Webb & Knapp, which had planned to construct an airline terminal building on a portion of the block, including the site of the Hospital for Special Surgery (which was planning to move to a new building on the Upper East Side). Zeckendorf called the plans to construct a 50-foot-wide (15 m) park that could not be extended due to the 30-foot-high (9.1 m) cliff supporting the Tudor City buildings "a flagrant misuse of City funds." Webb & Knapp owned the property on First Avenue and planned to use the site as part of the airline terminal to provide access for limousines traveling to the terminal and the Queens–Midtown Tunnel, and intended to connect it to a large building on Second Avenue via a tunnel under Tudor City. During that time period, many airlines provided ticketing, baggage, and airport ground transportation services at remote terminals located in Manhattan, including the 42nd Street Airlines Terminal that opened in 1941 across from Grand Central Terminal.

The boundaries of the park were outlined on a map as early as 1947; the land lot has an area of 10,040 square feet (0.23 acres; 0.09 ha), with a frontage of 200.83 feet (61.2 m) and a depth of 50 feet (15.2 m). The stretch of First Avenue above the tunnel and adjacent to the park was renamed "United Nations Plaza" in 1952.

The granite spiral staircase in the park's northwest corner leads to 43rd Street and the Tudor City apartments. It was designed by the firm of Andrews & Clark and replaced a set of stairs that had previously connected Tudor City with First Avenue at 43rd Street. The staircase was built and dedicated in 1948 during construction of the U.N. headquarters and has the famous quotation from Isaiah 2:4: "They shall beat their swords into plowshares, and their spears into pruning hooks; nation shall not lift up sword against nation, neither shall they learn war any more" incised into its wall. Known as the Isaiah Wall, it was rededicated in 1975 and had the name "Isaiah" added under the final word.

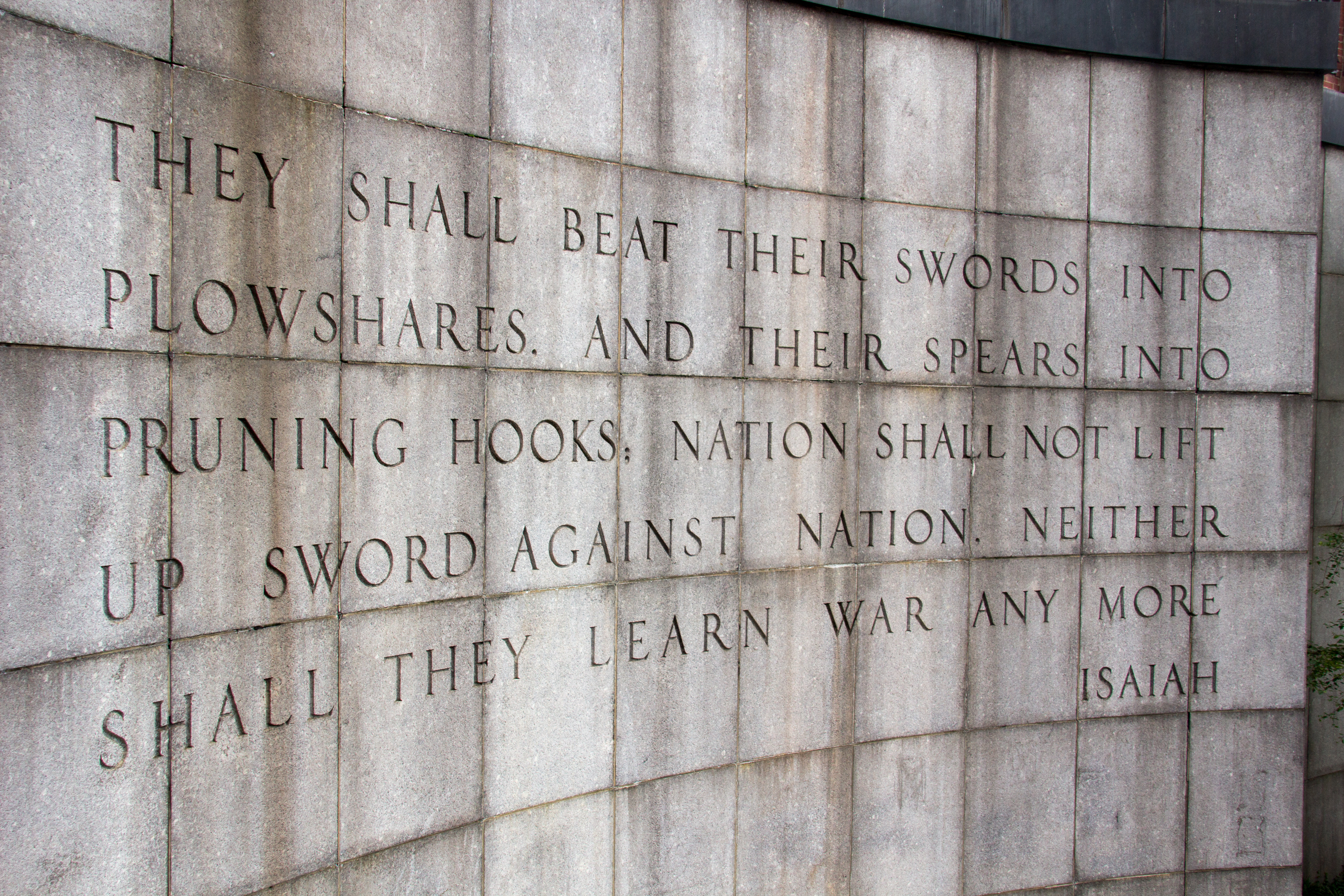
A biblical quotation from Isaiah is inscribed on the wall on the north side of the park

The effort to add the word "Isaiah" to the wall was led by Sam Brown, a former official of the American Jewish Congress. Brown wrote letters to New York City Mayor Abraham Beame and United Nations Secretary-General Kurt Waldheim in May 1974 about the omission and was ultimately directed to the city's Parks, Recreation & Cultural Affairs Administration, which said the inscription could be added if he paid for it because city funds for the work were not available. Brown enlisted the assistance of the Indiana Jewish Post and Opinion to help raise funds for the project from its readers in the beginning of 1975. The inscription was added in consultation with the city's Landmarks Preservation Commission. The original inscription consisted of 8-inch-high (20 cm) letters that had been carved into the granite by the A. Ottavino Corporation; the same firm added "Isaiah" to the inscription in September 1975.

On February 5, 1976, the New York City Council Committee on Parks, Recreation and Cultural Affairs passed a bill to name the park "Zion Square." The legislation was sponsored by Councilman Henry Stern and came as a response to United Nations General Assembly Resolution 3379 that had been recently adopted by the international organization. Opponents of the name change included M. T. Mehdi and Alfred Lilienthal. An editorial in The New York Times called the bill to name the park "an inane response." The following week, it was disclosed that the city's Art Commission and Parks, Recreation & Cultural Affairs Administration had approved the site in 1973 as the location for a monument to Ralph Bunche, which came as a surprise to both those that supported and opposed naming the park "Zion Square." Officially naming the park would have required approval by the full city council and mayor; the committee never brought the bill to the full city council for a vote.

Meanwhile, an international committee was formed to raise funds for the monument to Ralph Bunche planned for the park, which was then referred to as "United Nations Plaza Park." U.S. Representative Charles Rangel introduced legislation authorizing the appropriation of funds for the monument in 1978; he subsequently introduced a bill authorizing appropriations for the monument to be used by the Phelps Stokes Fund, which was passed by Congress and signed into law in 1980. The City Council's Committee on Parks, Recreation and Cultural Affairs ended up passing a bill to name the park in memory of Ralph Bunche on July 30, 1979, and legislation establishing "Ralph J. Bunche Park" was signed into law by New York City Mayor Ed Koch on October 9, 1979.

In February 1979, Harry Helmsley proposed constructing a 50-story apartment building at the site, swapping ownership of the park with the city in exchange for converting the private parks in Tudor City into public parks (which Helmsley had planned to develop with buildings). The plan ran into opposition from community groups and elected officials and two months later Helmsley changed his proposal to instead swap ownership of the city-owned park at the southeast corner of First Avenue and 42nd Street (now called Robert Moses Playground) to build the proposed skyscraper.

=== 1980s to present ===
Peace Form One, a stainless-steel obelisk 50 feet (15 m) high, was erected in September 1980 in the plaza in front of the Isaiah Wall. The sculptor, Daniel LaRue Johnson, was a personal friend of Bunche and dedicated the sculpture to Bunche when the latter won a Nobel Peace Prize in 1950. The sculpture was dedicated on September 15, 1980 with a ceremony held at the United Nations General Assembly Building followed by an unveiling of a plaque near the base of the monument in the park. Dignitaries attending the event included Mrs. Ralph J. Bunche, United Nations Secretary-General Kurt Waldheim, U.S. Vice President Walter Mondale, U.S. Ambassador to the United Nations Donald McHenry, U.S. Representative Charles Rangel, U.S. Representative William Green and Mayor Ed Koch.

In 1981 the staircase adjacent to the Isaiah Wall was named the Sharansky Steps in honor of Soviet dissident Natan Sharansky. Legislation to name the staircase after Sharansky was passed by the City Council on September 24, 1981 and was signed into law by Mayor Ed Koch on October 6, 1981. Koch dedicated the staircase in a ceremony held on November 1, 1981 that was sponsored by the Greater New York Conference on Soviet Jewry and the Student Struggle for Soviet Jewry.

In February 1982, Israeli ambassador to the United Nations Yehuda Blum said that he wanted the city to consider removing the inscription on the Isaiah Wall. His request came during the debate at an emergency special session of the United Nations General Assembly that resulted in a resolution calling for a boycott of Israel following its Golan Heights Law and was followed up with a phone call to Mayor Ed Koch. Koch rejected his request, but said he would instead add a new biblical quotation to the wall that would reflect the "hypocrisy" of the United Nations. Koch changed his mind later that month and decided against adding a new inscription to the wall.

The tradition of egg balancing on the vernal equinox gained widespread publicity after urban shaman Donna Henes stood 360 eggs on their ends at the park around 11:39 p.m. on March 20, 1983. The event was attended by about a hundred people and covered in The New Yorker; staff writer William McKibben was able to get an egg to balance on his first try during the equinox but failed repeatedly when he returned to the site two days later.

Ralph Bunche Park was dedicated as the city's first Peace Park by Mayor Ed Koch on August 14, 1985, the 40th anniversary of the end of World War II. The designation was inspired by the efforts of Ploughshares, a Seattle-based organization consisting of former Peace Corps volunteers, to create a binational peace park between the United States and Soviet Union with the support of Architects/Designers/Planners for Social Responsibility. Ploughshares had asked mayors in the United States to lobby Moscow Mayor Vladimir Promyslov to provide a site for the proposed peace park in his city, and Koch decided it would be a good idea to create a peace park in New York City after he was contacted by Seattle mayor Charles Royer to help support Ploughshares' initiative.

On August 28, 1989, Mayor Ed Koch dedicated a plaque at the southern end of the park that commemorates American civil rights leader Bayard Rustin.

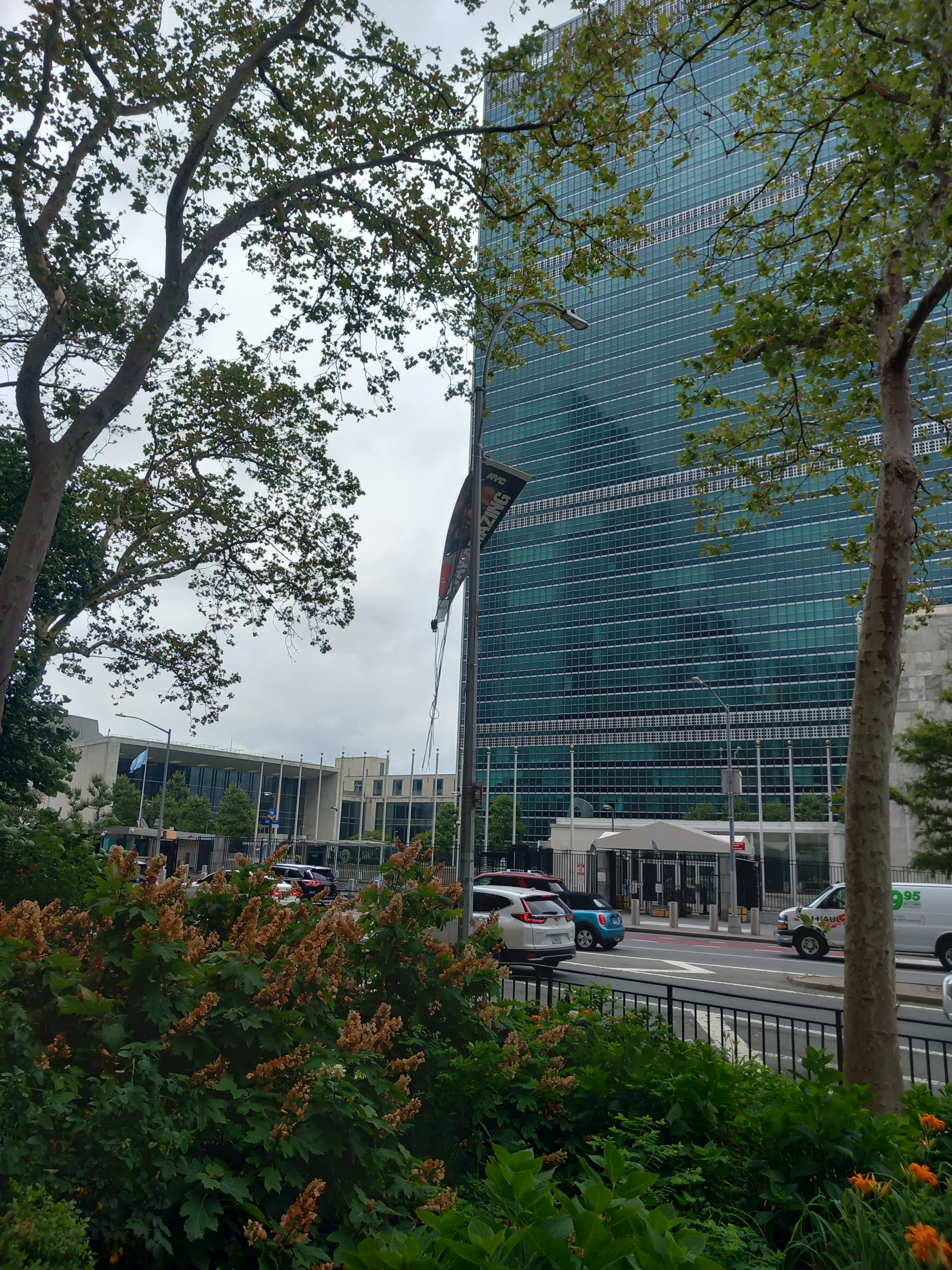
The United Nations headquarters viewed from the park in 2023

In the early to mid-1990s, the Grand Central Partnership developed plans to designate the segment of 43rd Street between First and Lexington avenues, which includes the Sharansky Steps at the north end of the park, as "United Nations Way" and make streetscape improvements along the corridor to provide an enhanced pedestrian connection between the United Nations headquarters and Grand Central Terminal. Flags of the member states of the United Nations were added to the lampposts along 43rd Street in October 1995 to mark the 50th anniversary of the international organization. The street provides access to the nearest New York City Subway station to the park, the Grand Central–42nd Street station (served by the 4, 5, 6, <6>, 7, <7>, and S trains), Metro-North Railroad at Grand Central Terminal, and the Long Island Rail Road at Grand Central Madison.

== Protests and demonstrations ==
Because of its proximity to the United Nations, the peace theme of the Isaiah Wall and Peace Form One, and Bunche's career as a peacemaker, the park is a popular site for demonstrations and rallies for peace and other international issues. The small size of the park, which covers less than one-quarter of an acre (1,000 m^{2}), cannot accommodate major gatherings of more than 50 people. It is also closed as a security measure during the general debate of the United Nations General Assembly. Larger events are accommodated at Dag Hammarskjöld Plaza, the only other location near the United Nations headquarters where protests and demonstrations with sound are permitted.
