= Headquarters of the United Nations =

Group of buildings in New York City

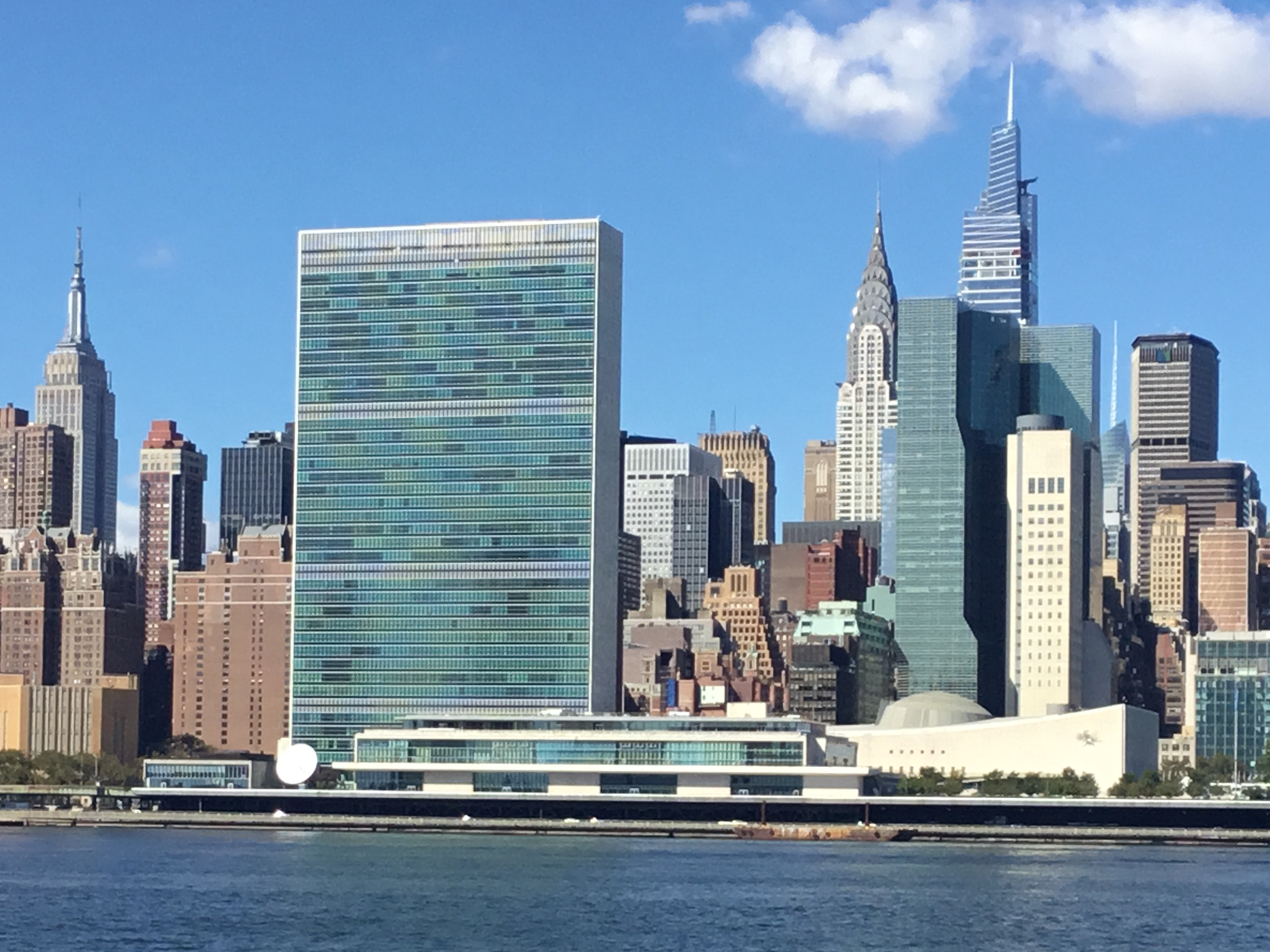
- View of the complex from Long Island City in 2021; from left to right: the Secretariat, Conference, and General Assembly buildings
- Alternative names: Arabic: مقر الأمم المتحدة; Chinese: 联合国总部大楼; French: Siège des Nations unies; Russian: Штаб-квартира Организации Объединённых Наций; Spanish: Sede de las Naciones Unidas

General information
- Architectural style: Modern architecture
- Location: 760 United Nations Plaza; Manhattan, New York, U.S. (international zone)
- Coordinates: 40°44′58″N 73°58′5″W
- Groundbreaking: September 14, 1948; 78 years ago
- Construction started: 1948; 78 years ago
- Completed: October 9, 1952; 74 years ago
- Cost: US$65 million (equivalent to $630 million in 2025)
- Owner: United Nations

Height
- Height: 510 feet (155.3 m)

Technical details
- Floor count: 39

Design and construction
- Architect: Board of designers mediated by Harrison & Abramovitz
- Main contractor: Fuller, Turner, Slattery, and Walsh

The headquarters of the United Nations (UN) is on 17 to 18 acres (6.9 to 7.3 ha) of grounds in the Turtle Bay neighborhood of Midtown Manhattan in New York City, United States. It borders First Avenue to the west, 42nd Street to the south, 48th Street to the north, and the East River to the east. Completed in 1952, the complex consists of several structures, including the Secretariat, Conference, and General Assembly buildings, and the Dag Hammarskjöld Library. The complex was designed by a board of architects led by Wallace Harrison and built by the architectural firm Harrison & Abramovitz, with final projects developed by Oscar Niemeyer and Le Corbusier. The term Turtle Bay is occasionally used as a metonym for the UN headquarters or United Nations as a whole.

The headquarters holds the seats of the principal organs of the UN, including the General Assembly and the Security Council, but excluding the International Court of Justice, which is seated in The Hague. The United Nations has three additional subsidiary regional headquarters or headquarters districts. These were opened in Geneva (Switzerland) in 1946, Vienna (Austria) in 1980, and Nairobi (Kenya) in 1996. These adjunct offices help represent UN interests, facilitate diplomatic activities, and enjoy certain extraterritorial privileges, but do not contain the seats of major organs.

Although the structure is physically situated in the United States, the land occupied by the UN headquarters and spaces of buildings it rents are under the sole administration of the UN. They are technically extraterritorial through a treaty agreement with the U.S. government. However, in exchange for local police, fire protection, and other services, the United Nations agrees to acknowledge most local, state, and federal laws.

None of the UN's 15 specialized agencies, such as UNESCO, are located at the headquarters. However, some autonomous subsidiary organs, such as UNICEF, are based at the UN's headquarters in New York City.

== History ==
=== Planning ===
==== Site ====
The headquarters of the United Nations occupies a site beside the East River between 42nd and 48th Streets, on between 17 and 18 acres (6.9 and 7.3 ha) (Note: Sources vary on whether the site is 17 acres (6.9 ha) or 18 acres (7.3 ha).) of land purchased from the real estate developer William Zeckendorf Sr. At the time, the site was part of Turtle Bay, which contained slaughterhouses and tenement buildings, as well as the original Eberhard Faber Pencil Factory and, by the 1910s, a gas company building on the site of the current UN headquarters. The development of Sutton Place and Beekman Place, north of the current UN site, came in the 1920s. A yacht club on the site was proposed in 1925, but it proved to be too expensive.

In 1946, Zeckendorf purchased the land with the intention to create a futuristic, self-contained city called "X City" on the site. This complex was to contain an office building and a hotel, each 57 stories tall, and an entertainment complex between them. X City would have also had smaller apartment and office towers. However, the US$8.5 million ($88 million in 2024) for X City never materialized, and Nelson Rockefeller purchased an option for Zeckendorf's waterfront land in Turtle Bay. The purchase was funded by Nelson's father, John D. Rockefeller Jr. The Rockefeller family owned the Tudor City Apartments across First Avenue from the Zeckendorf site. The city, in turn, spent $5 million ($52 million in 2024) on clearing the land. Rockefeller donated the site to the UN in December 1946. The UN accepted this donation, despite the objections of several prominent architects such as Le Corbusier.

==== Design ====
Map of the United Nations headquarters. The green rectangle is the Dag Hammarskjöld Library, the purple rectangle is the Secretariat, the blue trapezoid is the Conference Building, and the medium gray shape is the General Assembly Building.

While the United Nations had dreamed of constructing an independent city for its new world capital, multiple obstacles soon forced the organization to downsize its plans. They ultimately decided to build on Rockefeller's East River plot, since the land was free and the land's owners were well known. The diminutive site on the East River necessitated a Rockefeller Center–type vertical complex, thus, it was a given that the Secretariat would be housed in a tall office tower. During daily meetings from February to June 1947, the collaborative team produced at least 45 designs and variations. Rather than hold a competition for the design of the facilities for the headquarters, the UN decided to commission a multinational team of leading architects to collaborate on the design. Wallace K. Harrison was named as Director of Planning, and a Board of Design Consultants was composed of architects, planners and engineers nominated by member governments. The board consisted of N. D. Bassov (Soviet Union), Gaston Brunfaut (Belgium), Ernest Cormier (Canada), Le Corbusier (France), Liang Seu-cheng (China), Sven Markelius (Sweden), Oscar Niemeyer (Brazil), Howard Robertson (United Kingdom), Garnet Argyle Soilleux (Australia), and Julio Vilamajó (Uruguay). The design process for the United Nations headquarters formally began in February 1947.

Niemeyer met with Corbusier at the latter's request shortly after the former arrived in New York City. Corbusier had already been lobbying hard to promote his own scheme 23, and thus, requested that Niemeyer not submit a design, lest he further confuse the contentious meetings of the Board of Design. Instead, Corbusier asked the younger architect Niemeyer to assist him with his project. Niemeyer began to absent himself from the meetings. Only after Wallace Harrison and Max Abramovitz repeatedly pressed him to participate did Niemeyer agree to submit his own project. Niemeyer's project 32 was finally chosen, but as opposed to Corbusier's project 23, which consisted of one building containing both the Assembly Hall and the councils in the center of the site (as it was hierarchically the most important building), Niemeyer's plan split the councils from the Assembly Hall, locating the first alongside the river, and the second on the right side of the secretariat. This would not split the site, but on the contrary, would create a large civic square.

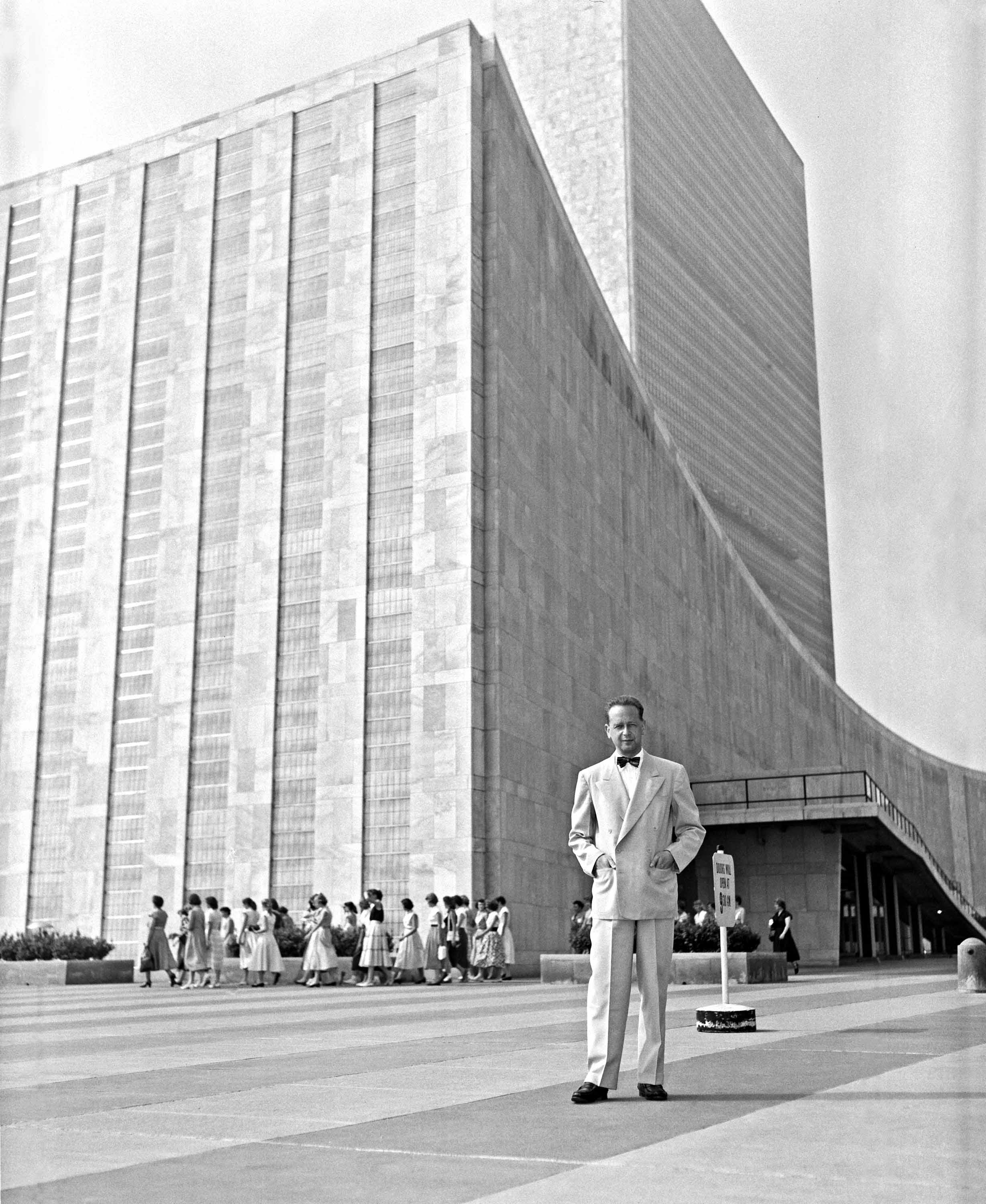
UN Secretary-General Dag Hammarskjöld in front of the General Assembly Building (1950s)

After much discussion, Harrison, who coordinated the meetings, determined that a design based on Niemeyer's Project 32 and Le Corbusier's Project 23 would be developed for the final project. Le Corbusier's Project 23 consisted of a large block containing both the Assembly Hall and the Council Chambers near the center of the site with the Secretariat tower emerging as a slab from the south. Niemeyer's plan was closer to that constructed, with a distinctive General Assembly Building, a long low horizontal block housing the other meeting rooms, and a tall tower for the Secretariat. The Board of Design presented their final plans for the United Nations headquarters in May 1947. The plans called for a 45-story Secretariat tower at the south end of the site, a 30-story office building at the north end, and several low-rise structures (including the General Assembly Building) in between. The complex, as built, repositioned Niemeyer's General Assembly building to the north of this tripartite composition. This plan included a public plaza as well. The UN headquarters was originally proposed alongside a grand boulevard leading eastward from Third Avenue or Lexington Avenue, between 46th Street to the south and 49th Street to the north. These plans were eventually downsized into Dag Hammarskjöld Plaza, a small plaza on the south side of 47th Street east of Second Avenue.

Wallace Harrison's assistant, architect George Dudley, later stated: "It literally took our breath away to see the simple plane of the site kept open from First Avenue to the River, only three structures on it, standing free, a fourth lying low behind them along the river's edge...[Niemeyer] also said, 'beauty will come from the buildings being in the right space!'. The comparison between Le Corbusier's heavy block and Niemeyer's startling, elegantly articulated composition seemed to me to be in everyone's mind..." Later on, Corbusier came once again to Niemeyer and asked him to reposition the Assembly Hall back to the center of the site. Such modification would destroy Niemeyer's plans for a large civic square. However, he finally decided to accept the modification; together, they submitted the scheme 23–32, which was built and is what can be seen today. Along with suggestions from the other members of the Board of Design Consultants, this was developed into project 42G. This late project was built with some reductions and other modifications.

==== Proposed alternatives ====
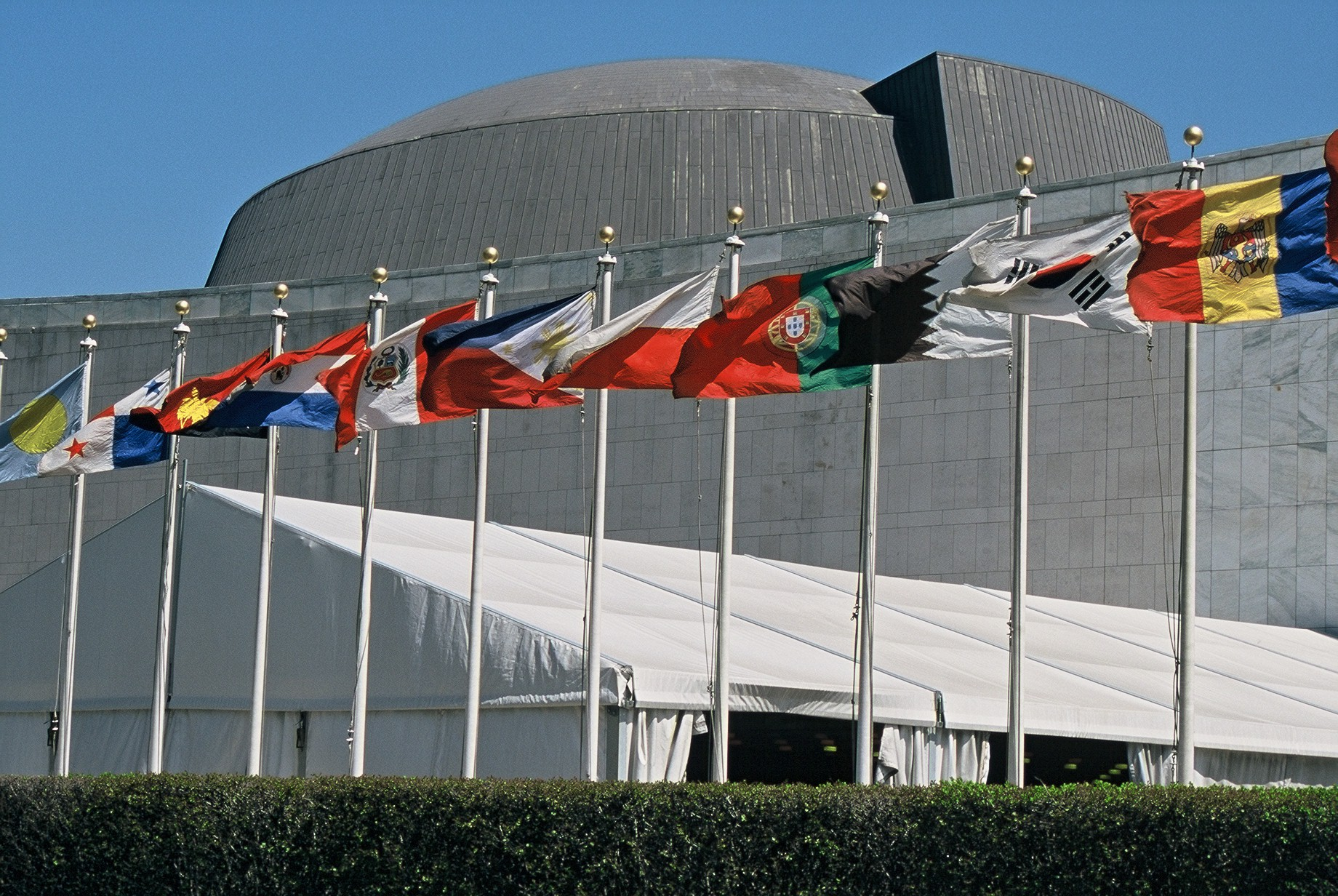
Flags of the member states, arranged in alphabetical order

Many cities vied for the honor of hosting the UN Headquarters site, before the selection of New York City. The selection of the East River site came after over a year of protracted study and consideration of many sites in the United States. A powerful faction among the delegates advocated returning to the former League of Nations complex in Geneva, Switzerland. A wide variety of suggestions were made, including such fanciful suggestions as a ship on the high seas to housing the entire complex in a single tall building. Amateur architects submitted designs, and local governments offered park areas, but the determined group of New York City boosters that included Grover Whalen, Thomas J. Watson, and Nelson Rockefeller, coordinated efforts with the Coordinator of Construction, Robert Moses, and Mayor William O'Dwyer, to assemble acceptable interim facilities. Sites in San Francisco (including the Presidio) and Marin County in California; St. Louis, Missouri; Boston, Massachusetts; Chicago, Illinois; Fairfield County, Connecticut; Westchester County and Flushing Meadows–Corona Park in New York; Tuskahoma, Oklahoma; the Black Hills of South Dakota; Belle Isle in Detroit, Michigan; and a site on Navy Island straddling the US–Canada border were considered as potential sites for the UN Headquarters. San Francisco, where the UN was founded in 1945, was favored by Australia, New Zealand, China, and the Philippines due to the city's proximity to their countries. On December 23, 1945, the Preparatory Commission of the United Nations recommended that the UN headquarters be located in the Eastern United States, with support from many Latin American and European members. The UN and many of its delegates seriously considered Philadelphia for the headquarters; the government of Philadelphia offered to donate land in several areas, including Fairmount Park, Andorra, and a Center City location which would have placed the headquarters along a mall extending from Independence Hall to Penn's Landing. The Manhattan site was ultimately chosen over Philadelphia after John D. Rockefeller Jr., offered to donate $8.5 million to purchase the land along the East River. Robert Moses and Rockefeller Sr. convinced Nelson Rockefeller to buy the land after the Rockefellers' Kykuit estate in Mount Pleasant, New York, was deemed too isolated from Manhattan.

==== Previous temporary sites ====
In 1945–46, London hosted the first meeting of the General Assembly in Methodist Central Hall, and the Security Council in Church House. The third and sixth General Assembly sessions, in 1948 and 1951, met in the Palais de Chaillot in Paris. Prior to the completion of the current headquarters, the UN used part of a Sperry Gyroscope Company factory in Lake Success, New York, for most of its operations, including the Security Council, between 1946 and 1952. The Security Council also held sessions on what was then the Bronx campus of Hunter College (now the site of Lehman College) from March to August 1946. Between 1946 and 1950, the General Assembly met at the New York City Building in Flushing Meadows–Corona Park, which had been built for the 1939 New York World's Fair and is now the site of the Queens Museum. The Long Island Rail Road reopened the former World's Fair station as United Nations station.

=== Construction ===
Per an agreement with the city, the buildings met some but not all local fire safety and building codes. In April 1948, US President Harry S. Truman requested that Congress approve an interest-free loan of $65 million in order to fund construction. The US Congress authorized the loan on August 6, 1948, on the condition that the UN repay the loan in twelve monthly instalments between July 1951 and July 1952. Of the $65 million, $25 million was to be made available immediately from the Reconstruction Finance Corporation. However, the full loan was initially withheld due to a case regarding UN employee Valentin Gubitchev and KGB spy Judith Coplon, who had been charged with espionage and were set to go on trial in March 1949. The House was loath to distribute the full $65 million because the government was concerned that the UN's proposed headquarters would grant diplomatic immunity to the two individuals. The UN used the Reconstruction Finance Corp.'s $25 million as a stopgap measure. The resulting case circumscribed the immunity of UN employees. To save money, the UN considered retaining an existing building on the Manhattan site, which had been slated for demolition once the headquarters was completed. Until 1950, the UN refused to accept private donations for the headquarters' construction, citing a policy that prohibited them from accepting donations.

The groundbreaking ceremony for the initial buildings occurred on September 14, 1948. A bucket of earth was removed to mark the start of construction for the basement of the 39-story Secretariat Building. In October, Harrison requested that its 58 members and the 48 US states participate in designing the interiors of the building's conference rooms. It was believed that if enough countries designed their own rooms, the UN would be able to reduce its own expenditures. The headquarters were originally supposed to be completed in 1951, with the first occupants moving into the Secretariat Building in 1950. However, in November, New York City's construction coordinator Robert Moses reported that construction was two months behind schedule. By that time, 60% of the headquarters' site had been excavated. The same month, the United Nations General Assembly unanimously voted to formally thank the national, state, and city governments for their role in building the headquarters. A joint venture of the George A. Fuller Company, Turner Construction, the Walsh Construction Company, and the Slattery Contracting Company was selected in December 1948 to construct the Secretariat Building, as well as the foundations for the remaining buildings.

The formal $23.8 million contract for the Secretariat Building was awarded in January 1949. A prayer space for people of all religions was announced on April 18, 1949. Until then, the UN had avoided the subject of a prayer room, because it had been difficult, if not impossible, to create a prayer room that could accommodate the various religions. Two days after this announcement, workers erected the first steel beam for the Secretariat Building, to little official fanfare. The consortium working on the Secretariat Building announced that 13,000 tons of steel would eventually be used in the building and that the steelwork would consist of a strong wind bracing system because the 72-by-287-foot (22 by 87 m) structure was so narrow. The flag of the United Nations was raised above the first beam as a demonstration for the many spectators who witnessed the first beam's erection. The Secretariat Building was to be completed no later than January 1, 1951, and if the consortium of Fuller, Turner, Slattery, and Walsh exceeded that deadline, they had to pay a minimum penalty of $2,500 per day to the UN. To reduce construction costs, the complex's planners downsized the Secretariat Building from 42 stories to 39 stories.

The cornerstone of the headquarters was originally supposed to be laid on April 10, 1949. However, in March of that year, Secretary-General Trygve Lie delayed the ceremony after learning that Truman would not be present to officiate the cornerstone laying. Seven months later, on October 11, Truman accepted an invitation to attend a cornerstone-laying ceremony, which was planned to occur on October 24. At the ceremony, New York Governor Thomas E. Dewey laid the headquarters' cornerstone.

In June 1949, UN officials wrote a letter to the American Bridge Company in which they expressed intent to buy 10,000 to 11,000 tons of steel. This steel would be used to build the rest of the complex, as well as a deck over FDR Drive on the headquarters' eastern side. To fit in with the accelerated schedule of construction, the steel would have to be delivered by September. The project also included a four-lane, $2.28 million vehicular tunnel under First Avenue so that traffic could bypass the headquarters when the UN was in session. The tunnel started construction on August 1, 1949. The tunnel involved two years of planning due to its complexity. Property inside Tudor City, just west of the headquarters, was also acquired so that two streets near the UN headquarters could be widened. The expanded streets were expected to speed up construction. In October 1949, contracts were awarded for the construction of two vehicular ramps over the FDR Drive: one to the north of the UN headquarters, and one to the south. Another contract to redevelop 42nd Street, a major corridor leading to the UN headquarters, was awarded in December of that year.

The Secretariat Building was ceremonially topped out in October 1949 after its steel framework had been completed. The UN flag was hoisted atop the roof of the newly completed steel frame in celebration of this event. The installation of the Secretariat Building's interior furnishings proceeded quickly so that the building could be open in January 1951. In February 1950, the UN invited companies from 37 countries to bid on $2 million worth of furniture for the Secretariat Building. A month later, the UN announced that it would also be accepting all donations from private citizens, entities, or organizations. This marked a reversal from their previous policy of rejecting all donations. A $1.7 million steel contract on the United Nations General Assembly Building, the last structure to be built, was awarded in April 1950. At the time, the building was not expected to be complete until 1952 due to a steelworkers' strike, which had delayed the production of steel. The first pieces of the platform over the FDR Drive was lifted into place the same month. In June 1950, Norway proposed that it decorate and outfit the complex's Security Council chamber, and the UN unofficially accepted the Norwegian offer.

In December 1949, Robert Moses proposed placing a playground inside the UN headquarters, but this plan was initially rejected. The UN subsequently reversed its position in April 1951, and Lie agreed to build a 100-by-140-foot (30 by 43 m) playground at the northeast corner of the headquarters site. However, the UN did reject an unusual "model playground" proposal for that site, instead choosing to construct a play area similar to others found around New York City. The playground opened in April 1953.

=== Opening ===
The first 450 UN employees started working at the Secretariat Building on August 22, 1950. The United Nations officially moved into the Secretariat Building on January 8, 1951, by which time 3,300 employees occupied the building. At the time, much of the Secretariat Building was still unfinished, and the bulk of the UN's operations still remained at Lake Success. A centralized phone-communications system was built to facilitate communications within the complex. The UN had completely moved out of its Lake Success headquarters by May. The construction of the General Assembly Building was delayed due to a shortage of limestone for the building, which in turn resulted from a heavy snow at the British limestone quarries that were supplying the building's Portland limestone. The erection of the building's framework began in February 1952. The Manhattan headquarters was declared complete on October 10, 1952. The cost of construction was reported to be on budget at $65 million. In 1953, twenty-one nations donated furnishings or offered to decorate the UN headquarters.

A new library building for the UN headquarters was proposed in 1952. The existing UN library, a 6-story structure formerly owned by the New York City Housing Authority (NYCHA), was too small. The NYCHA building could only hold 170,000 books, whereas the UN wanted to host at least 350,000 to 400,000 books in its library. The new facility was slated to cost $3 million. By 1955, the collection was housed in the Secretariat Building and held 250,000 volumes in "every language of the world", according to The New York Times. The Dag Hammarskjöld Library Building, designed by Harrison and Abramovitz, was officially dedicated in November 1961.

=== Early years ===
The gardens at the United Nations headquarters were originally closed to the public, but were made publicly accessible in 1958. By 1962, the United Nations' operations had grown so much that the headquarters could not house all of the organization's operations. As a result, the UN announced its intention to rent office space nearby. The Children's Fund (UNICEF) and the United Nations Development Programme (UNDP) moved to leased office space three years later. The East River-Turtle Bay Fund, a civic group, proposed that the United Nations purchase a 3-acre (1.2 ha) tract located to the south of the headquarters, on the site of the Robert Moses Playground and the Queens–Midtown Tunnel ventilation building between 41st and 42nd Streets. The northern portion of the United Nations site remained largely undeveloped through the mid-1960s; a proposed skyscraper by Wallace K. Harrison was scrapped after the UN ran out of money and had to borrow $65 million from the United States government. In December 1964 members of the Cuban Nationalist Association, including the Novo brothers, fired a bazooka at the headquarters as Che Guevara was speaking, however they failed to hit their target.

A radical proposal for redeveloping the area around the UN headquarters was proposed in 1968. It entailed closing First Avenue between 43rd and 45th Streets; constructing a new visitor center with two 44-story towers between 43rd and 45th Streets; and connecting the new visitor center with the existing headquarters via a public park. This plan was presented to the New York City government in 1969, but was ultimately not acted upon. The main headquarters was expanded slightly from 1978 to 1981, including the construction of a new cafeteria and a slight expansion of the Conference Building.

The UN staff continued to grow, and by 1969, the organization had 3,500 staff working in the New York headquarters. The UN rented additional space at 485 Lexington Avenue and in the Chrysler East complex, located three blocks west of the headquarters. It also announced its intention to build a new storage building between 41st and 42nd Streets. None of these properties would receive the extraterritorial status conferred on the original headquarters. One United Nations Plaza, an office building on 44th Street just outside the UN complex, was completed in 1975 with the United Nations Plaza Hotel on its upper stories. Another office tower outside the headquarters proper, Two United Nations Plaza, was completed in 1983. The new buildings were barely sufficient to accommodate the UN's demand for office space; the organization itself had expanded to 140 members by the 1970s.

=== Refurbishment ===
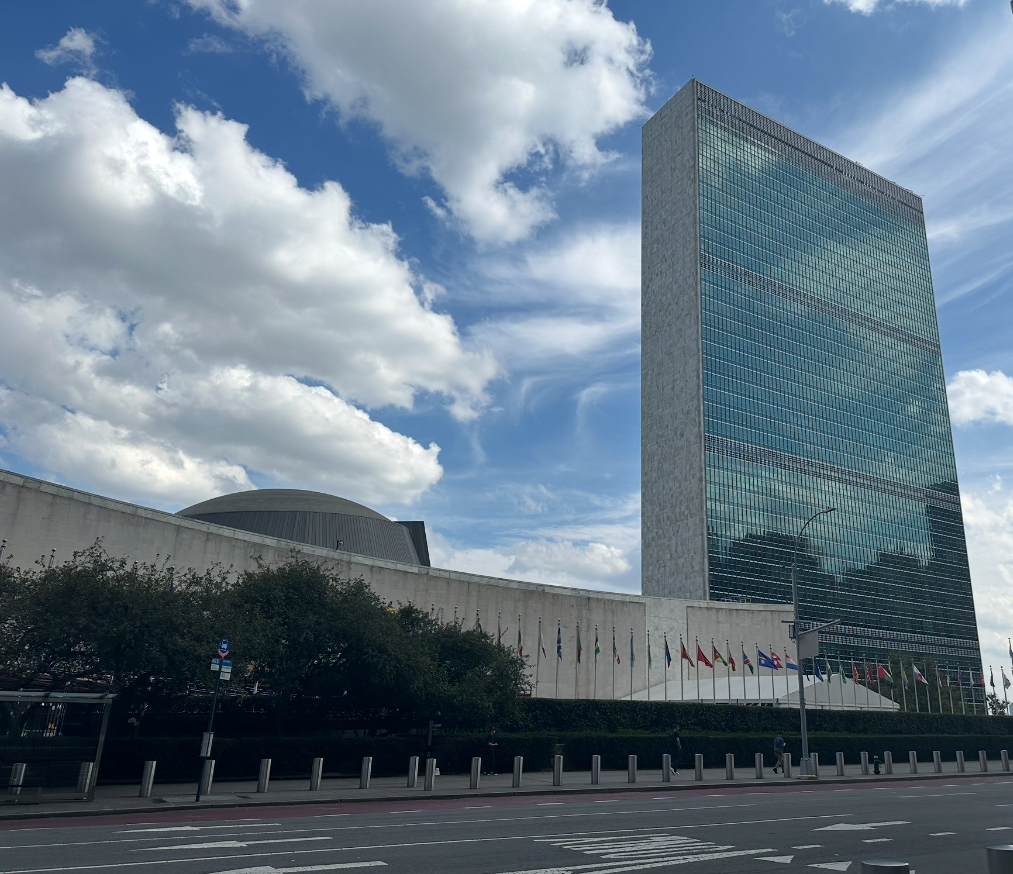
The UN headquarters in 2024

Due to funding shortfalls in the 1980s, the UN diverted funding from its headquarters' maintenance fund to peacekeeping missions and other activities. Because the headquarters was extraterritorial territory, they were exempt from various building regulations. By 1998, the buildings had become technologically dated, and UN officials considered renovating the headquarters. The mechanical systems were so outdated that the UN had to manufacture its own replacement parts. The New York Times wrote that "if the United Nations had to abide by city building regulations [...] it might well be shuttered". The UN commissioned a report from engineering firm Ove Arup & Partners, which published its findings in 2000. Ove Arup recommended renovating the UN headquarters over a six-year period, as well as expanding the Secretariat Building, but the UN could not secure funding for the project at the time.

In 2002, Secretary General Kofi Annan proposed replacing the nearby Robert Moses Playground with a new tower, relocating the Secretariat's offices there temporarily, and renovating the Secretariat Building itself. The UN selected Fumihiko Maki to design a building on the Moses site, but the New York State Legislature refused to pass legislation in 2005 that would have allowed these plans to proceed. Alternative sites were considered as temporary holding locations during renovations. In 2005, officials explored the possibility of establishing a new temporary site at the old Lake Success location. Brooklyn was also suggested as a temporary site. Another alternative for a temporary headquarters or a new permanent facility was the World Trade Center site. Once again, these plans met resistance both within the UN and from the United States and New York governments and were abandoned.

The UN then decided to renovate its existing structures over a seven-year period for US$1.6 billion. Louis Frederick Reuter IV originally designed the renovation, but he resigned in 2006 following various disputes between UN and US officials. Michael Adlerstein was hired as the new project architect. Engineering firm Skanska was hired to renovate the Secretariat, Conference, and General Assembly buildings in July 2007. The renovations, which were the first since the complex opened in 1950, were expected to take about 7 years to complete. When completed the complex is also expected to be more energy efficient and have improved security. A temporary $140 million "North Lawn Building" was built to house the United Nations' "critical operations" while renovations proceeded. Work began on May 5, 2008, but the project was delayed for a while. By 2009 the cost of the work had risen from $1.2 billion to $1.6 billion with some estimates saying it would take up to $3 billion.

Officials hoped the renovated buildings would achieve a LEED Silver rating. Despite some delays and rises in construction costs, renovation on the entire UN headquarters progressed rapidly. By 2012, the installation of the new glass facade of the Secretariat Building was completed, and the UN staff moved into the newly renovated building in July 2012. By September 2015, the renovations were nearly complete but the cost had risen to $2.15 billion. Demolition of the North Lawn Building began in January 2016. The building was replaced with an open plaza, and most of its materials were to be recycled.

In 2019, due to a budget shortfall, the UN cut back some services at its headquarters, such as heating and air-conditioning. On March 10, 2020, the UN closed to the general public due to the COVID-19 pandemic. During the pandemic, the UN furloughed some of its headquarters' staff.

=== Notable incidents ===
==== 2002 shooting ====
On October 3, 2002, a shooting occurred outside the headquarters when a lone gunman fired into the air. No one was injured or killed. The shooter was Steve Kim, who worked for the U.S. Postal Service in Des Plaines, Illinois; he aimed at drawing international attention to human rights abuses in North Korea under the regime of Kim Jong-il. In October 2003, a federal judge sentenced Kim to 27 months in prison.

== International character ==
The UN's six official languages are Arabic, Chinese, English, French, Russian and Spanish. Delegates speaking in any of these languages will have their words simultaneously interpreted into all of the others, and attendees are provided with headphones through which they can hear the interpretations. A delegate is allowed to make a statement in a non-official language, but must provide either an interpreter or a written copy of their remarks translated into an official language. Interpreters typically take turns, working for 30 minutes at a time.

=== Extraterritoriality and security ===
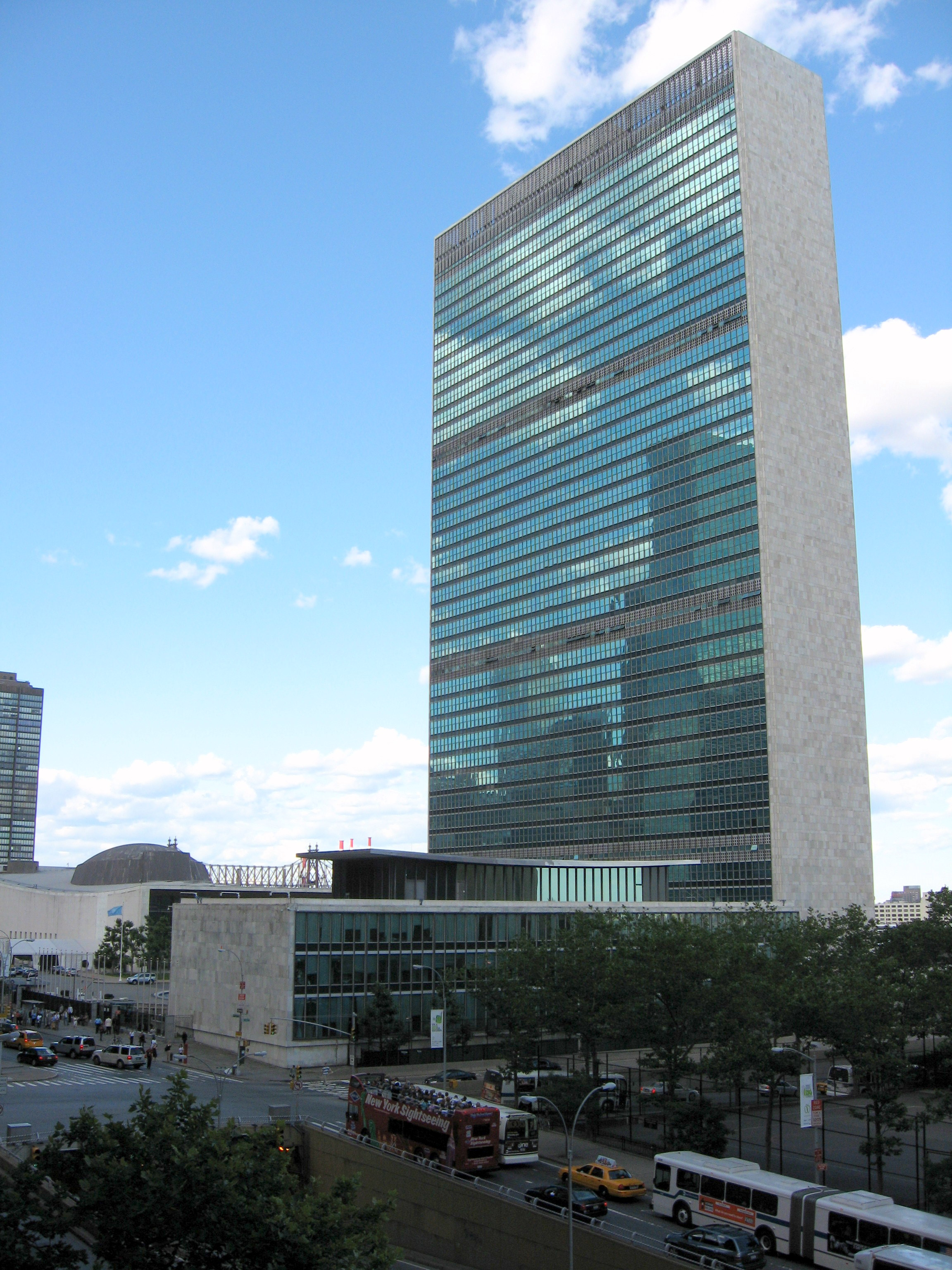
View from First Avenue towards the library, Secretariat and General Assembly buildings

The site of the UN headquarters has extraterritoriality status. This does not give immunity to those who commit crimes there, but there are cases where UN rules override the laws of New York City. For example, the headquarters uses water from the East River to cool one or more of the buildings, which is illegal in the city. The United Nations headquarters remains under the jurisdiction and laws of the United States, although a few members of the UN staff have diplomatic immunity and so cannot be prosecuted by local courts unless the immunity is waived by the Secretary-General. In 2005, Secretary-General Kofi Annan waived the immunity of Benon Sevan, Aleksandr Yakovlev, and Vladimir Kuznetsov in relation to the Oil-for-Food Programme, and all were charged in the United States District Court for the Southern District of New York. Benon Sevan later fled the United States to Cyprus, while Aleksandr Yakovlev and Vladimir Kuznetsov decided to stand trial.

United Nations security officers are generally responsible for security within the UN Headquarters. The New York City Police Department's 17th Precinct patrols the area around and near the complex, but may only formally enter the actual UN headquarters at the request of the Secretary-General.

=== Visa access ===
The 1947 Headquarters Agreement between the United States and the United Nations requires that American authorities allow the passage of UN state representatives, their families, experts on missions for the UN or its specialized agencies, UN-accredited journalists and non-governmental organizations, and guests invited on official UN business.

The C-2 visa is issued by the United States to allow foreigners who would otherwise not be allowed to stay in the country to be within a 25 mi (40 km) radius of Columbus Circle in New York City, an area known as the United Nations Headquarters District.

Some diplomats have been denied access in violation of the agreement. Examples include:

- Yasser Arafat, Chairman of the Palestine Liberation Organization, in 1988 under US President Ronald Reagan. The General Assembly voted to relocate to the Palace of Nations, in Geneva, Switzerland to hear Arafat speak.
- Hamid Aboutalebi in 2014 under US President Barack Obama, an Iranian diplomat the US accused of involvement in the 1979 Iran hostage crisis
- Various Russian officials in 2022 under US President Joe Biden, after the full-scale Russian invasion of Ukraine
- Palestinian Authority delegation in 2025 under US President Donald Trump, for an event where their country was to be recognized as a sovereign state by some UN member countries. The General Assembly continued in New York without representation from Palestine, which is an official observer member. It was widely incorrectly reported on social media that the General Assembly had again moved to Geneva.
- Alexander Alimov, Deputy Foreign Minister of Russia, and Abbas Araghchi, an Iranian diplomat, seeking to attend a 2026 UN Security Council meeting

The authority for these denials was explicitly granted by statutes passed by Congress in 1990 and 2014, authorizing the President to deny admission for people who have engaged in espionage or terrorism against the United States or its allies, or who pose a threat to national security interests. These denials have led to complaints from the affected countries and New York City Bar Association that the United States is not living up to its treaty obligations.

=== Currency and postage ===
The currency in use at the United Nations headquarters' businesses is the US dollar. The UN's stamps are issued in denominations of the US dollar.

The complex has a street address of United Nations headquarters, New York, NY, 10017, United States. For security reasons, all mail sent to this address is sterilized, so items that may be degraded can be sent by courier. The United Nations Postal Administration issues stamps, which must be used on stamped mail sent from the building.

=== Radio ===
For award purposes, amateur radio operators consider the UN headquarters a separate "entity" under some award programs such as DXCC. For communications, UN organizations have their own internationally recognized ITU prefix, 4U. However, only contacts made with the UN Headquarters in New York, and the ITU count as separate entities. Other UN organizations such as the World Bank count for the state or country they are located in. The UN Staff Recreation Council operates amateur radio station 4U1UN.

== Structures ==
The complex includes a number of major buildings. While the Secretariat Building is most predominantly featured in depictions of the headquarters, it also includes the domed General Assembly Building, the Dag Hammarskjöld Library, as well as the Conference and Visitors Center, which is situated between the General Assembly and Secretariat buildings, and can be seen only from the FDR Drive or the East River. Just inside the perimeter fence of the complex stands a line of flagpoles where the flags of all 193 UN member states, 2 observer states, plus the UN flag, are flown in English alphabetical order.

=== General Assembly Building ===
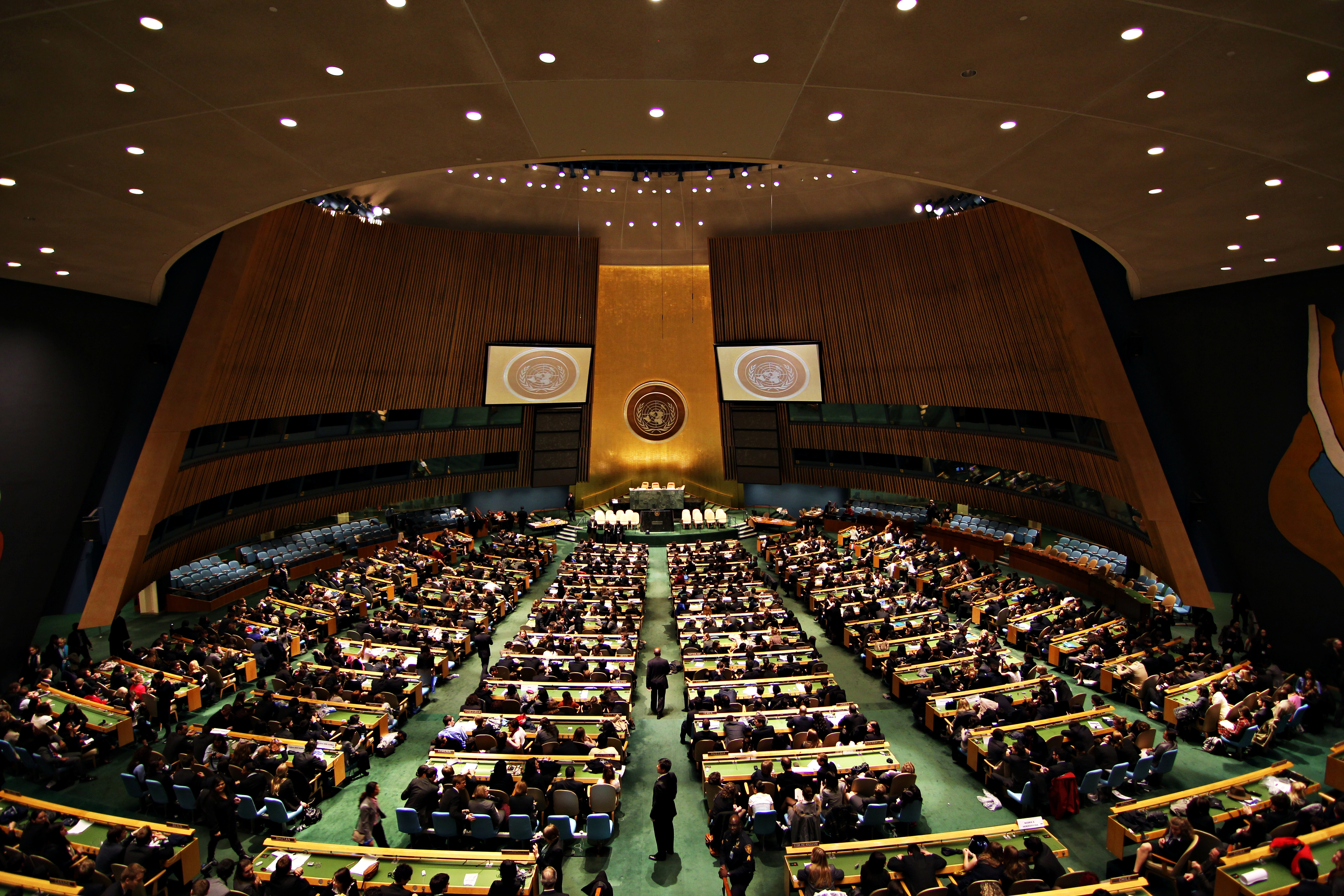
United Nations General Assembly Hall

The General Assembly Building, housing the United Nations General Assembly, holds the General Assembly Hall, which has a seating capacity of 1,800. At 165 ft (50 m) long by 115 ft (35 m) wide, it is the largest room in the complex. The Hall has two murals by the French artist Fernand Léger. At the front of the chamber is the rostrum containing the green marble desk for the President of the General Assembly, Secretary-General and Under-Secretary-General for General Assembly Affairs and Conference Services, as well as a matching lectern for speakers. Behind the rostrum is the UN emblem on a gold background. The rostrum is flanked by a paneled semi-circular wall, which contains seating booths for guests. The ceiling of the hall is 75 ft (23 m) high and surmounted by a shallow dome ringed by recessed light fixtures. Each of the 192 delegations has six seats in the hall with three at a desk and three alternate seats behind them.

The building contains two lobbies: a delegates' lobby to the south and a public lobby to the north. On the second floor, directly behind the General Assembly Hall, is the GA 200 room, which contains offices for the Secretary-General of the United Nations and the President of the United Nations General Assembly. There is a delegates' lounge on the south side of the second floor, which also connects with the Conference Building along the East River. There is also a meditation room next to the north lobby, as well as a large conference room and several smaller conference rooms in the basement beneath the General Assembly Hall. The basement also has television and radio studios, a sound-recording studio, and a master control room for the United Nations headquarters' communication system.

=== Conference Building ===
The Conference Building faces the East River between the General Assembly Building and the Secretariat, being directly east of both structures. It is five stories high and measures 400 feet (120 m) long. The exteriors were designed by the United Nations Board of Design, while the interiors were designed by Abel Sorenson. The second and third stories contain the chambers of the Economic and Social (ECOSOC), Trusteeship, and Security councils, all of which were designed by Scandinavian architects. All three chambers have technical equipment on the north and south walls, public seating to the west, delegates' seats in the center, and glass walls to the east. They each measure 72 feet (22 m) deep, 135 feet (41 m) wide, and 24 feet (7.3 m) long. Below are three large and six small conference rooms. Above the three conference chambers, near the rooftop of the building, were dining areas. There was also a lounge for delegates near the building's north end.

Swedish architect Sven Markelius designed the Economic and Social Council chamber, which contained wooden screens on the curved north and south walls, as well as an exposed ceiling. Markelius painted the ceiling in various hues of black, gray, and off-white. The space was redesigned in 1974 when ECOSOC was expanded from 27 to 54 members. The space could seat 336 members of the public and 40 journalists. The ECOSOC chamber was renovated again in 1995 and 2013, and a set of curtains named "Dialogos" by Ann Edholm was installed during the 2013 renovation.

Danish architect Finn Juhl designed the Trusteeship Council chamber, which includes wood screens spanning the north and south walls, as well as baffles and rods on the ceiling. A model of a white plane was originally suspended from the ceiling above the deliberation table. The space could seat 198 members of the public and 66 journalists. Danish artist Henrik Starcke designed a 9-foot-tall (2.7 m) teak sculpture of a woman on one wall. The chamber contains two paintings: Codice del Fuego (Fire Codex) on the left wall, a gift from Ecuador, and Gandzelo (Sacred Tree) on the right wall, a gift from Mozambique.

Norwegian architect Arnstein Arneberg was responsible for the Security Council chamber. The lowest parts of the walls contained dadoes in three shades of gray marble. The walls were upholstered in royal blue, with golden tapestries; these tapestries represent hope, faith, and charity. The space could seat 232 members of the public and 100 journalists, and there are also seats for delegates whose countries are not yet members of the Security Council. The artwork in the Security Council chamber includes a mural by Norwegian artist Per Krohg on the east wall. The oil canvas mural depicts a phoenix rising from its ashes. On one wall is a door leading to the office of the president of the Security Council. The Security Council chamber also leads to the Consultation Room, a private conference room for members of the council, and the Caucus Room, where members could host small meetings. A quiet room for delegates, designed by Günter Fruhtrunk and Paolo Nestler and donated by the Federal Republic of Germany, contains diagonal paneling.

=== Secretariat Building ===
The 39-story Secretariat Building was completed in 1950. It houses offices for the Secretary-General, the Under-Secretary-General for Legal Affairs and United Nations Legal Counsel, the Under-Secretary-General for Political Affairs and Office of Disarmament Affairs, and the Department for General Assembly and Conference Management (DGACM).

The wider western and eastern elevations of the facade consist of glass curtain walls set within a metal grid. The narrower northern and southern elevations are made of masonry clad with Vermont marble. The Secretariat Building was constructed with 889,000 square feet (82,600 m^{2}) of space and, at the time of its completion, could accommodate 4,000 workers. Floors 6, 16, and 28 are used as mechanical floors, and floor 39 serves as a mechanical penthouse, accessible only by stairs. Under the building is a three-story garage for UN employees, with 1,500 parking spaces. When the building was constructed, the lowest stories were to contain broadcasting studios, press offices, staff rooms, and other functions. The offices were placed on the upper floors.

=== Dag Hammarskjöld Library ===
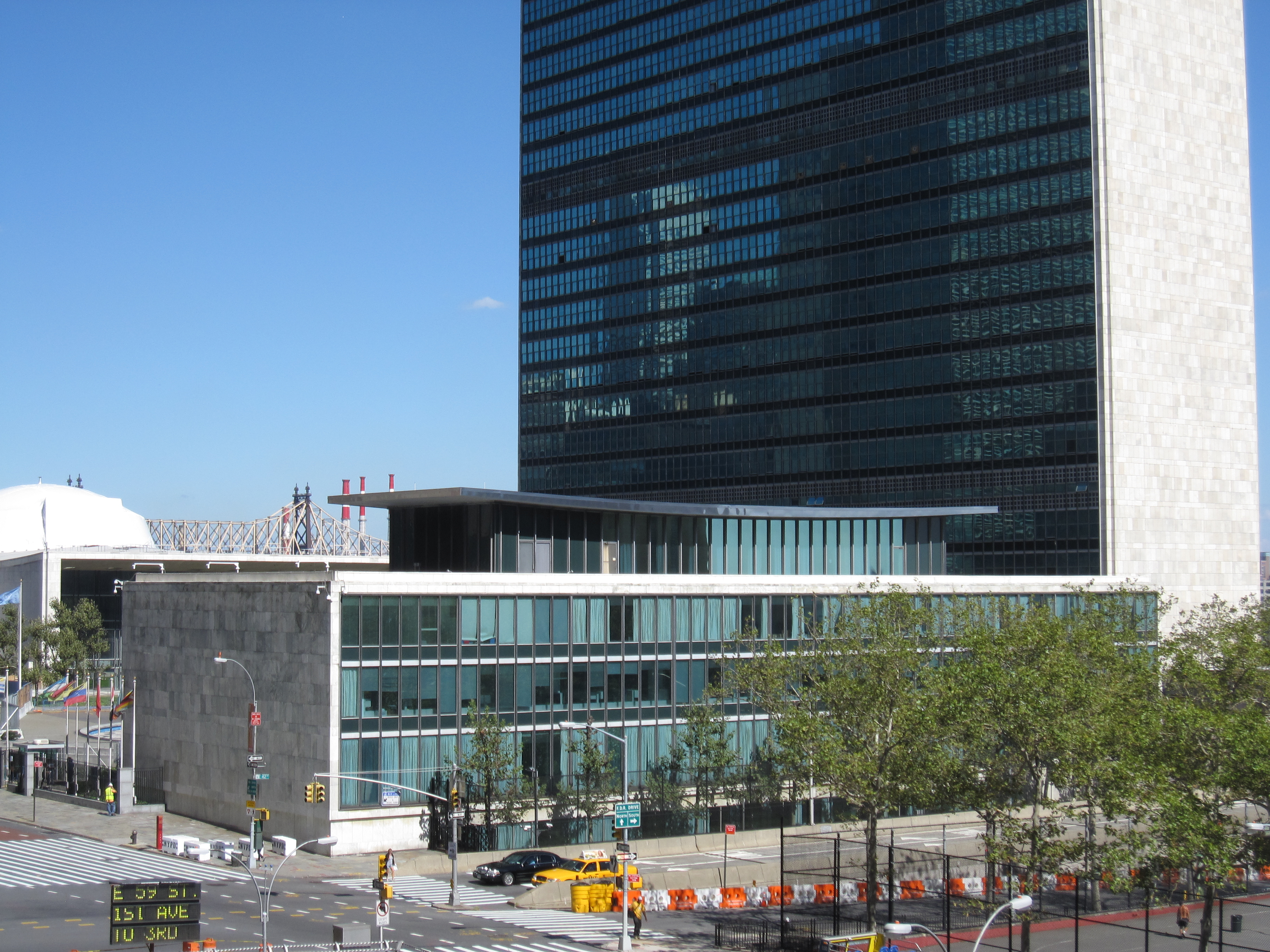
Dag Hammarskjöld Library

The library was founded with the United Nations in 1946. It was originally called the United Nations Library, later the United Nations International Library. In the late 1950s the Ford Foundation gave a grant to the United Nations for the construction of a new library building; Dag Hammarskjöld was also instrumental in securing the funding for the new building. The Dag Hammarskjöld Library was dedicated and renamed on November 16, 1961. The building was a gift from the Ford Foundation and is located next to the Secretariat at the southwest corner of the headquarters campus. The library holds 400,000 books, 9,800 newspapers and periodical titles, 80,000 maps, and the Woodrow Wilson Collection containing 8,600 volumes of League of Nations documents and 6,500 related books and pamphlets. The library's Economic and Social Affairs Collection is housed in the DC-2 building.

=== Other buildings ===
While outside of the complex, the headquarters also includes two large office buildings that serve as offices for the agencies and programmes of the organization. These buildings, known as DC-1 and DC-2, are located at One and Two United Nations Plaza respectively. DC1 was built in 1976. There is also an identification office at the corner of 46th Street, inside a former bank branch, where pre-accredited diplomats, reporters, and others receive their grounds passes. UNICEF House (3 UN Plaza) and the UNITAR Building (807 UN Plaza) are also part of headquarters. In addition, the Church Center for the United Nations (777 UN Plaza) is a private building owned by the United Methodist Church as an interfaith space housing the offices of several non-governmental organizations. The Office of Internal Oversight Services (OIOS) is located at 380 Madison Avenue.

=== Proposed tower ===
In October 2011, city and state officials announced an agreement in which the UN would be allowed to build a long-sought new office tower just south of the existing campus on the current Robert Moses Playground, which would be relocated. In exchange, the United Nations would allow the construction of an esplanade along the East River that would complete the East River Greenway, a waterfront pedestrian and bicycle pathway. While host nation authorities have agreed to the provisions of the plan, it needs the approval of the United Nations in order to be implemented. The plan is similar in concept to an earlier proposal that had been announced in 2000 but did not move forward.

== Art collection ==
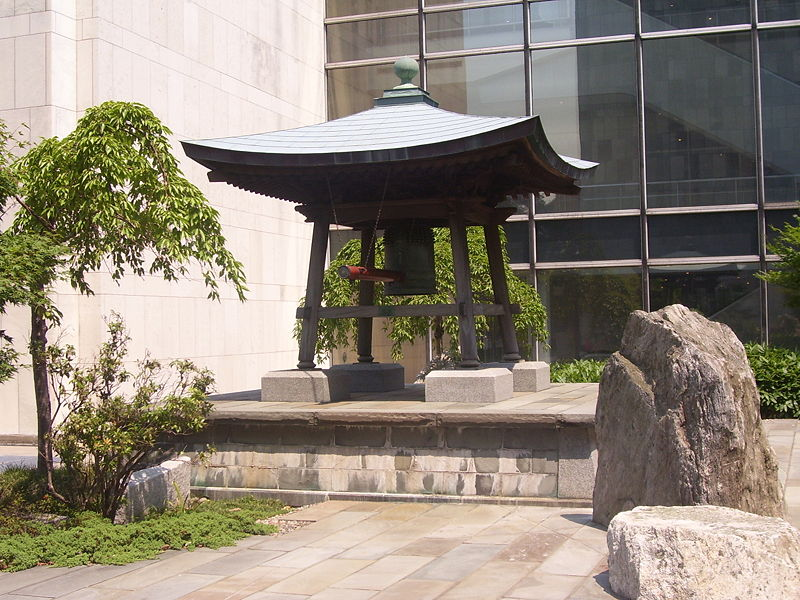
Japanese Peace Bell, made out of coins donated by children

The complex contains gardens, which were originally private gardens before being opened to the public in 1958. The complex is notable for its gardens and outdoor sculptures. Iconic sculptures include the "Knotted Gun", called Non-Violence, a statue of a Colt Python revolver with its barrel tied in a knot, which was a gift from the Luxembourg government and Let Us Beat Swords into Plowshares, a gift from the Soviet Union. The latter sculpture is the only appearance of the "swords into plowshares" quotation, from Isaiah 2:4, within the complex. Contrary to popular belief, the quotation is not carved on any UN building. Rather, it is carved on the "Isaiah Wall" of Ralph Bunche Park across First Avenue. A piece of the Berlin Wall also stands in the UN garden.

Other prominent artworks on the grounds include Peace, a Marc Chagall stained glass window memorializing the death of Dag Hammarskjöld; the Japanese Peace Bell which is rung on the vernal equinox and the opening of each General Assembly session; a Chinese ivory carving made in 1974, before the ivory trade was largely banned in 1989; and a Venetian mosaic depicting Norman Rockwell's painting The Golden Rule. A full-size tapestry copy of Pablo Picasso's Guernica, by Jacqueline de la Baume Dürrbach, is on the wall of the United Nations building at the entrance to the Security Council room. In 1952, two Fernand Léger murals were installed in the General Assembly Hall. One is said to resemble cartoon character Bugs Bunny, while US President Harry S. Truman dubbed the other work "Scrambled Eggs".

Two large murals by Brazilian artist Cândido Portinari, entitled Guerra e Paz (War and Peace) are located at the delegates hall. The works are a gift from the Brazilian government and Portinari intended to execute them in the United States. However, he was denied a visa due to his communist convictions and decided to paint them in Rio de Janeiro. They were later assembled in the headquarters. After their completion in 1957, Portinari, who was already ill when he started the masterpiece, succumbed to lead poisoning from the pigments his doctors advised him to abandon.

== Relocation proposals ==
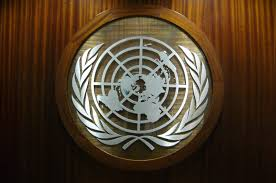
United Nations logo in headquarters

Due to the significance of the organization, proposals to relocate its headquarters have occasionally been made. Complainants about its current location include diplomats who find it difficult to obtain visas from the United States and local residents complaining of inconveniences whenever the surrounding roads are closed due to visiting dignitaries, as well as the high costs to the city. A US telephone survey in 2001 found that 67% of respondents favored moving the United Nations headquarters out of the country. Countries critical of the US, such as Iran and Russia, are especially vocal in questioning the current location of the United Nations, arguing that the United States government could manipulate the work of the General Assembly through selective access to politicians from other countries, with the aim of having an advantage over rival countries. In the wake of the Snowden global surveillance disclosures, alongside other claims concerning spying the subject of the relocation of the UN headquarters was again discussed, this time for security reasons. An Al Jazeera commentator from 2025 claimed that relocating the UN headquarters would reduce costs while allowing the Global South to participate in the UN more extensively. A Project Syndicate commentator wrote in support of relocation the same year, saying that the US's possession of a Security Council veto was being used to obstruct UN business.

Among the cities that have been proposed to house the headquarters of the United Nations are Saint Petersburg, Montreal, Dubai, Jerusalem, and Nairobi. A 2013 source had expressed that the proposals have never gone from being mere declarations.

Under terms of section 11 of the 1947 UN Headquarters Agreement U.S. federal, state or local authorities of the United States of America are not to impose impediments to transit to or from the headquarters for the U.N. This rule not only covers representatives of members, but also towards officials of the United Nations itself, or participating organisations.

== Public gatherings ==
Large scale protests, demonstrations, and other gatherings directly on First Avenue are rare. Some gatherings have taken place in Ralph Bunche Park, but it is too small to accommodate large demonstrations. The closest location where the New York City Police Department usually allows demonstrators is Dag Hammarskjöld Plaza at 47th Street and First Avenue.

Besides gatherings solely for diplomats and academics, there are a few organizations that regularly hold events at the UN. The United Nations Association of the United States of America (UNA-USA), a non-governmental organization, holds an annual "member's day" event in one of the conference rooms. Model United Nations conferences sponsored by UNA-USA, the National Collegiate Conference Association (NCCA/NMUN), and the International Model UN Association (IMUNA/NHSMUN) hold part of their sessions in the General Assembly chamber. Seton Hall University's Whitehead School of Diplomacy hosts its UN summer study program at the headquarters as well.

== In popular culture ==
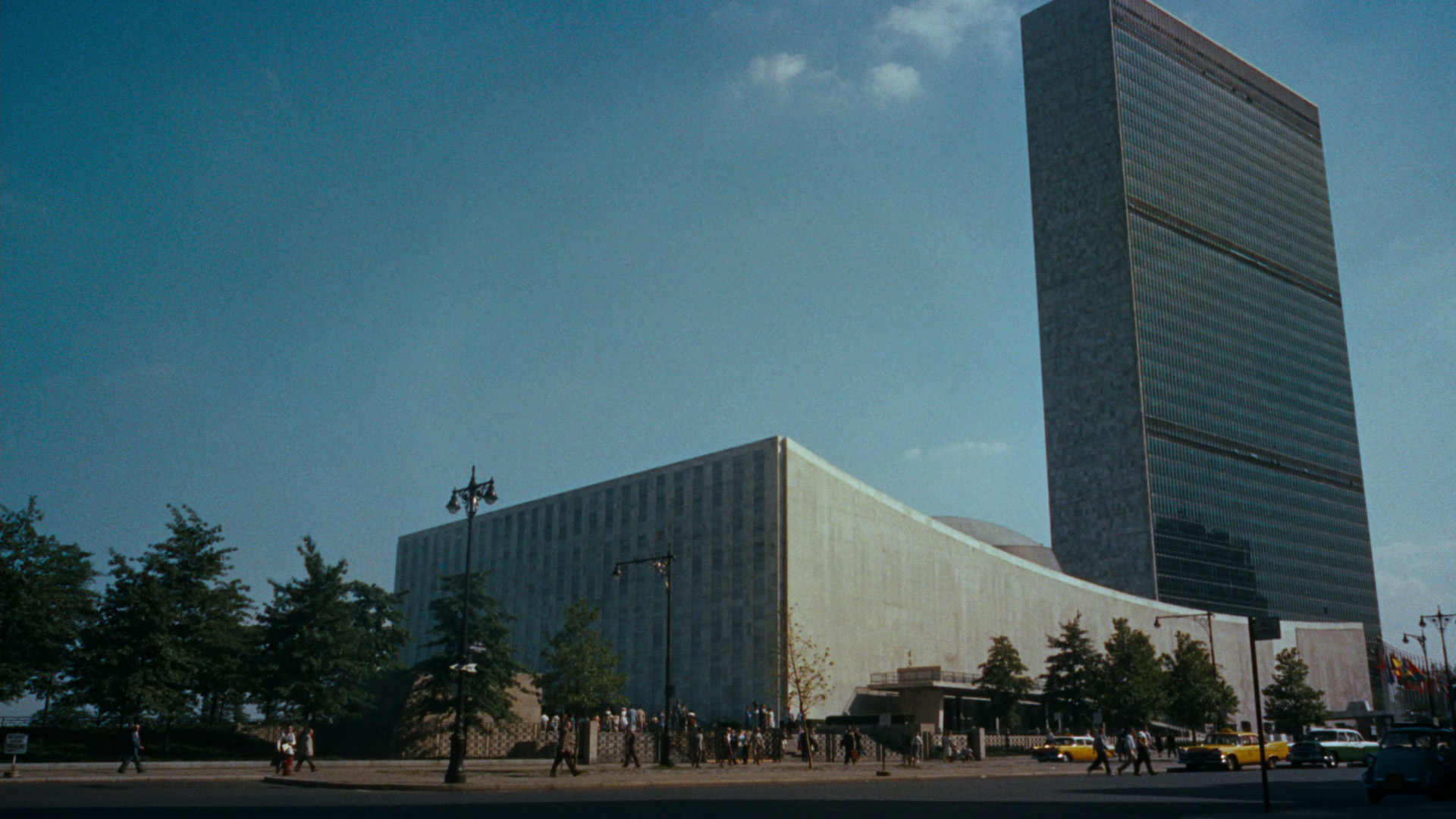
View of the headquarters in the 1959 MGM thriller North by Northwest by Alfred Hitchcock

The United Nations headquarters is often featured in movies and other pop culture. Several films have been set at the headquarters, including The Glass Wall (1953) and North by Northwest (1959). The UN did not give producers permission to film at its headquarters until 2005, when The Interpreter was filmed there. According to architect Aaron Betsky, the United Nations headquarters has often been used to stand for "freedom, justice, and solutions to specific local problems through a grid-like, mirror-like deliberative process". Due to the headquarters' symbolism, several works of fiction have depicted the building under threat, including the films The Pink Panther Strikes Again (1976), Superman IV: The Quest for Peace (1987), and The Peacemaker (1997).

== See also ==
- U Thant Island
- UN Campus, Bonn, Germany
- UN City, Copenhagen
- United Nations Office at Nairobi
