= The Corinthian (Manhattan) =

Residential skyscraper in Manhattan, New York

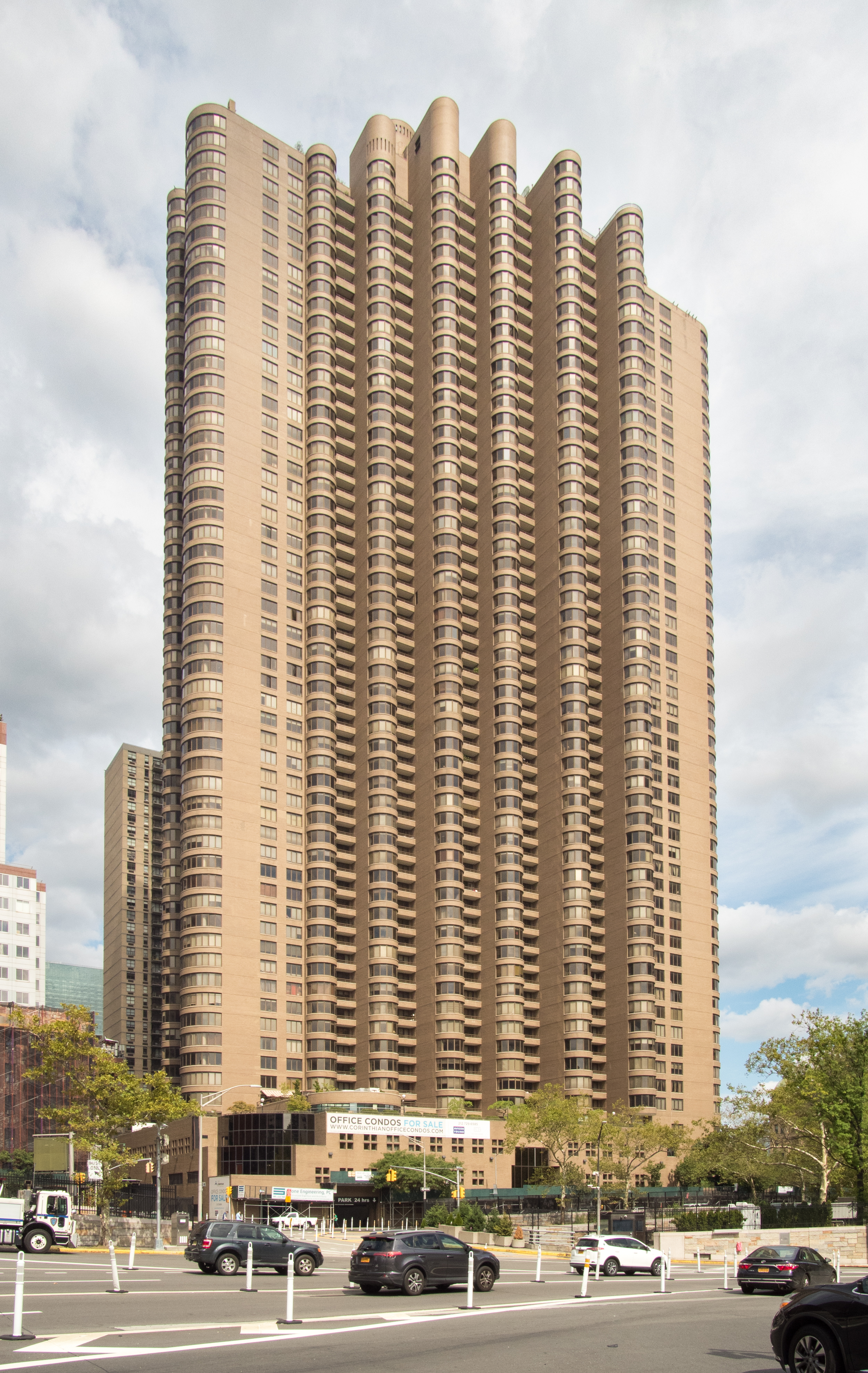
- The Corinthian in September 2019
- Interactive map of the The Corinthian area

General information
- Type: Mixed use, predominately apartment building
- Location: 330 East 38th Street, Manhattan, New York City (Note: The address of the office condominiums is 345 East 37th Street.)
- Coordinates: 40.74645°N 73.973°W
- Construction started: 1985
- Completed: 1988
- Operator: Douglas Elliman

Height
- Height: 546 ft (166.4 m)

Technical details
- Floor count: 57
- Floor area: 1,100,000 sq ft (100,000 m^{2})

Design and construction
- Architects: Der Scutt, Michael Schimenti
- Developer: Bernard Spitzer
- Structural engineer: Fischer & Redlien, P.C.
- Other designers: Thomas Balsley Associates (landscape architect)
- Main contractor: Kreisler Borg Florman

Other information
- Parking: 186 spaces

The Corinthian is a 57-story apartment building at 330 East 38th Street in the Murray Hill neighborhood of Manhattan in New York City. It contains 863 residential units and was the city's largest apartment building when it opened in 1988. Designed by architect Der Scutt, the residential tower contains groups of fluted towers with semicircular windows that provide a 180-degree view from every apartment. The base of the building incorporates much of the former structure of the East Side Airlines Terminal and is used as commercial space.

== Site ==
The north elevation

The building is located on a 81,173-square-foot (7,541 m^{2}) land lot that occupies a full city block between First Avenue and Tunnel Entrance Street from East 37th to 38th streets, adjacent to the Manhattan entrance to the Queens–Midtown Tunnel. The block was previously occupied by the East Side Airlines Terminal, a facility used for passenger ticketing, baggage handling and bus service to LaGuardia and JFK airports via the adjacent tunnel. The terminal stopped providing bus service to the airports in 1984 and was auctioned off by the Metropolitan Transportation Authority (MTA) the following year. Among the three properties that the MTA planned to sell—which also included the New York Coliseum and the West Side Yard—the agency decided to sell the East Side Airlines Terminal first because it was the simplest transaction.

An opening bid of $55 million was set by the MTA for the East Side Airlines Terminal. According to Constantine Sidamon-Eristoff, the chairman of the MTA's real estate committee, the agency expected to receive no more than a bid approaching $80 million at the auction, which was held on the main floor of the terminal. However, a bidding war among eight prospective buyers that went for 21 rounds and lasted for three and a half hours drove up the price of the real estate to $90.6 million. The site was attractive to developers as it was already zoned to permit high-density use and there would be no occupants to relocate after the terminal's remaining leases expired in 1986. The winning bidder was a joint venture consisting of Bernard Spitzer, Peter L. Malkin, and two privately held corporations—International Energy Corporation and Kriti Exploration Inc. (Note: Other bidders at the auction included the Glick Organization (the developer of Manhattan Place, located diagonally across First Avenue from the East Side Airlines Terminal), Larry Silverstein, and Edward Milstein (the son of Paul Milstein).) The acquisition was believed to be the largest ever purchase price of Manhattan real estate at an auction. (Note: As a comparison, the $90.6 million purchase of the 1.9-acre East Side Airlines Terminal site in February 1985 was nearly the same as the $95 million purchase of the 76-acre Lincoln West site by Donald Trump in December 1984 (which was subsequently redeveloped as part of Riverside South), but the Lincoln West site entailed more complications related to zoning issues.)

In September 1986, the blocks from East 37th to 40th Streets between First and Second avenues—including the site of the East Side Airlines Terminal—were rezoned from C6-4 to C1-9. This change did not increase the maximum allowable floor area that could be built, but instead allowed for commercial uses on the lower floors and residential uses on the upper floors.

== Architecture ==
The development team had originally planned to tear down the entire East Side Airlines Terminal, but after discovering that it was very well constructed they decided to save a significant portion of the terminal and incorporate it as offices in the base of the structure, adding columns to support the new residential tower above. The remaining 35 percent of the terminal along First Avenue was demolished to create a landscaped plaza, fountain, and porte-cochère. The residential tower was constructed on solid earth, avoiding a tube from the Queens–Midtown Tunnel that runs underneath the eastern portion of the site.

=== Exterior ===
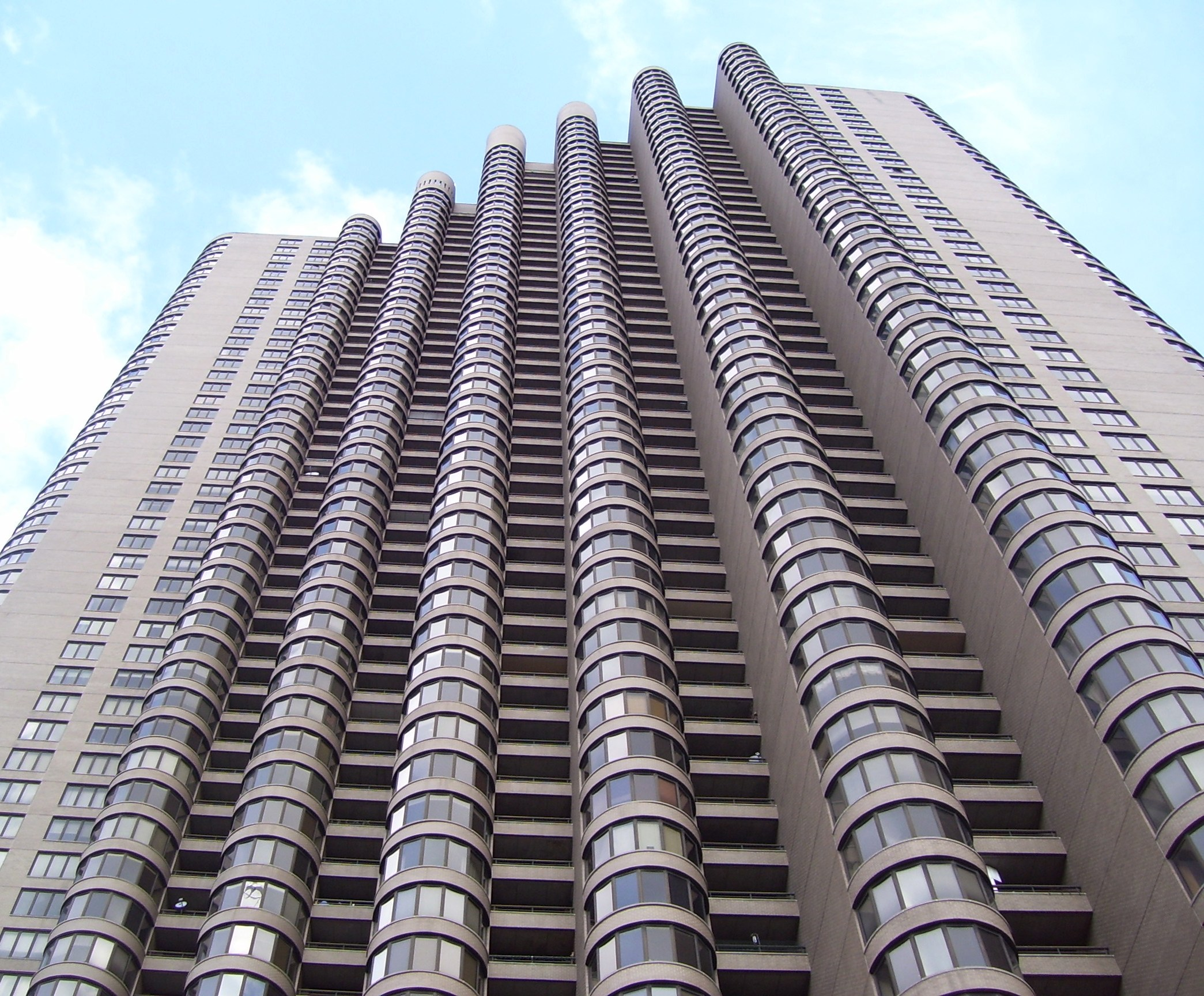
The Corinthian features fluted towers with bay windows.

The Corinthian was designed by Der Scutt, design architect, and Michael Schimenti. Spitzer noted "the building could have been overpowering and perhaps monstrous esthetically". The Corinthian has a curved massing to maximize views from its apartments and also to position them away from other tall buildings. Its fluted towers with bay windows are unusual compared to the traditional boxy shape of buildings in the city, and it bears a resemblance to Marina City and Lake Point Tower in Chicago. (Note: Robert A. M. Stern and the co-authors of his 2006 book New York 2000 noted that building's design of fluted columns may have been influenced by Der Scutt's experience working with Paul Rudolph and by Harrison and Fouilhoux's Rockefeller Apartments.) Spitzer explained that the building's name was selected from the resulting design because "we think we have the contemporary version of the Corinthian column, the most lavish of the Greek columns." The semicircular windows provide a 180-degree view from every apartment. Many of the apartments include private balconies, which are located between the fluted towers.

A 26,920-square-foot (2,501 m^{2}) privately owned public space with trees and benches is located on east side of the site adjacent to First Avenue, which was the largest residential plaza in New York City. The landscaped plaza was designed by Thomas Balsley Associates, the same firm that designed other nearby public spaces including the plaza for Manhattan Place, the East River Esplanade Park from East 36th to 38th streets, and renovations to St. Vartan Park. Facing the residential entrance to the building in the plaza is a cascading, semicircular waterfall fountain and a 10-foot (3.0 m) high Aristides Demetrios bronze sculpture, "Peirene" named after the Fountain of Peirene in Corinth.

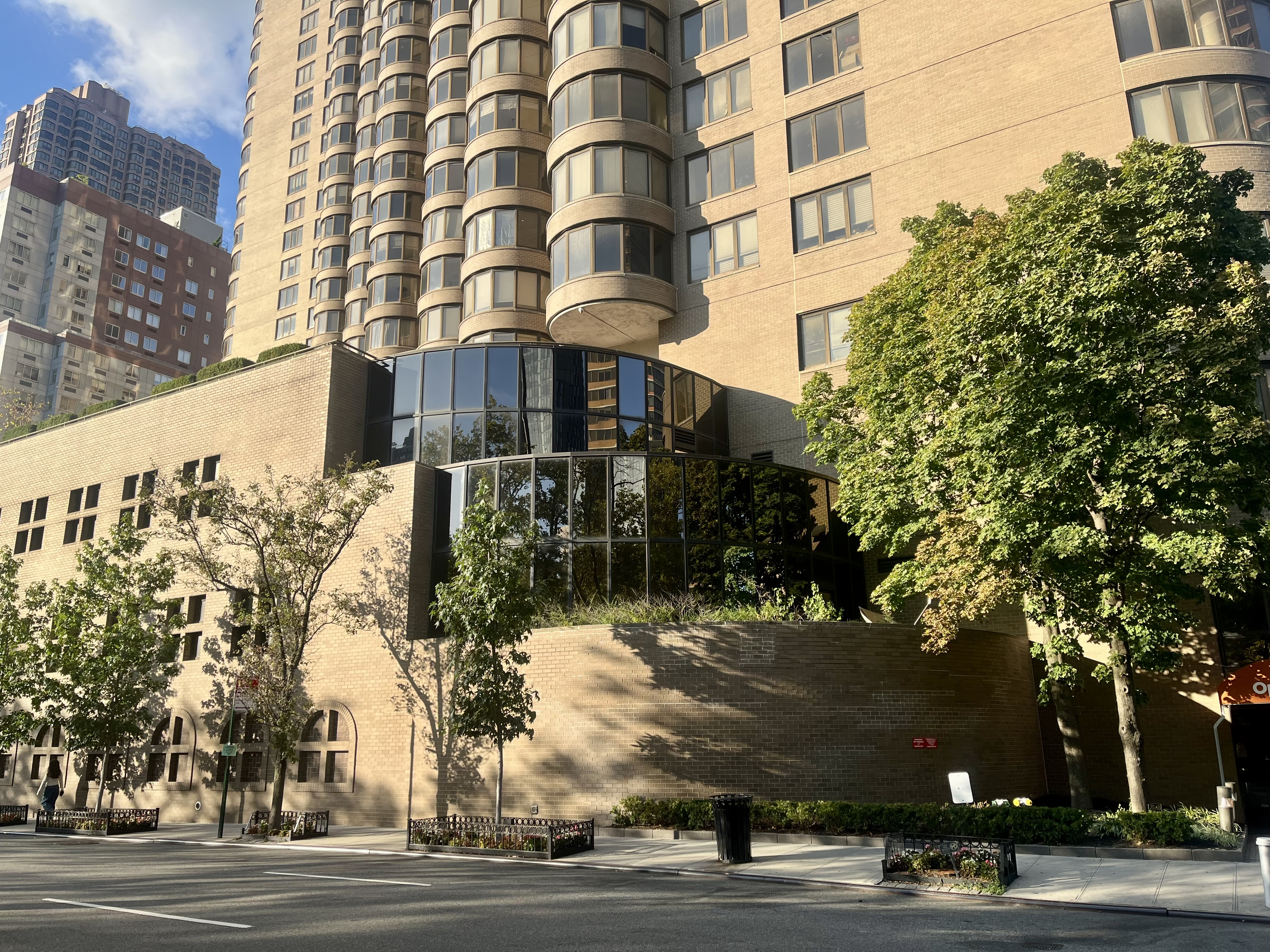
Corners of the commercial base include curved floor-to-ceiling windows and terraces.

The corners of the former East Side Airlines Terminal were rounded off to create curved edges on both floors of the commercial space in the base of the Corinthian; corner offices include floor-to-ceiling windows and private terraces.

=== Interior ===
At 1,100,000 square feet (100,000 m^{2}) it is the largest project of Bernard Spitzer. It has 863 apartments, 125,000 square feet (11,600 m^{2}) of commercial space on the first through third floors and a 48,000-square-foot (4,500 m^{2}) garage. The fourth floor of The Corinthian—the former roof of the East Side Airlines Terminal—serves as the building's amenity level and includes a health club and a setback roof terrace with a 50-foot-long (15 m) indoor swimming pool, sun deck, and one-quarter mile (0.40 km) outdoor jogging track. Residential units are located on the fifth floor and above, which are served by six passenger elevators (three serve the lower floors and three serve the upper floors). The Corinthian has 17 apartments per floor, which are arranged along a long, curving interior hallway.

The residential lobby facing First Avenue is 90 feet (27 m) long and 28 feet (8.5 m) high and includes a 7-foot (2.1 m) high bronze sculpture by Bill Barrett, "Step for Two" and a 15-foot (4.6 m) high wood relief by John A. Kapel called "Totem." The commercial space has a separate entrance on East 37th Street and includes a lobby on the ground floor with a two-story high glass wall and two passenger elevators serving the commercial tenants on the second and third floors.

== History ==
Construction of the building commenced in October 1985. Sales of apartments at the Corinthian began in October 1986 and were marketed by M. J. Raynes. A total of 160 residential units were purchased within the first five weeks of sales and the firm was still screening 1,200 prospective buyers that had signed up for the waiting list to see plans for apartments. At that time, the building was still under construction and wasn't scheduled for occupancy until the fall of 1988. Nearly thirty percent of the first 150 apartments sold were purchased by residents of Queens and Long Island, which M. J. Raynes speculated might have been a result of the building's proximity to the Queens–Midtown Tunnel.

The new building was also situated near the headquarters of the United Nations and its marketing efforts targeted overseas buyers by issuing press releases in five foreign languages. An advertisement was also posted in Newsday, written by Spitzer as the managing partner of the Corinthian, as a letter to empty nest suburbanites that were considering moving back to the city with suggestions on the features they should consider in a new apartment used as a permanent residence or a pied-à-terre. The building was completed in March 1988 and the first tenants began moving in the following month. By then, about half of the building's units had been sold and about 60 to 70 new apartments were being purchased each month.

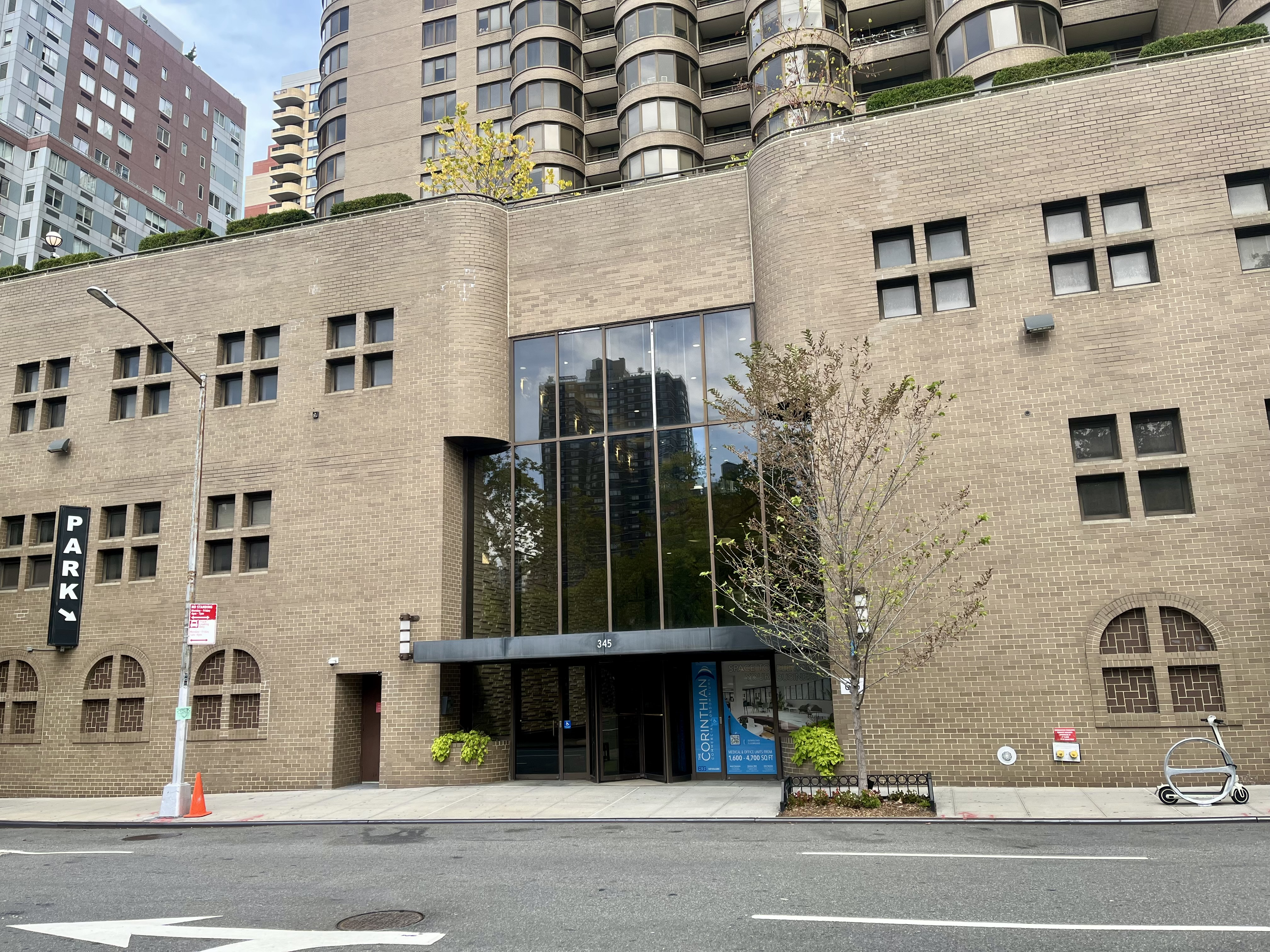
The office condominiums have a separate entrance on East 37th Street.

Spitzer had originally wanted to develop the Corinthian as a rental building, but opted to change the ownership structure to take advantage of a strong condominium market and facilitate financing of the building. By 1991, about 25 percent of the building's units were still owned by the developer's partnership and some of these were being rented out. (Note: At the time, Spitzer's son Eliot was living in an apartment on the 49th floor of the building; he resided in the Corinthian from 1989 to 1993.) The Spitzer family sold off the building's parking garage in 2009 for $10.3 million and the office condominiums in 2011 for $31 million. The office units were later renovated to attract more high-end medical practices given its proximity to NYU Langone Medical Center.

In 2013, Gaia Real Estate purchased the 50th floor of the building for $14.6 million from Pfizer, which had bought the floor before the building opened and used the 16,000-square-foot (1,500 m^{2}) layout consisting of 21 bedrooms and 25 bathrooms as a corporate executive suite for its nearby headquarters at the Pfizer Building. The 50th floor was subsequently renovated and divided into separate apartments. (Note: The Corinthian was selected for corporate housing by Pfizer CEO Edmund T. Pratt Jr., who noticed the building while it was under construction from the window in his office. Pfizer had purchased a total of 24 units in the building in 1986, which saved the expense of leasing blocks of rooms at the Helmsley Hotel and UN Plaza Hotel for employees making business trips to Manhattan and other corporate guests.) A year later, Gaia bought 144 more units in The Corinthian for $147 million, which were originally owned by the Spitzer family and had been rented out. These apartments were remarketed as The Corinthian Collection and sold in their original layout or as renovated units designed by Andres Escobar.

A $3 million renovation to the building's amenity level on the fourth floor was completed in August 2014, which included the addition of a golf simulator, a dance studio, and an expansion of the fitness center.

In 2018, Turtle Bay Music School moved into an office condominium with its own street-level entrance at the corner of East 38th Street and Tunnel Entrance Street; the school spent $15 million to purchase two office condominiums and renovate a former medical office into a school containing 5 classrooms, 13 practice rooms/studios and a 161-seat recital hall. The music school closed in 2020 due to financial difficulties and was later converted into a Pre-K center operated by the New York City Department of Education.

== Critical reception ==
The Corinthian has received mixed reviews from architecture critics. In its description of the newly completed apartment building, the 1988 AIA Guide to New York City noted, "Here Scutt has excelled—his best building by far." Architectural critic Carter Horsley wrote that the building "bursts with energy and has a palatial lobby." In the 1996 book Der Scutt Retrospective, author Robert Metzger wrote that the semi-circular bay windows create "an unusual sculptural mass which heightens the visual drama of the building" and "The Corinthian is an enormous structure, and this sculptural effect diminishes the bulk visually." While The Corinthian was still under construction in 1987, Robert Campbell of the Boston Globe described the building's architectural design as "OK if unremarkable." Architectural critic Philip Nobel said the building "looks like a bundle of sticks" and other writers have characterized The Corinthian as "a stick of brick-covered dimes."
