= Manhattan Place =

Residential skyscraper in Manhattan, New York

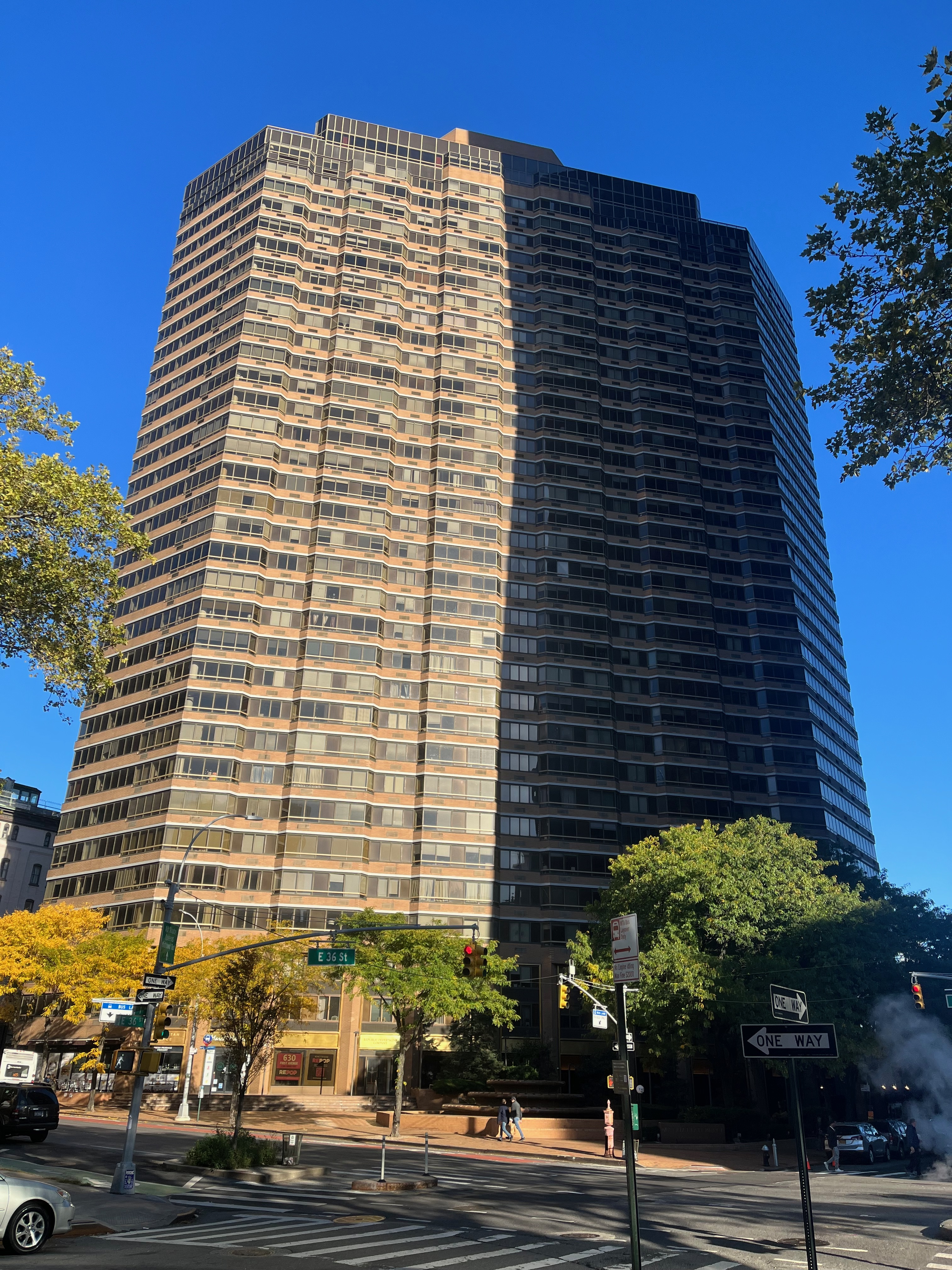
- Manhattan Place in October 2022
- Interactive map of the Manhattan Place area

General information
- Status: Completed
- Location: 630 First Avenue, New York City, United States
- Coordinates: 40°44′43″N 73°58′19″W
- Construction started: 1983
- Opened: 1984
- Management: R.E.M. Residential

Height
- Height: 111 m (364 ft)

Technical details
- Floor count: 35

Design and construction
- Architect: Costas Kondylis
- Architecture firm: Philip Birnbaum & Associates
- Developer: The Glick Organization
- Other designers: Thomas Balsley Associates (landscape architect)

Other information
- Number of units: 487
- Parking: 100 spaces

Manhattan Place is a 35-story apartment building at 630 First Avenue in the Murray Hill neighborhood of Manhattan in New York City. Opened in 1984, it was one of the city's first high-rise condominiums and the first project in the city for which Costas Kondylis received credit as the design architect.

== History ==
The building, developed by The Glick Organization, is located on the east side of First Avenue between 36th and 37th streets on a 40,000-square-foot (3,700 m^{2}) site. Previously occupied by a Texaco gas station and a warehouse, the site took three years to acquire and rezone and also included the purchase of air rights from the nearby Bide-A-Wee animal shelter. Negotiations with the New York City Planning Commission and Manhattan Community Board 6 during the planning process resulted in a shifting of the building's orientation so that its street level landscaped plaza would face St. Vartan Park. The developer also agreed to contribute $427,000 to subsidize rents for Bellevue Hospital workers that wish to live in the Kips Bay neighborhood and $900,000 to rehabilitate St. Vartan Park. Groundbreaking took place in 1983.

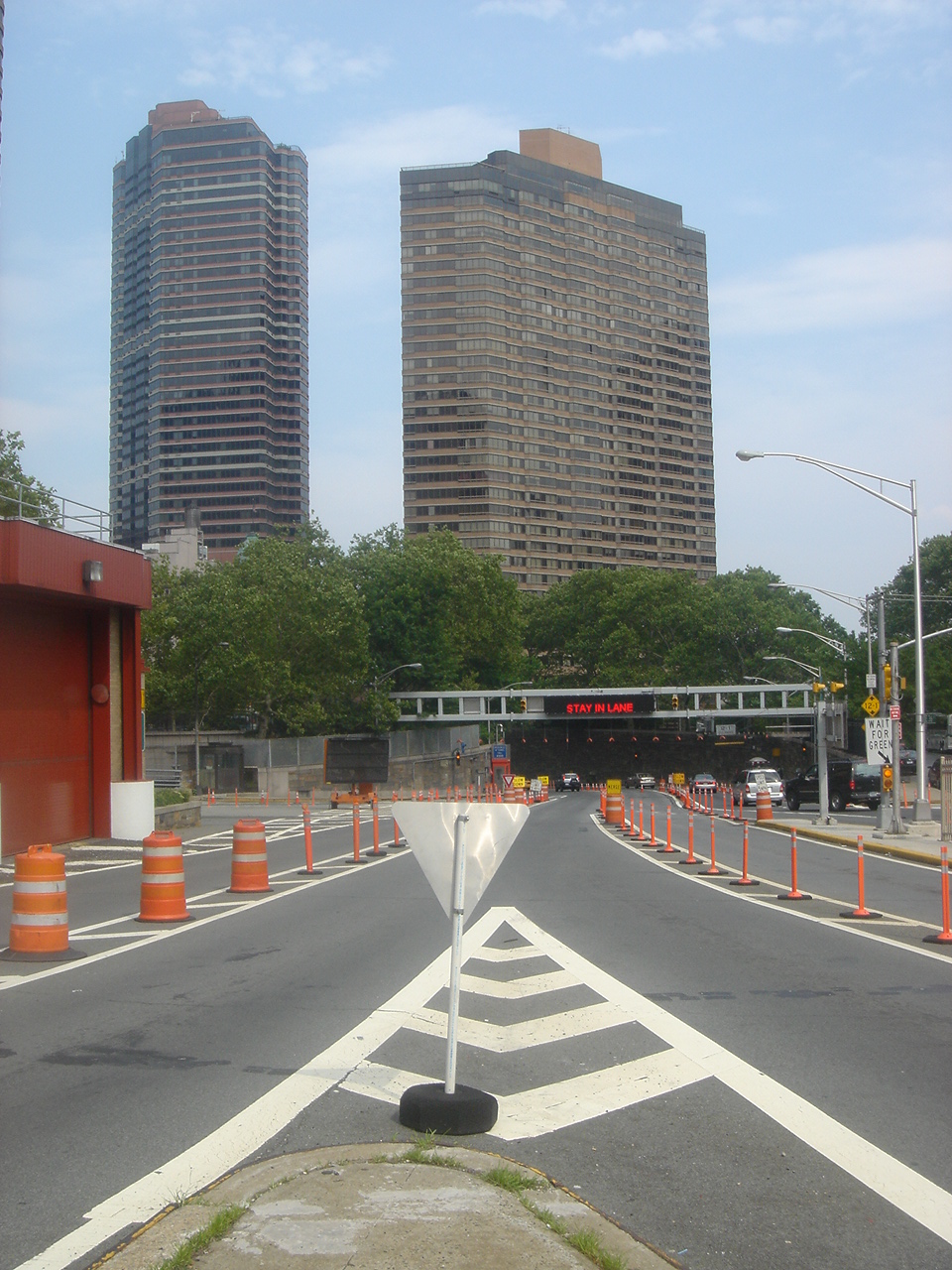
Manhattan Place viewed from the entrance plaza to the Queens–Midtown Tunnel

Designed by architect Costas Kondylis of Philip Birnbaum & Associates, Manhattan Place was one of New York City's first high-rise condominiums and also one of the first residential buildings in the city at that time to focus on luxury design. The 35-story structure contains 487 residential units with ground-level retail along the First Avenue frontage. Its residential tower is a triangular-ended rectangle oriented diagonally to face the northeast and southwest, maximizing the building's unobstructed views of the East River and the Manhattan skyline across St. Vartan Park and the entrance to the Queens–Midtown Tunnel. Several sets of bay windows run along the length of the building, which has a façade consisting of horizontal ribbons of glass and brick. Manhattan Place includes a 6,000-square-foot (560 m^{2}) rooftop health club with a pool, gym, indoor jogging track, and lounge. The building's lobby includes a waterfall and has tall windows overlooking the public plaza with views of the Empire State Building.

While Manhattan Place was being built, three full-size replicas of apartments were provided in a sales office set up at 664 First Avenue, one block north of the construction site in the former Kips Bay Brewing Company building. Sales of condominium units began in January 1984 and all of the apartments sold out before the end of the year. The Glick Organization's marketing program for Manhattan Place won five National Marketing Awards at the National Association of Home Builders convention in January 1985. When asked about the naming of the building as "Manhattan Place", Jeffrey Glick of The Glick Organization said "I wanted 'Manhattan' because Manhattan is the best place to live." He explained that he usually discusses the selection of a building's name with his media and advertising consultants; a building's name can be an important marketing tool.

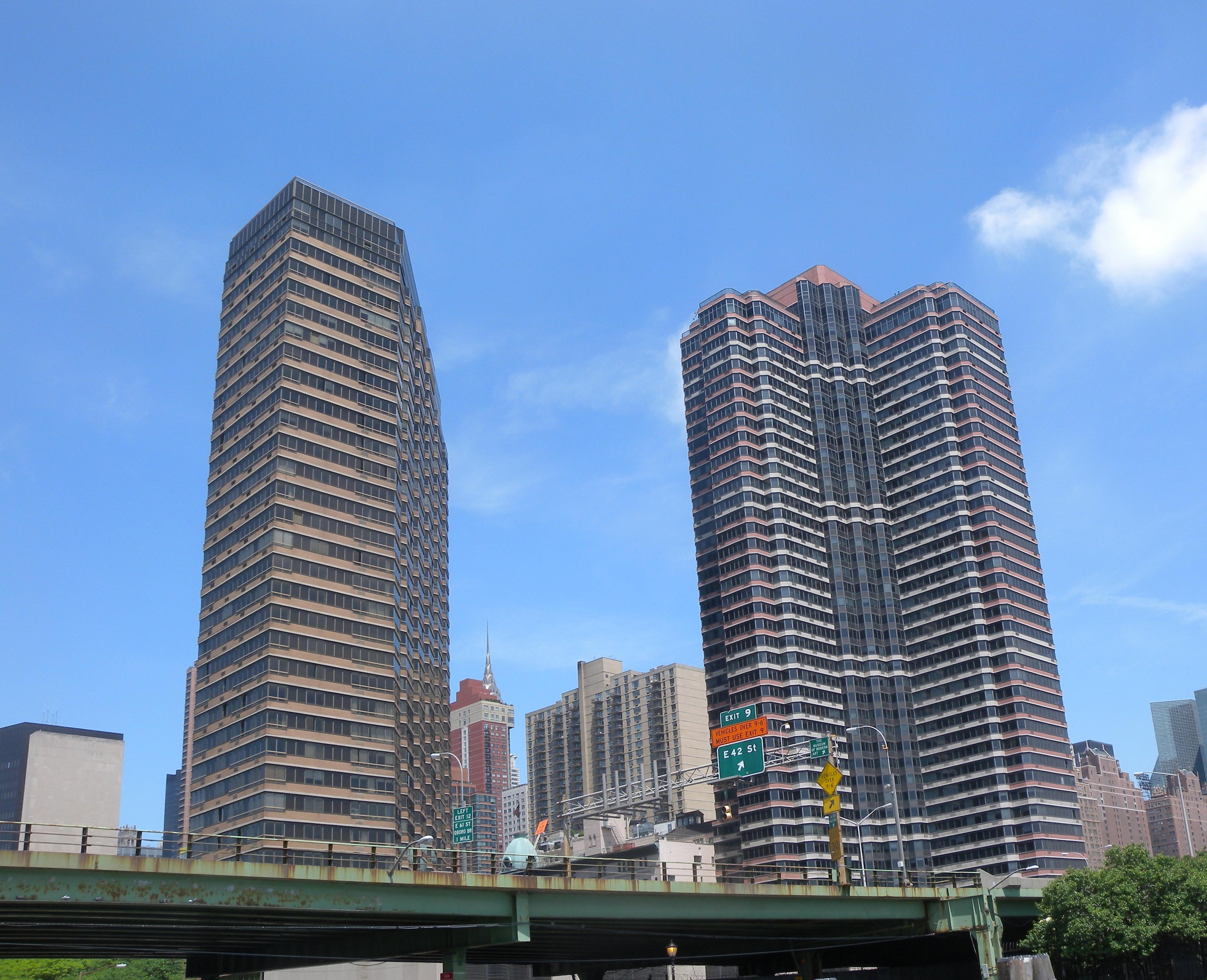
Manhattan Place is located across the street from The Horizon, another high-rise condominium designed by Costas Kondylis for The Glick Organization

Manhattan Place was Kondylis' first success story and his first project in New York City for which he received credit as the design architect. The building caught the attention of Donald Trump, who partnered with Kondylis on the design of other buildings in Manhattan including the Trump World Tower, Trump International Hotel and Tower, and several buildings in Riverside South. Glick partnered again with Kondylis on the design of the Horizon, a 44-story condominium that opened on the block north of Manhattan Place in 1988.

The site includes 16,390 square feet (1,523 m^{2}) of public plaza, most of which is contained within a triangular area at the southwest corner of the block and features a multi-tiered circular fountain located adjacent to the sidewalk along First Avenue. The landscaped plaza was designed by Thomas Balsley Associates, the same firm that designed other nearby public spaces including the renovations to St. Vartan Park, the plaza for The Corinthian, and the East River Esplanade Park from 36th to 38th streets.

== In popular culture ==
- In the 1984 drama movie Falling in Love, Manhattan Place is shown in several scenes as the construction site that Frank is working at.
- Manhattan Place is depicted as the Rutherford Hotel in the Honor Among Thieves episode in the fourth season of the TV series Person of Interest (originally aired on November 11, 2014).
- The rooftop of Manhattan Place was the filming location for a coffee break taken by Dr. Goodwin and Dr. Sharpe on top of Bellevue Hospital in the Rituals episode in the first season of the TV series New Amsterdam (originally aired on October 2, 2018).
- Manhattan Place is referenced in the song "You Drive, I'll Steer" by Cheap Trick.
