= Ruth Kemper =

American violinist (1902–1985)

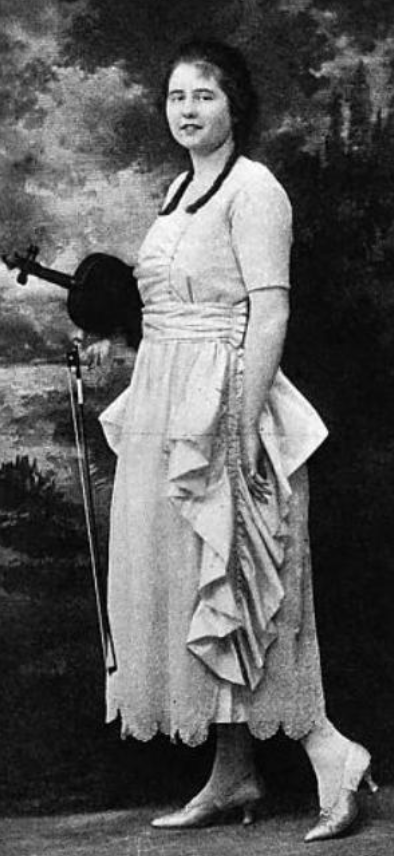
- Ruth Kemper, from a 1920 publication
- Born: July 19, 1902; Salem, West Virginia
- Died: December 31, 1985 (aged 83); New York City
- Occupations: Musician, arts administrator

Ruth Lowther Kemper (July 19, 1902 – December 31, 1985) was an American violinist, music educator, conductor, and arts administrator. She was executive director of the Turtle Bay Music School from 1956 to 1969.

== Early life ==
Kemper was born in Salem, West Virginia. Her father, T. Francis Kemper, taught music at Salem College, and her mother Daisy Lowther Kemper was a clubwoman who was also her concert manager. She began playing violin as a small child in Clarksburg, and was hailed as a musical prodigy. She studied with Theodore Spiering, Charles Martin Loeffler, Eugène Ysaÿe and George Enescu, and won the Lilli Lehmann Medal at the Salzburg Orchestral Academy.

== Career ==
Kemper was a concert violinist as a young woman, based in New York. She and singer Yvonne de Treville gave a concert together in 1920. She gave recitals at Aeolian Hall in 1921, accompanied by Edwin Grasse, and in 1924, accompanied by Arthur Loesser. She played in the National Festival Trio with pianist Kathryn Eyman and cellist Lucille Orell. In 1931, she gave a concert on BBC radio while performing in London. She debuted new works in the 1920s and 1930s, including compositions by Marion Bauer and Virgil Thomson.

Kemper was also known as a conductor and music director. She conducted the Salzburg Orchestra as a young woman. She was music director of the WPA Music School Orchestra in 1935. She was founder and director of the New York Cameo Chamber Orchestra. She taught at the Brooklyn Music School Settlement in the 1920s, and at Turtle Bay Music School from the 1930s. She was the Turtle Bay school's executive director from 1956 to 1969.

Kemper was a founder and president (from 1955 to 1957) of the National Guild of Community Music Schools. She continued teaching violin into the 1970s.

== Personal life ==
Ruth Kemper died in 1985, aged 83 years, at home in New York City.
