= West Side Airlines Terminal =

Former New York City airport terminal

General information
- Location: New York, New York, United States
- Coordinates: 40°45′33″N 73°59′43″W
- Owner: 10-42 Corporation
- Operator: West Side Airlines Terminal Corporation
- Bus operators: Carey Transportation, Inc.

Construction
- Architect: Floyd deL. Brown

History
- Opened: September 15, 1955
- Closed: August 27, 1972
Location

The West Side Airlines Terminal was one of three air terminals in Midtown Manhattan. Located at the southeast corner of Tenth Avenue and West 42nd Street, the terminal operated from 1955 to 1972 and served as a location where passengers could purchase tickets and check baggage before boarding buses that would transport them to Newark Airport. It was later repurposed to accommodate other uses before being demolished to make way for a 63-story mixed-use building, MiMA, that opened in 2011.

== History ==
=== Planning and construction ===
Plans to construct an air terminal on the West Side of Manhattan were first announced in January 1952. At that time, air passenger and bus services for Newark, LaGuardia, and New York International airports were being provided from the 42nd Street Airlines Terminal across from Grand Central Terminal; however, the Triborough Bridge and Tunnel Authority (TBTA) was in the process of constructing the East Side Airlines Terminal adjacent to the Queens–Midtown Tunnel to facilitate travel to LaGuardia and New York International airports in Queens.

The location of the proposed West Side terminal at the southeast corner of Tenth Avenue and West 42nd Street was selected based on its proximity to the Lincoln Tunnel, avoiding the crosstown traffic congestion that was slowing buses traveling between New Jersey and the 42nd Street Airlines Terminal. The location of the new terminal on the West Side was expected to reduce the travel time of buses traveling to and from Newark Airport by twenty minutes. The plans to develop the new terminal were approved by the New York City Planning Commission and the New York City Board of Estimate in 1953.

Unlike the East Side Airlines Terminal, which was publicly developed by TBTA, the West Side Airlines Terminal was constructed by the 10-42 Corporation, a private entity that was jointly owned by Irving Maidman, a major real estate developer on the West Side of Manhattan, and Floyd deL. Brown, an architect and builder who promoted airline terminals in city centers and had previously designed the 42nd Street Airlines Terminal. Most of the property for the terminal had been acquired in 1951. An additional parcel of land on the east side of the terminal, running along the north side of West 41st Street to Dyer Avenue, was acquired from the Port Authority of New York to facilitate off-street loading and unloading of buses. Additional frontage on West 42nd Street to the east of the terminal was acquired to provide an exit ramp to the parking garage located in the basement of the terminal.

Construction of the West Side Airlines Terminal began in February 1954. The new four-story terminal opened to the public on September 15, 1955, and was completed at a cost of $5,000,000. The opening was planned to include a helicopter landing on the terminal's roof by Arthur Godfrey, upon which the broadcaster was to be presented with a scroll for "his contribution to the progress of aviation." This plan was blocked by the New York City Marine and Aviation Department due to safety reasons. The helicopter landing by Godfrey was rescheduled for the following week, but was relocated to take place on the roof of Pier 57.

=== Design and operations ===
The ground floor of the terminal contained a two-story passenger concourse and waiting room lined by airline ticket counters and was accessible by entrances on West 42nd Street and Tenth Avenue. Luggage conveyors located behind the ticket counters were used to transport checked baggage to a dispatching room at the southwest corner of the building. The ground floor also included an information booth, newsstand, restaurant, oyster bar, and cocktail lounge. The second floor contained a balcony around the passenger concourse with restrooms and airline offices. The third and fourth floors of the building were used by American Airlines and Trans World Airlines (TWA), respectively, as reservation offices for ticket purchases in the New York metropolitan area; the building's communication system was equipped to handle 15,000 to 20,000 calls per day. American's reservation offices had been previously located at LaGuardia Airport and the TWA office space at the terminal was also used to manage their transatlantic services. The lower level of the terminal contained a public parking garage for 190 autos.

Bus operations by Carey Transportation, Inc. were accommodated on street level at the south side of the building, which had a 400-foot-long (120 m) covered platform for passenger loading and unloading. Buses traveling from Newark Airport would exit the Lincoln Tunnel via northbound Dyer Avenue and turn left onto West 41st Street to drop off and pick up passengers along the south side of the terminal. To return to the airport, buses continued traveling westbound on West 41st Street, crossed Tenth Avenue, and turned left onto Galvin Avenue to enter the tunnel. The parcel of land that had been acquired by the Port Authority of New York allowed bus loading and unloading operations to occur off-street.

The terminal was operated by the West Side Airlines Terminal Corporation, a private entity composed of airlines that used the facility. Seven airlines began operating at the terminal on opening day: Allegheny, American, Eastern, Mohawk, National, United, and TWA.

In 1965, American Airlines moved its reservations center from the West Side Airlines Terminal to the Chrysler Building. That same year, the garage in the basement of the facility was leased to Avis for use as a rental car facility as well as public parking.

In 1967, a six-month pilot service was initiated to provide non-stop bus service between the West Side Airlines Terminal and Teterboro Airport in an attempt to reduce congestion at Kennedy, LaGuardia, and Newark airports by luring smaller planes to Teterboro and making it more attractive to passengers using private aircraft. The bus service was operated by Carey Transportation under contract to the Port of New York Authority using vehicles with a capacity of 18 passengers. The bus service had very low ridership and was only averaging 144 passengers per week after the first nine weeks of operation.

=== Closure and redevelopment ===
In August 1972, the West Side Airlines Terminal Corporation and the ten airlines operating at the terminal (Allegheny, American, Braniff, Delta, Eastern, National, Northwest, Pan American, TWA and United) announced a decision to close operations at the terminal. A decline in passengers using the facility was cited as a major factor in their decision, which had decreased from more than a million annual passengers to less than 400,000 annual passengers over a three-year period. The airlines also said that their decision was also influenced by a "deterioration" of the surrounding neighborhood, which in part contributed to the decline in passengers. Bus service to the terminal ended on August 27, 1972, and was transferred to the East Side Airlines Terminal the following day.

In the 1970s, airlines were also becoming concerned with the costs of providing airline terminals in downtown areas as they duplicated services that were provided at the airport and more trips were being made between the airports and suburbs instead of airports and the city centers. Airports in the 1970s were also better equipped to handle passenger processing and parking directly at the airports compared to when the terminal had opened in the 1950s and air travel was still an innovative form of transportation.

Although bus service between the West Side Airlines Terminal and Newark Airport had ended, the building was not closed since it had other non-airline tenants, which included office space, a rental car agency, a restaurant, and a record shop. In the late 1970s, the building served as the temporary home of the Lion Theater Company while a new theater was built at its original location on Theater Row. In 1980, the National Recording Studios were added to the lower three floors of the building as the second phase of the Theater Row redevelopment project. The fourth floor of the building was later renovated and used as executive office space by the Spanish International Network.

The terminal became vacant shortly before Hudson Yards was rezoned, was sold to developer Stephen M. Ross of The Related Companies in 2004, and was subsequently demolished and redeveloped with a 63-story mixed-use building named MiMA that was completed in 2011. On the east side of the former terminal, the land along the north side of West 41st Street to Dyer Avenue that had been acquired from the Port of New York Authority for bus loading and unloading was used to construct a ventilation building for the 7 Subway Extension, which opened in 2015.
