= Bernard Spitzer =

American real estate developer (1924–2014)

- Born: Bernard Emmanuel Spitzer; April 26, 1924
- Died: November 1, 2014 (aged 90); New York City, New York, U.S.
- Education: City College of New York (BS); Columbia University (MS)
- Occupation: Real estate developer
- Spouse: Anne Goldhaber
- Children: 3, including Eliot

Bernard Emmanuel Spitzer (April 26, 1924 – November 1, 2014) was an American real estate developer and philanthropist. He was the father of former New York Governor Eliot Spitzer.

== Early life and education ==
Spitzer was born to Molly and Morris Spitzer, both were Austrian-Jewish immigrants who lived in Tulste, Poland (now Ukraine). They moved to New York's Lower East Side after World War I. They operated a print shop. Bernard received an engineering degree from City College of New York in 1943 at the age of 18. He earned a degree in engineering from Columbia University School of Engineering in 1947.

Spitzer initially tried his hand at civil engineering shortly after his graduation from Columbia but turned instead to real estate development (under Spitzer Engineering). Spitzer was based in New York City where he operated apartment buildings and built several landmark buildings around the city including The Corinthian, which was the largest individual apartment building in New York City when it was built.

== Real estate developer ==
Among the buildings Spitzer built are:

- 1020 Park Avenue (1962), a 20-story co-op apartment at East 85th Street and Park Avenue
- 1050 Fifth Avenue (1958), a 20-story residential building at East 86th Street and Fifth Avenue
- 200 Central Park South (1963), a 35-story residential building at Seventh Avenue and Central Park that is noted for its curved walls and a driveway that angles across the front of the building (other buildings along Central Park South are square)
- 210 Central Park South (1966), a 24-story residential building next door to 200 Central Park South
- 985 Fifth Avenue (1968), a 25-story residential building on the site of now demolished the Isaac Vail Brokaw Mansion
- 220 East 72nd Street (1974), a 28-story mixed-use residential-institutional building—the first five of which are occupied by Marymount Manhattan College (where Anne taught)
- 800 Fifth Avenue (1978), a 34-story rental apartment building at 61st Street
- The Corinthian (1988), 57-story 1,100,000-square-foot (100,000 m^{2}) building occupying an entire block between 37th and 38th on First Avenue
- 150 East 57th Street (2000), a 34-story residential building

His New York buildings are leased by his subsidiary Urbana Properties, created in 2005.

In addition, Spitzer purchased several prominent commercial properties over the years, including:

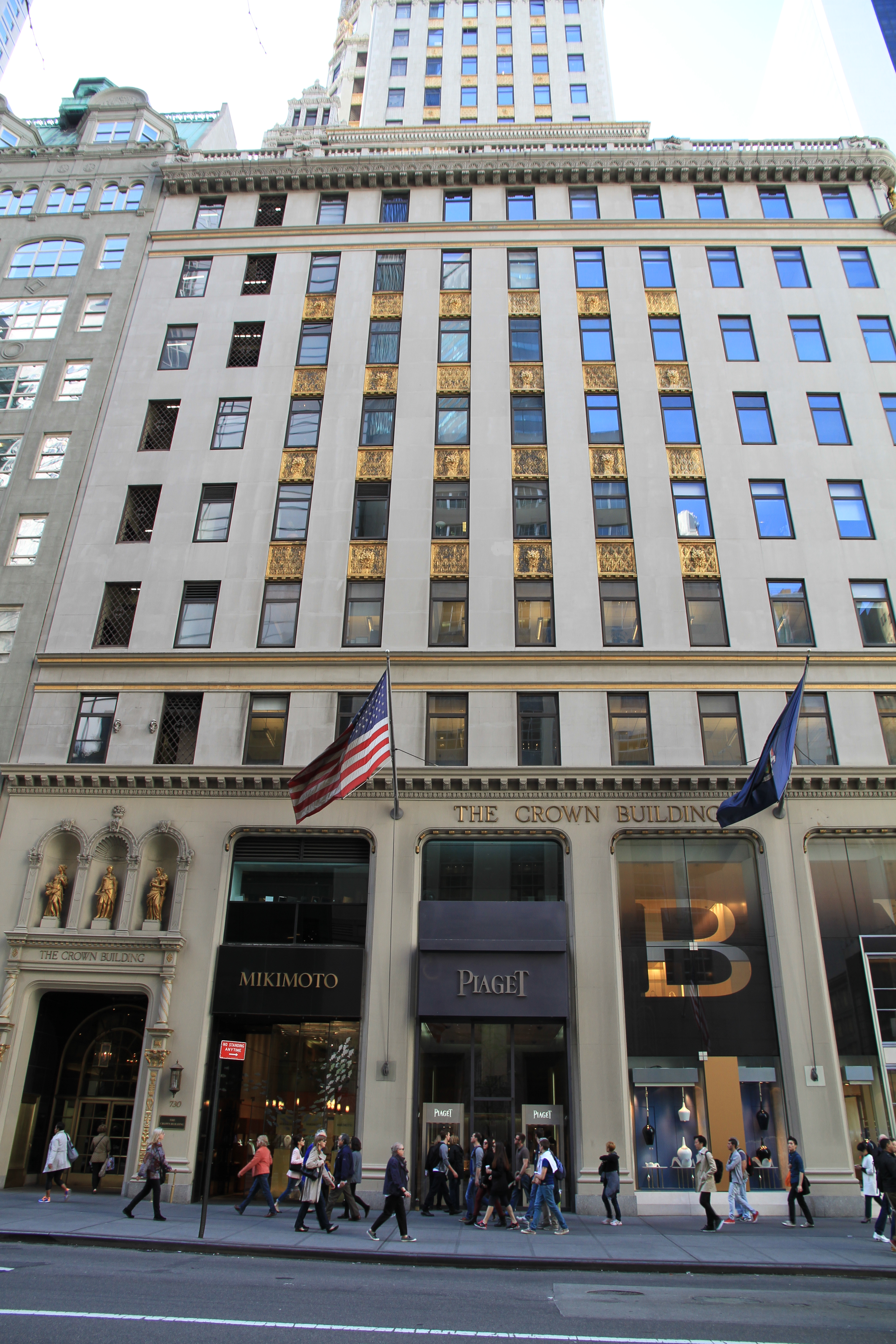
The Crown Building

- 730 Fifth Avenue (The Crown Building or Heckscher Building), New York City, a two-floor neo-classical office building completed in 1921 by Warren & Wetmore and acquired in 1991 for $95 million.
- 2001 K Street (William P. Rogers Building), NW, Washington, D.C., 11-floor commercial and retail building completed in 2000 for $69 million and acquired in 2001 for $95 million.
- 1615 L Street, NW, Washington, D.C., 13-floor post-modern glass curtain wall commercial building completed in 1984 and acquired in 2009 for $180 million.
- 4800 Hampden Lane (One Bethesda Center), Bethesda, Maryland, 13-floor commercial and retail complex completed in 1986 and acquired in 2011 for $90 million.
- 350 West Broadway, New York, NY, 11,000 sf, two-story, retail property acquired in 2013.

== Controversies ==
In 2007, Governor Eliot Spitzer (son of Bernard) appointed Dale Hemmerdinger president of the Metropolitan Transportation Authority. Before being confirmed for that position, Hemmerdinger had to resign from the all-white, mostly Jewish Harmonie Club. It was then revealed that Bernard had been a member of the club for more than 30 years.

Also in August 2007, Republican strategist Roger Stone was accused of leaving this message on Bernard's office answering machine during the "Troopergate" scandal in which his son Eliot was accused of using state troopers to spy on Majority Leader of the New York State Senate Joseph Bruno: "This is a message for Bernard Spitzer. You will be subpoenaed to testify before the Senate committee on investigations on your shady campaign loans. You will be compelled by the Senate sergeant at arms. If you resist this subpoena, you will be arrested and brought to Albany. And there's not a goddamn thing your phony, psycho, piece-of-shit son can do about it. Bernie, your phony loans are about to catch up with you. You will be forced to tell the truth. And the fact that your son's a pathological liar will be known to all." Stone initially denied involvement but eventually resigned as a consultant to the New York State Senate Republican Campaign Committee, at the request of Joseph Bruno.

== Personal life ==
Spitzer was married to Anne Goldhaber whom he courted in the Catskills. They had three children: daughter Emily Spitzer (born 1955), a lawyer, Daniel Spitzer (born 1957), a neurosurgeon, and Eliot Spitzer (born 1959), former New York Governor. According to biographers, during a game of Monopoly between father and son, the elder Spitzer would order his seven- or eight-year-old son, Eliot, to sell him a piece of property, which, later in the game, the future governor could not afford. In this way the father taught his son: "Never defer to authority." To support Eliot's foray into politics, Bernard made a loan to his son of $5 million during the first two campaigns and paid him $200,000 per year. As of 2006, the Bernard and Anne Spitzer Charitable Trust had donated at least $140,000 to organizations led by political allies.

Spitzer's institutional donations included the American Museum of Natural History, City College of New York, and The Public Theater.

== Death ==
Bernard Spitzer died on November 1, 2014, from Parkinson's disease at the age of 90. As of 2008, he had an estimated net worth of $500 million. He left each of his three children $50 million and donated $250 million to the Bernard and Anne Spitzer Charitable trust.
