= 42nd Street Airlines Terminal =

Former New York City airport terminal

42nd Street Airline Terminal
- Interactive map of the 42nd Street Airline Terminal area

General information
- Architectural style: Art Deco
- Location: New York City, New York, United States
- Coordinates: 40.7519°N 73.9783°W
- Opened: January 26, 1941
- Demolished: 1978

Design and construction
- Architect: John B. Peterkin

The 42nd Street Airlines Terminal, on the southwest corner of Park Avenue and 42nd Street in Midtown Manhattan, was the first of three airline terminals constructed in New York City. It was located at the site of the former Hotel Belmont. During this period of aviation, reservations, ticketing and baggage handling took place at this facility for the airlines American, Eastern, TWA, United and Pan Am. Passengers would be transferred by bus to LaGuardia Field, Newark Airport, and later to the New York International Airport.

The changing economics and increasing popularity of air travel eventually led to the creation of new air terminals in Manhattan: the East Side Airlines Terminal near the Queens Midtown Tunnel and the West Side Airlines Terminal near the Lincoln Tunnel. In 1954 this facility, which had become restricted to ticketing only, was renamed the Airlines Building. The declining importance of the facility led to its demolition in 1978, to become the site of the Philip Morris Building at 120 Park Avenue.

The pair of eagles that sat atop the terminal, which had been designed by sculptor Rene Paul Chambellan, were subsequently relocated to the Best Products headquarters in Richmond, Virginia. As of 2026, Best Products' headquarters were being demolished to make way for a mixed-use development anchored by the GreenCity Arena, but the eagles will be preserved onsite or elsewhere.
