= East Side Airlines Terminal =

Former multi-airport terminal in New York City

General information
- Location: 320 East 38th Street; Manhattan, New York; United States
- Coordinates: 40°44′47″N 73°58′22″W
- Owner: Triborough Bridge and Tunnel Authority
- Operator: East Side Airlines Terminal Corporation (1953–1973)
- Bus stands: 15
- Bus operators: Carey Transportation, Inc.

Construction
- Architect: John B. Peterkin
- Architectural style: Modernist

History
- Opened: December 1, 1953
- Closed: March 31, 1984
Location

The East Side Airlines Terminal was one of three air terminals in Midtown Manhattan, New York City. Opening in 1953, and occupying the full block west of 1st Avenue between 37th Street and 38th Street, the East Side Airlines Terminal served as a location where passengers could purchase tickets and check baggage before boarding buses that would transport them to JFK Airport, LaGuardia Airport, or Newark Airport. Bus operations at the terminal ended in 1984. The building was sold to private developers in 1985 and was largely incorporated into the base of The Corinthian, a 57-story apartment building that was constructed on the site.

== History ==
=== Planning and development ===
The East Side Airlines Terminal was the second air terminal constructed in Midtown Manhattan. In 1946, only five years after the 42nd Street Airlines Terminal had opened on Park Avenue across from Grand Central Terminal, plans were announced to construct a new air terminal on the east side of Manhattan to provide bus service to La Guardia Field and Idlewild Airport, the latter of which was being constructed at the time. The site selected for the new terminal was on the west side of First Avenue between 37th and 38th streets, adjacent to the entrance to the Queens–Midtown Tunnel, which would allow buses traveling to and from the two airports in Queens to avoid traffic congestion on streets in the area of the 42nd Street Airlines Terminal.

The new terminal was planned to be completed by 1950 and constructed using private funds by Manhattan Air Terminals, Inc. The site of the future terminal included a vacant parcel of land owned by the Triborough Bridge and Tunnel Authority (TBTA) on the west side of First Avenue, which they agreed to sell to Manhattan Air Terminals, Inc.; and privately owned apartment buildings, stores, and a gas station.

By the end of 1948, most of the property had been acquired, but one of the parcels held out by increasing its selling price each time a purchase offer was made. New York City Mayor William O'Dwyer suggested that the TBTA get involved, and the authority agreed to build the airline terminal provided that modifications were made to the terminal's design and the airlines agreed to several conditions, including signing binding leases for the term of a bond issue, pledging set revenues, and reimbursing the city for lost revenue on property taxes. An agreement between the TBTA and airlines for construction of the new terminal was ultimately reached in August 1950.

=== Design and operations ===
Contracts were signed for financing the new terminal on July 3, 1951, and construction began on July 25, 1951. The terminal, which cost $6,841,000 to construct, was built and owned by the TBTA and leased to the East Side Airlines Terminal Corporation, a private entity composed of ten domestic airlines that used the facility: American, Capital, Colonial, Eastern, National, Northeast, Northwest, Pan American, Trans World and United.

The facility was dedicated on November 30, 1953 and opened the following day; it was designed by architect John B. Peterkin. When the terminal opened on December 1, it was served by 20 major airlines operating at the airports serving New York City. In addition to the 10 domestic airlines that formed the East Side Airlines Terminal Corporation, the other tenants in the terminal included 10 foreign airlines: Air France, British Overseas Airways Corporation, El Al, Linee Aeree Italiane, KLM, Sabena, Scandinavian Airlines System, Swissair, Trans-Canada Air Lines and Linea Aeropostal Venezolana.

The East Side Airlines Terminal, with its immediate proximity to the Queens–Midtown Tunnel, replaced bus service from the 42nd Street Airlines Terminal, which was renamed the Airlines Building and became a ticketing-only facility until it was demolished in 1978. Upon its opening, the East Side Airlines Terminal became the sole point of arrival and departure for all airport buses providing service to and from Manhattan, consolidating bus operations to a single location. Other buses that had been providing service between the airports and various airline ticket offices located in Midtown Manhattan were also discontinued. The airlines had been forced to open up ticket offices in other Manhattan locations because they had outgrown the space available in the 42nd Street Airlines Terminal due to the growth in air travel. Buses traveling between the airports and the East Side Airlines Terminal via the Queens–Midtown Tunnel brought in additional revenue to the TBTA from the tolls they paid to use the tunnel; previously buses traveling to and from the 42nd Street Airlines Terminal had crossed the East River for free using the Queensboro Bridge.

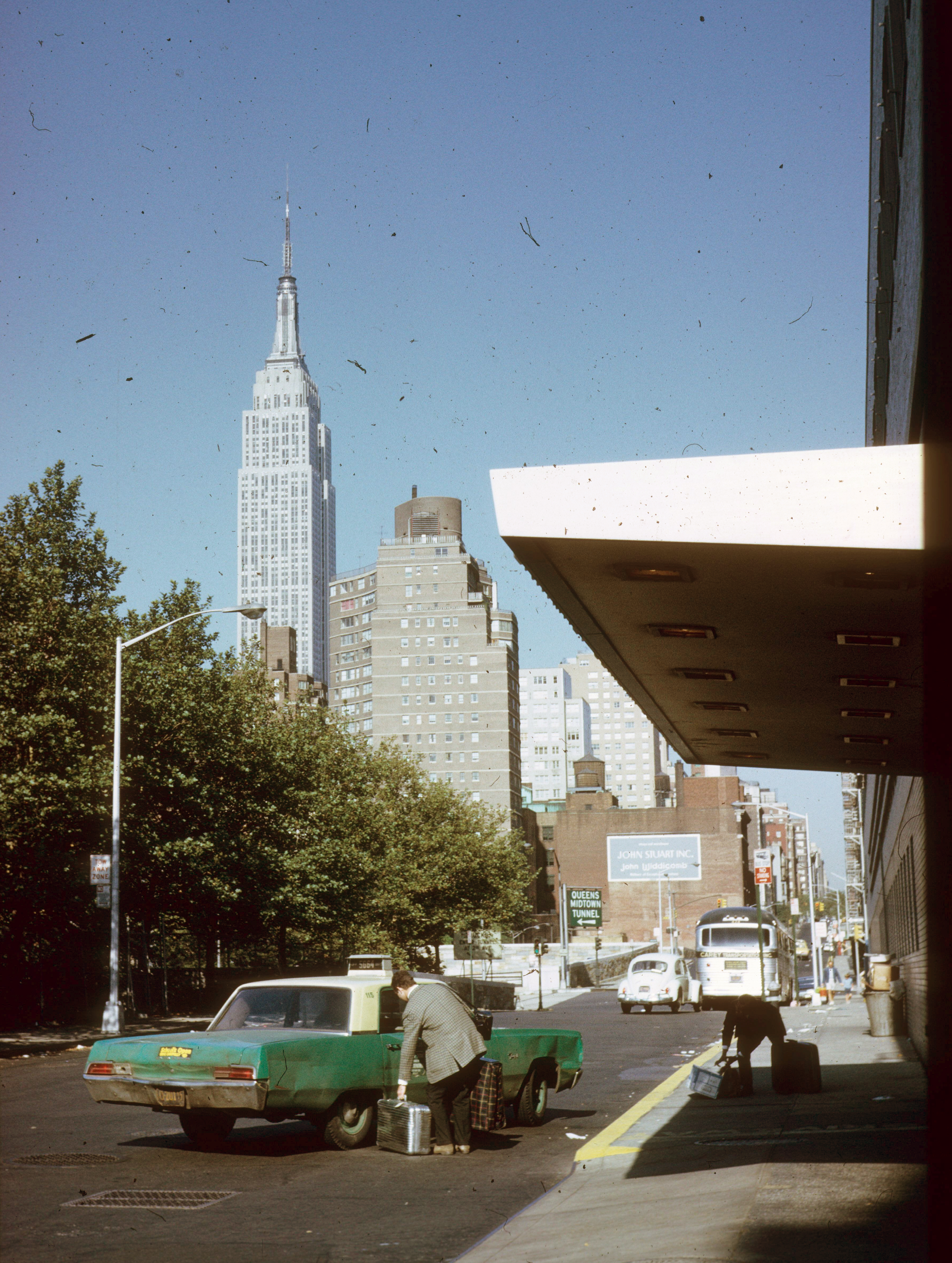
A taxi stops for a passenger outside the entrance to the terminal on 37th Street in 1968

At the East Side Airlines Terminal, passengers entered from the east or west sides of the building and took escalators or stairs to a rotunda on the second floor, which was a large hall lined with domestic airline ticket counters and bus gates. A through-block taxiway and pedestrian arcade was located on the east side of the building, running between 37th and 38th streets, and another taxi driveway was provided along a portion of Tunnel Approach Street near the southwestern corner of the terminal. Buses would enter the western portion of the building from 38th Street, drive up a ramp to a U-shaped roadway around the second floor that contained 15 passenger loading platforms, and descend a ramp to exit the western portion of the building on 37th Street across from the entrance to the Queens–Midtown Tunnel. A mezzanine level above the rotunda included ticket counters for international air carriers and office space. The rooftop included 275 public parking spaces that were accessed by autos via a separate entrance and ramp at the northwest corner of the building. A bus garage and repair and servicing facilities were located in the basement. The rooftop was designed to accommodate helicopters if the development of a heliport became necessary in the future.

Although the 42nd Street Airlines Terminal and the East Side Airlines Terminal shared the same architect, the design of the latter was less ambitious. Architectural critic Lewis Mumford favored Peterkin's avoidance of creating a monumental structure for the East Side Airlines Terminal and said, "The terminal is so emphatically inexpressive, so ostentatiously neutral, that a motorist in search of it, approaching from the south, might easily whiz past it under the impression that it was merely a supermarket or a parking garage." The building's facade consisted of gray brickwork on the ground floor and white glazed bricks on the upper floors, with a series of openings and horizontal limestone slabs forming grilles to provide ventilation to the bus platforms and roadway on the second floor. Rows of square windows were located on the upper part of the facade, next to the office space on the mezzanine level. Mumford also thought that the design of the East Side Airlines Terminal was an improvement compared to the Port Authority Bus Terminal, noting that "there is a greater unity in the exterior and a more serene handling of the inner space". He described a passenger's perception of arriving in the East Side Airlines Terminal's main hall as "one has at first a great sense of spacious tranquility" and admired the selection of the interior colors (which included red columns contrasting with blue and white ceilings) and the quality of the terminal's interior lighting.

Bus service from the East Side Airlines Terminal to Newark Airport was discontinued when the West Side Airlines Terminal opened in 1955. The location of the new terminal on the West Side near the Lincoln Tunnel eliminated the need for buses to travel crosstown on 42nd Street and shortened the travel time from 40 minutes to 21 minutes. In 1960, National Airlines began a trial of using a "baggage express" system in which passengers traveling from Miami to New York International Airport could check their baggage through to the East Side Airlines Terminal and did not have to claim their baggage at the airport before boarding buses to Manhattan. At that time, 30 percent of the passengers traveling on the flights from Miami were using buses to the East Side Airlines Terminal. The through baggage service was never permanently implemented at the East Side Airlines Terminal or any other remote airport terminals due to technical problems.

In the late 1960s, the Port of New York Authority had proposed enlarging the East Side Airlines Terminal by decking over First Avenue and extending the facility to the East River. The plan arose as a result of a feasibility study that the Port of New York Authority had been working on with the TBTA and city to construct a 2,000-space parking garage with a rooftop heliport located on the blocks to the east of the terminal. The combined heliport and parking facility was never built because a practicable means to finance the project could not be identified.

=== Closure and redevelopment ===
By the early 1970s, most airlines had acquired better ticketing and baggage handling facilities at the airports and more air passengers were traveling to or from the suburbs rather than having trip origins or destinations in Manhattan. The West Side terminal closed in 1972 and the East Side terminal was itself threatened with closure the following year when the airlines refused to renew their original 20-year lease. Closure of the East Side terminal was opposed by elected officials and civic groups, which led to negotiations by the city to prevent the terminal from closing. The TBTA agreed to keep the terminal open for three additional months while working out plans to continue operations; at that time the terminal was operating at an annual deficit of about $750,000. Airline ticketing and check-in services were discontinued in December 1973. Bus fares were subsequently increased to enable the facility to break even and remain in operation as a bus terminal providing service to the airports.

On January 21, 1973, Federal Bureau of Investigation agents recovered two diamond-studded crowns and other jewels from the terminal receiving a phone call from a man that said, "The package you want is in the East Side Air Terminal, locker 112." The items had been stolen from the Regina Pacis Votive Shrine of St. Rosalia's Church in Brooklyn 12 days earlier. The same crowns had also been stolen from the church nearly twenty years beforehand, after they had been recently blessed by Pope Pius XII.

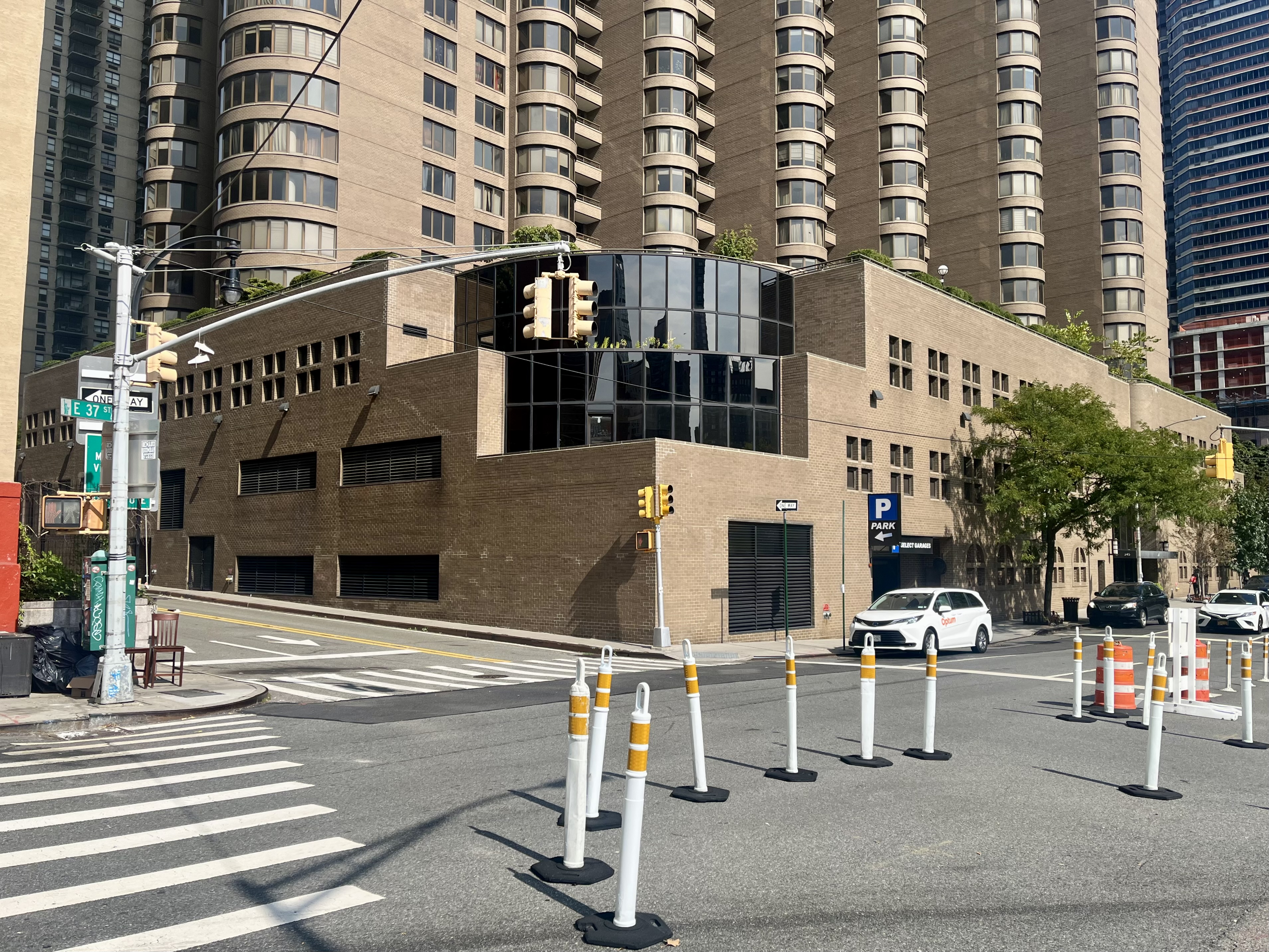
Most of the former terminal was retained and incorporated into the base of a 57-story apartment building.

In 1975, the TBTA solicited expressions of interest for parties to lease up to a total of 201,000 square feet (18,700 m^{2}) in several parts of the terminal not needed for bus operations, including portions of the roof, mezzanine, terminal floor, and basement. The following year the terminal's rooftop parking was converted to a tennis facility operated by the Murray Hill Racquet Club. The club had ten Har-Tru courts in two pressurized air bubbles. The tennis facility also planned to include squash, handball and racquetball courts on a lower level of the building.

The East Side Airlines Terminal was used as a filming location for the 1981 thriller movie Ms .45 and the 1985 comedy-drama film Desperately Seeking Susan. Diminished volumes of passengers using the facility during the early 1980s facilitated the filming of scenes set at bus terminals, compared to other locations such as the Port Authority Bus Terminal.

A report issued by New York City Comptroller Harrison J. Goldin in 1982 recommended that the city should negotiate new terms with the TBTA or the agency should relocate the terminal and sell the building because it was producing inadequate revenue. At the time, the Murray Hill Racquet Club was leasing 75 percent of the terminal and subleasing about 185,000 square feet (17,200 m^{2}) to a Werner Erhard est center. Eventually Carey vacated the terminal on March 31, 1984 and moved its bus operations to the Port Authority Bus Terminal, leaving the East Side terminal operating primarily as rental space for various tenants, including the tennis club and est center. The TBTA turned away requests from Fugazy Express and Olympia Trails to operate bus service within the terminal because the agency didn't want take on the burden of new leases as it explored selling or leasing the site to a developer.

In 1985 the property was sold to a private developer for $90.6 million at an auction and became the eventual site of The Corinthian, a 57-story apartment building. At the time, the only occupants remaining at the terminal included the tennis club, the parking garage, a coffee shop, and administrative offices of the New York City Department of Transportation. Most of the structure of the former terminal was retained and incorporated into the base of the new development as office space.
