= Der Scutt =

American architect (1934–2010)

- Born: Donald Clark Scutt; October 17, 1934; Wyomissing, Pennsylvania, U.S.
- Died: March 14, 2010 (aged 75); Manhattan, New York City, U.S.
- Education: Yale University
- Occupation: Architect
- Spouses: Cornelia Kubler (m. 1961, divorced); Leena Liukkonen (m. 1967)
- Awards: Service Award (Illuminating Engineering Society, 1976)
- Practice: Edward Durell Stone (1961); Paul Rudolph (1962–1965); Kahn and Jacobs (1965–1975); Poor Swanke Hayden & Connell Architects (1976–1981)
- Buildings: Trump Tower
- Design: One Astor Plaza

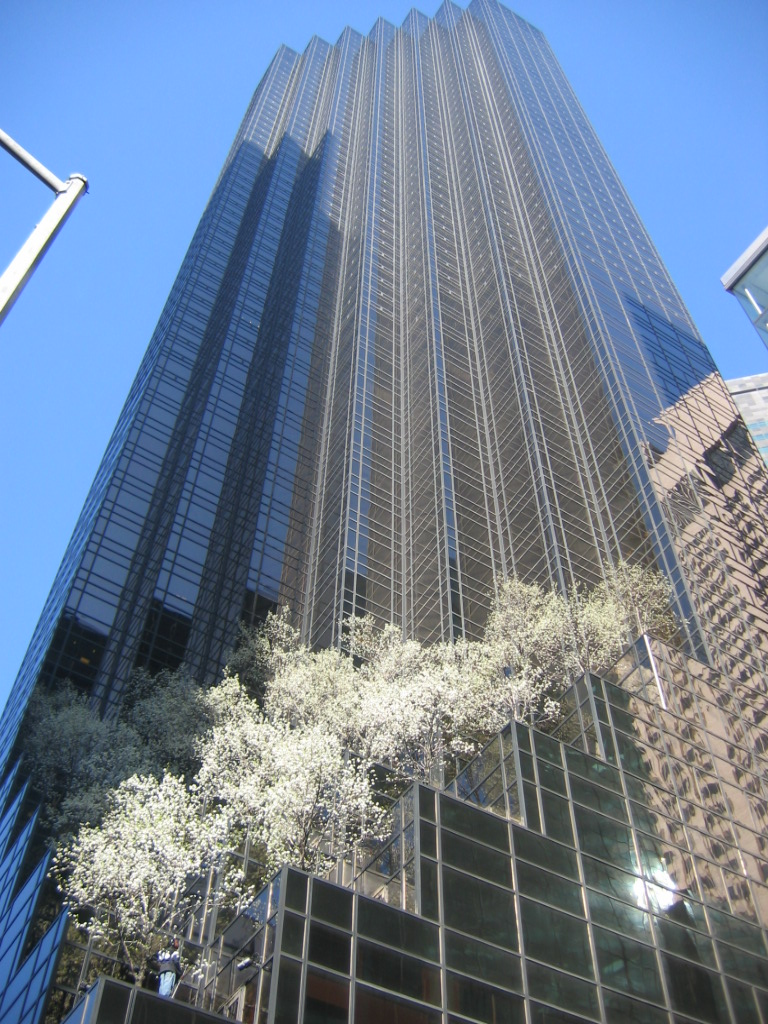
Trump Tower viewed from 5th Avenue

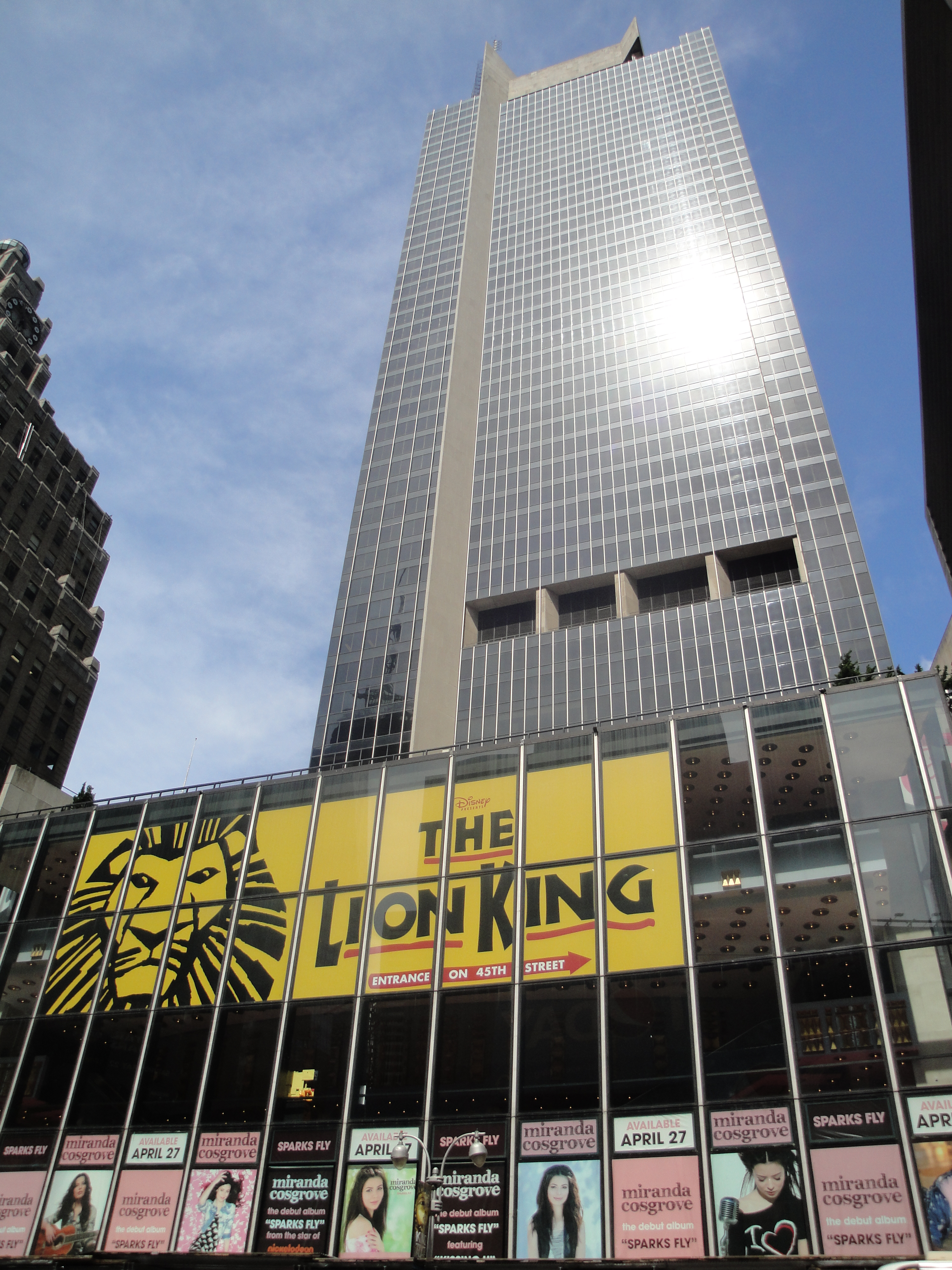
One Astor Plaza

Der Scutt (October 17, 1934 – March 14, 2010) was an American architect and designer of several major buildings throughout New York City and the United States.

Scutt worked on Trump Tower next to the Tiffany & Co. flagship store on Fifth Avenue, New York City, developed by Donald Trump. His other major buildings include One Astor Plaza, 520 Madison Avenue, the Continental Insurance Corporation headquarters in New York City, and the Northwestern Mutual Life Insurance Company Headquarters in Milwaukee. He was the design consultant for the Grand Hyatt New York.

== Biography ==
Scutt was born Donald Clark Scutt in Wyomissing, Pennsylvania, in 1934, near Reading. He attended the Wyomissing Polytechnic Institute and Penn State University. After working with Philip Johnson for a year, he transferred and received his master's degree in architecture from Yale University.

In 1961 he joined Edward Durell Stone. From 1962 to 1965, Scutt worked for Paul Rudolph and managed Rudolph's New York office. From 1965 to 1975, Scutt was an associate with Kahn and Jacobs, where he designed One Astor Plaza. He joined Poor Swanke Hayden & Connell Architects in 1975 and was a partner in charge of design there from 1976 to 1981. Der Scutt began his own private practice in 1981.

Scutt established his own firm, Der Scutt Architect, in 1981 and was awarded an impressive group of commissions, including the 55-story 100 United Nations Plaza Tower luxury condominium, the 57-story Corinthian luxury condominium in New York City, HSBC Bank USA headquarters in New York City, and the Roure Bertrand Dupont United States headquarters in New Jersey. Scutt's major high rise office building renovations include those at 505 Park Avenue, 625 Madison Avenue, 575 Lexington Avenue, 1633 Broadway, 57 West 57th Street, 823 United Nations Plaza, 555 Fifth Avenue, the world corporate headquarters of International Flavors and Fragrances, and 1615 L Street in Washington, D.C.

Scutt participated actively as an author, lecturer, teacher, and officer in a variety of professional organizations. He was vice-chairman of the New York Building Congress for five years. He was the 1976 recipient of the Illuminating Engineering Society's Distinguished Service Award and was the first architect to receive that award. In 1979 he was elected to the prestigious and coveted Fellow Grade of the Illuminating Engineering Society of North America (I.E.S.N.A.) Scutt was a fellow of the American Institute of Architects.

As the project designer for numerous corporate and institutional buildings and interiors, Scutt's work has been published in magazines, newspapers, professional journals and popular magazines — both in the United States and internationally. In November 1981, The New York Times Magazine cover photograph included Scutt as one of New York City's prominent master architects, along with John Burgee, Cesar Pelli, Philip Johnson, Edward Barnes, and Raúl de Armas. In 1984, two magazines, Interiors and The Designer, published cover stories on Scutt.

In 1987 Der Scutt was selected by a group of prestigious architects to be included in the international bibliography, Contemporary Architects. He was a visiting critic in architectural design at Harvard University, Yale University, and Washington University in St. Louis. He also served on numerous design juries for the AIA, IESNA, Concrete Industry Board of New York, Progressive Architecture and The Tucker National Architecture Awards.

In 1989, Scutt bought his first ship model at a flea market and amassed one of the most unusual private nautical collections in the world. His collection spanned four centuries, including ocean liners, warships, commercial ships, sailing ships, and paddle steamers. The models came from all over the world. Articles on his collection of over six hundred models appeared in The New York Times, The Journal of Commerce, Town & Country, Nautical Collector, and other publications. In 2001 the South Street Seaport Museum acquired the Der Scutt Collection of Ocean Liner models and memorabilia.

In 1996, the Reading Public Museum featured a major retrospective exhibit of Der Scutt's work and published the first comprehensive book on his work.

Scutt was a trustee of the South Street Seaport Museum from 1991 to 2006, and a trustee of the South Street Seaport Museum Foundation until his death. He was formerly a trustee of the Ocean Liner Museum of New York, the Maritime Industry Museum and the National Maritime Historical Society.

== Death ==
Der Scutt died of liver failure at his home in Manhattan on March 14, 2010.

== Completed projects ==
Following is a partial list of his completed projects

- 1971 South Central Bell Building, Birmingham, Alabama
- 1972 One Astor Plaza, New York, New York
- 1972 Roure Bertrand Dupont HQ (now Givaudan), Teaneck, New Jersey
- 1979 Northwestern Mutual Place Milwaukee, Wisconsin
- 1980 Grand Hyatt New York, New York, New York
- 1982 520 Madison Avenue, New York, New York
- 1983 Continental Center, 180 Maiden Lane, New York, New York
- 1983 Trump Tower, New York, New York
- 1985 505 Park Avenue, New York, New York
- 1985 HSBC Bank USA headquarters, New York, New York
- 1986 100 United Nations Plaza Tower, New York, New York
- 1988 Revlon Building, 625 Madison Avenue, New York, New York
- 1988 The Corinthian, New York, New York
- 1988 The Milan, 118 West 23rd Street, New York, New York
- 1989 International Flavors and Fragrances Creative Center, Hazlet, New Jersey
- 1991 575 Lexington Avenue, New York, New York
- 1995 555 Fifth Avenue, New York, New York
- 1995 International Flavors and Fragrances World Headquarters, New York, New York
- 1998 Addition to Reading Public Museum, Reading, Pennsylvania
- 1998 40 Wall Street, The Trump Building New York, New York (block-through lobby renovation)
- 2003 381 Park Avenue South, New York, New York
- 2006 Symrise Fine Fragrance Studio, New York, New York
- 2010 1615 L Street, N.W., Washington, D.C.

== Unbuilt designs ==
- 1987 Williamsburg Bridge Replacement, New York, New York
- 1988 Reading Renaissance Tower, Reading, Pennsylvania
- 1996 Houston Street Hotel, New York, New York

== In popular culture ==
In the satirical 2016-movie Donald Trump's The Art of the Deal: The Movie Scutt was portrayed by Jack McBrayer.
