= Turtle Bay Music School =

Former community music school in Manhattan, New York

Coordinates: 40°44′48″N 73°58′23″W

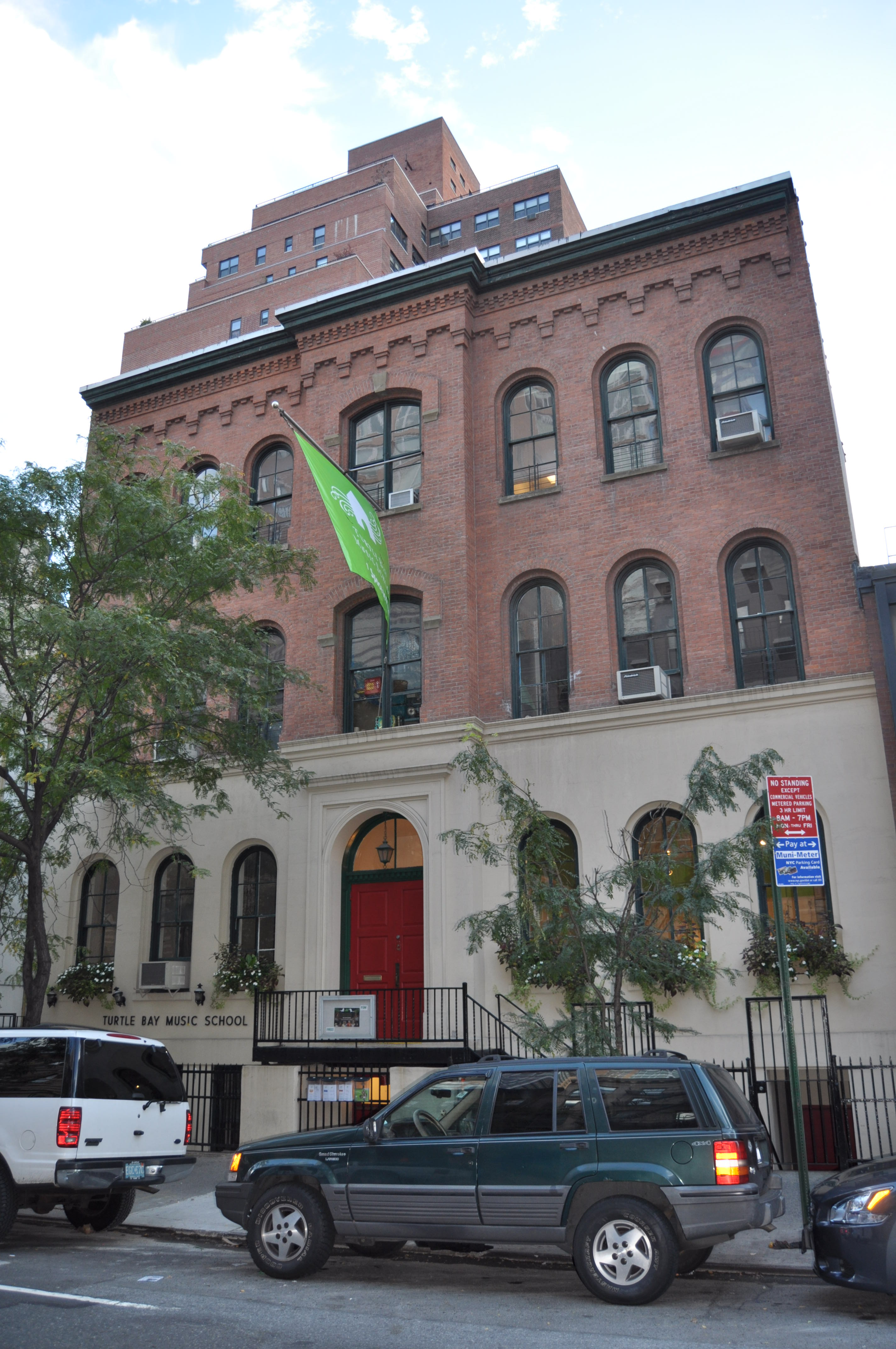
- The exterior of the school building in 2009, when it was located at 244 East 52nd Street

Information
- Type: Private
- Established: 1925
- Founder: Eleanor Stanley White
- Closed: January 29, 2020

Turtle Bay Music School was a community music school located on the East Side of Manhattan in New York City. Originally established in 1925 at the Grosvenor Neighborhood House on East 49th Street in Turtle Bay, the school later purchased a three-story building on East 52nd Street and operated at that location for over 80 years. In addition to providing musical instruction, Turtle Bay Music School also offered classes and workshops in expressive therapies involving art, dance, drama and music. The institution sold its property to a private developer in 2018 and moved to a newly renovated space on East 38th Street in Murray Hill, but closed less than two years after relocating due to financial difficulties.

== History ==
=== Opening and early years ===
Turtle Bay Music School was established in 1925 by Eleanor Stanley White. Classes were initially held at the Grosvenor Neighborhood House, a settlement house located at 321 East 49th Street between First and Second avenues in the Turtle Bay neighborhood of Manhattan in New York City. At the time of its opening, it was the only school providing music classes within an 80-block-long area on Manhattan's East Side. Within three years, enrollment had surpassed 50 students and the school began to outgrow its space. In July 1934, Turtle Bay Music School purchased a three-story building at 244 to 246 East 52nd Street, located between Second and Third avenues; the building had been constructed in the mid-1860s and originally accommodated the German-American School Society. Plans to convert the structure into a music conservatory were filed in April 1935 by architect W. Stanwood Phillips.

The first classes at the school's new location on East 52nd Street were held on October 14, 1935. After leaving its mother settlement house, the school became a member of the National Guild of Community Music Schools, an organization established in 1937 for schools that were not connected with a settlement house or another group. In 1952, a 250-seat recital hall opened in the basement of the school and was named after Alma Gluck, who had served as a board member for the school. Eleanor Stanley White retired from her position as the school's director in 1956 and was succeeded by Ruth Kemper, who started working at the school as an instructor in the 1930s and headed the school until 1969. Kemper had also helped to found the National Guild of Community Music Schools and served as that organization's president from 1955 to 1957.

Turtle Bay Music School began offering a course in music therapy to 13 students in 1954. The following year, the school hosted a full day conference on music therapy that included participants from the Bronx Veterans Hospital, Essex County Overbrook Hospital, United Hospital Fund of New York and Veterans' Administration. The school's music therapy course subsequently evolved into an "Arts-In-Therapy" program with classes and workshops in other expressive therapies involving art, dance and drama. The program catered to individuals working as therapists in schools, hospitals, nursing homes, community health centers and drug rehabilitation centers. By 1974, enrollment in the school's "Arts-In-Therapy" program had grown to 113 students.

During the latter part of the twentieth century, a total of 500 students were attending the school—70 percent of which were adults—and the faculty consisted of 50 teachers. Private instruction in music and singing was the most successful program at the institution.

=== Relocation and closure ===
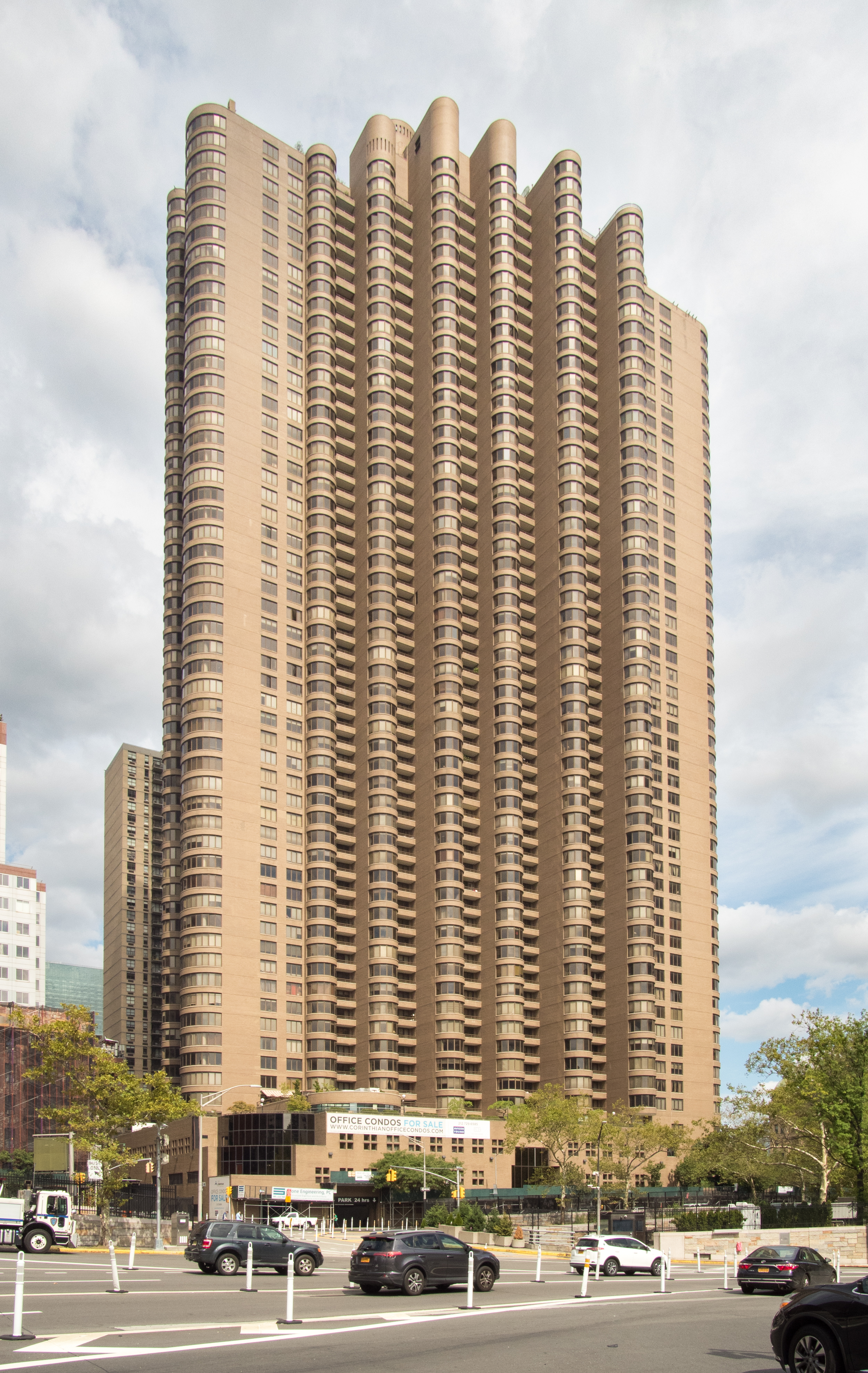
The Corinthian at 330 East 38th Street, the school's location from 2018 to 2020

The school's aging building on East 52nd Street became expensive to maintain and also had other issues, such as the need for everyone to climb eight steps to reach the building's front door, no elevator to serve the upper/basement levels and a lack of soundproof studios. A full-scale renovation of the building was not undertaken because it would have been costly, necessitated provisions for accessibility in compliance with the Americans with Disabilities Act of 1990 (ADA) and left little room available for an expansion. The school's board of directors felt that an expansion would be necessary to offer new programs, such as a preschool to increase revenues and serve as a "feeder" for the school's other offerings. The property's air rights were also limited, which precluded the site from being sold to a developer with space for the school provided in the new building. In 2018, Turtle Bay Music School sold its building to a developer for $11 million and relocated to The Corinthian, a 57-story building located at 330 East 38th Street between First and Second avenues in Murray Hill.

The school spent $15 million to purchase two office condominiums on the ground floor of The Corinthian and renovate a former medical office into a school containing 5 classrooms, 13 practice rooms/studios and a 161-seat recital hall. The ADA–compliant facility was contained on a single floor with its own street-level entrance and also included a gallery, library, lounge, meeting rooms, offices and a piano lab. The second office condominium was being rented out as a doctor's office, but was planned to be used as expansion space following the end of the lease. Overall, both office condominiums contained approximately 14,000 square feet (1,300 m^{2}) of usable space, 50 percent larger than the school's prior location.

Turtle Bay Music School opened at its new location on East 38th Street in September 2018. The following fall, it planned to begin offering a music-oriented preschool program for children two through five years old. However, the school's presence in Murray Hill was short-lived and the school shut down on January 29, 2020, with its board of directors citing "changing times in the cultural and educational landscape" and "society's shifting priorities" that made its "business model no longer sustainable". The school's closure was a result of several factors, including a loss of one-third its enrollment at the new location and New York City's introduction and expansion of universal pre-kindergarten (Pre-K) and 3K programs under Mayor Bill de Blasio. Some of the faculty members and students had also expressed concerns about the school's new site, such as its distance to public transportation services, location alongside an access road leading to the Queens–Midtown Tunnel, and limited visibility within the new neighborhood.

Both of the school's office condominiums at The Corinthian were sold in 2022 for $12 million. The school's former location on East 38th Street was later converted into a Pre-K center operated by the New York City Department of Education. Meanwhile, the former site of the Turtle Bay Music School on East 52nd Street was redeveloped into a seven-story condominium called "Minuet" that was completed in 2024. As of 2024, there have been discussions by community members about potentially reopening the Turtle Bay Music School at a new location, a project which could involve the use of public funding.
