= Belmont Hotel (New York City) =

Hotel in Manhattan, New York (1908–1939)

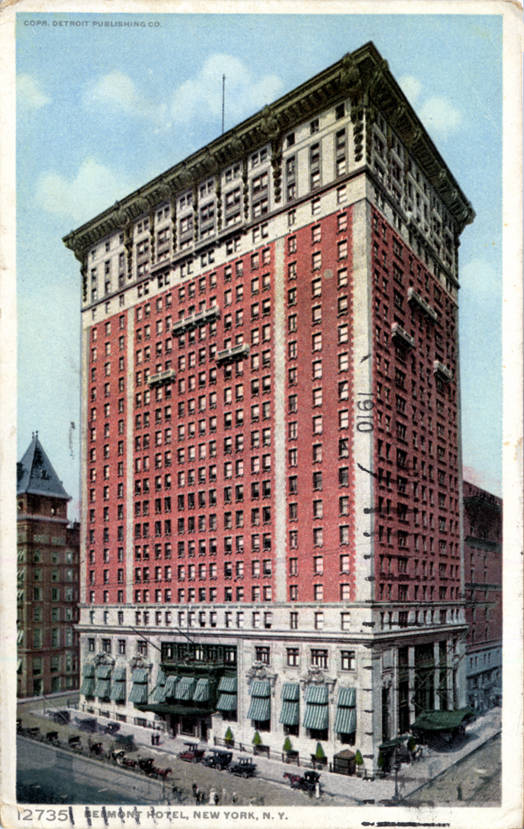
- Interactive map of the Belmont Hotel area

General information
- Coordinates: 40°45′7″N 73°58′42″W
- Construction started: 1904
- Construction stopped: 1908
- Opened: 1908
- Demolished: 1939

Height
- Height: 308 feet (94 m)

The Belmont Hotel was an early 20th-century skyscraper-like hotel at Park Avenue and 42nd Street in Midtown Manhattan, New York City. The Belmont Hotel was built between 1904 and 1908. At 308 feet (94 m), it was the tallest hotel in the world when built and was demolished in 1939. The 42nd Street Airlines Terminal was built in its place.

== Sources ==
- Emporis.com
- Turkel, Stanley (January 1, 2009). Great American Hoteliers: Pioneers of the Hotel Industry. AuthorHouse. ISBN 9781449007522.
