= Falling in Love (1984 film) =

1984 film by Ulu Grosbard

- Theatrical release poster
- Directed by: Ulu Grosbard
- Written by: Michael Cristofer
- Produced by: Marvin Worth
- Starring: Robert De Niro; Meryl Streep; Dianne Wiest; David Clennon; Jane Kaczmarek; George Martin; Harvey Keitel
- Cinematography: Peter Suschitzky
- Edited by: Michael Kahn
- Music by: Dave Grusin
- Distributed by: Paramount Pictures
- Release date: November 21, 1984
- Running time: 106 minutes
- Country: United States
- Language: English
- Budget: $12 million
- Box office: $11.1 million (domestic)

Falling in Love is a 1984 American romantic drama film directed by Ulu Grosbard, written by Michael Cristofer and starring Robert De Niro and Meryl Streep. Released on November 21, 1984, the film received mixed reviews from critics and grossed $11 million.

== Plot ==
On Christmas Eve, commercial artist Molly Gilmore and architectural engineer Frank Raftis are both separately doing last-minute Christmas shopping in Manhattan. Frank meets his colleague Ed for drinks, and Ed tells Frank that he is getting divorced. Molly sees her friend Isabelle, who is married but plans to spend Christmas with another man. Molly also visits her sick father. Later that day, at the counter in a hectic bookstore, Frank and Molly mix up their packages, so on Christmas Day, Molly's husband Brian and Frank's wife Ann both open the book meant for the other.

Three months later, Frank and Molly, who commute to Manhattan from adjacent stops on the Metro-North Hudson Line, run into each other on the morning train. They struggle to place each other, but Frank soon remembers and reminds her of the confusion over the books. Later that day, Frank's boss asks him to take a job in Houston, while Molly visits her father in hospital. Molly tells Isabelle about Frank; Frank tells Ed about Molly. That evening, Frank waits for Molly at Grand Central Terminal. They talk and agree to meet on the morning train later that week.

Against their better judgement, Frank and Molly grow closer. They see more of each other until one afternoon, Frank takes Molly to Ed's apartment. They begin to make love, but Molly cannot continue it. They agree that they must stop seeing each other.

When Molly returns home, Brian gives her the news that her father has died. At the funeral, she has a panic attack. Convalescing, she tells Isabelle that it is not grief for her father from which she is suffering, but the loss of Frank. Meanwhile, Frank agrees to take the job in Houston. He tells Ann about the job change, but she inquires about the sudden difficulties of their marriage. When he confesses about his relationship with Molly, Ann is taken aback and decides to leave, taking the children to Denver to live with her mother.

On the night when he is due to leave, Frank calls Molly at home. Frank asks to see her before he goes, but as Brian stands listening, she ends the call. Unable to resist, she tells Brian that she must see Frank one more time and rushes to her car. Driving fast in the pouring rain, she nearly collides with a train at a crossing and misses her chance. Meanwhile, Frank tries to call her again but her husband answers the phone and says that she does not want to talk to Frank.

The following Christmas season, Frank meets Ed for lunch and tells him that he and Ann are now separated; she living in Denver and he continuing to live in Houston. Frank is planning to sell the Dobbs Ferry home and return to Texas. Molly meets Isabelle, and it is clear from their conversation that her marriage to Brian has failed too. Frank makes a stop at the bookstore at which he and Molly first met. Coincidentally, Molly is there at the same time. They talk but, uncertain how things now stand between them, go their separate ways. Walking away from the store, Frank stops, turns and runs after her. A short time later on a crowded train out of Grand Central, he finds her again. They embrace.

== Cast ==
- Robert De Niro as Frank Raftis
- Meryl Streep as Molly Gilmore
- Harvey Keitel as Ed Lasky
- Jane Kaczmarek as Ann Raftis
- George Martin as John Trainer
- David Clennon as Brian Gilmore
- Dianne Wiest as Isabelle
- Victor Argo as Victor Rawlins
- Jesse Bradford as Joe Raftis
- Roganda Mart as Anji

== Production ==
=== Filming locations ===
The entire film takes place in the New York City metropolitan area and its suburbs. There are scenes in locations including Grand Central Station, Manhattan Place, Rizzoli Bookstore, the Hudson River train line, Englewood, New Jersey, and Dobbs Ferry, New York.

== Reception ==
=== Critical response ===
Falling in Love holds a rating of 50% on Rotten Tomatoes, based on 14 reviews.

Roger Ebert of the Chicago Sun-Times gave the movie 2 stars out of 4, citing various plot clichés and stunted dialogue as his reason, despite the respectful chemistry between the famous actors.

=== Awards and nominations ===
Year	Award	Category	Recipient(s)	Result	Ref(s)
1985	David di Donatello Awards	Best Foreign Actress	Meryl Streep	Won	
1986	Sant Jordi Awards	Best Foreign Actor	Robert De Niro	Won	
