= St. Vartan Park =

Public park in Manhattan, New York

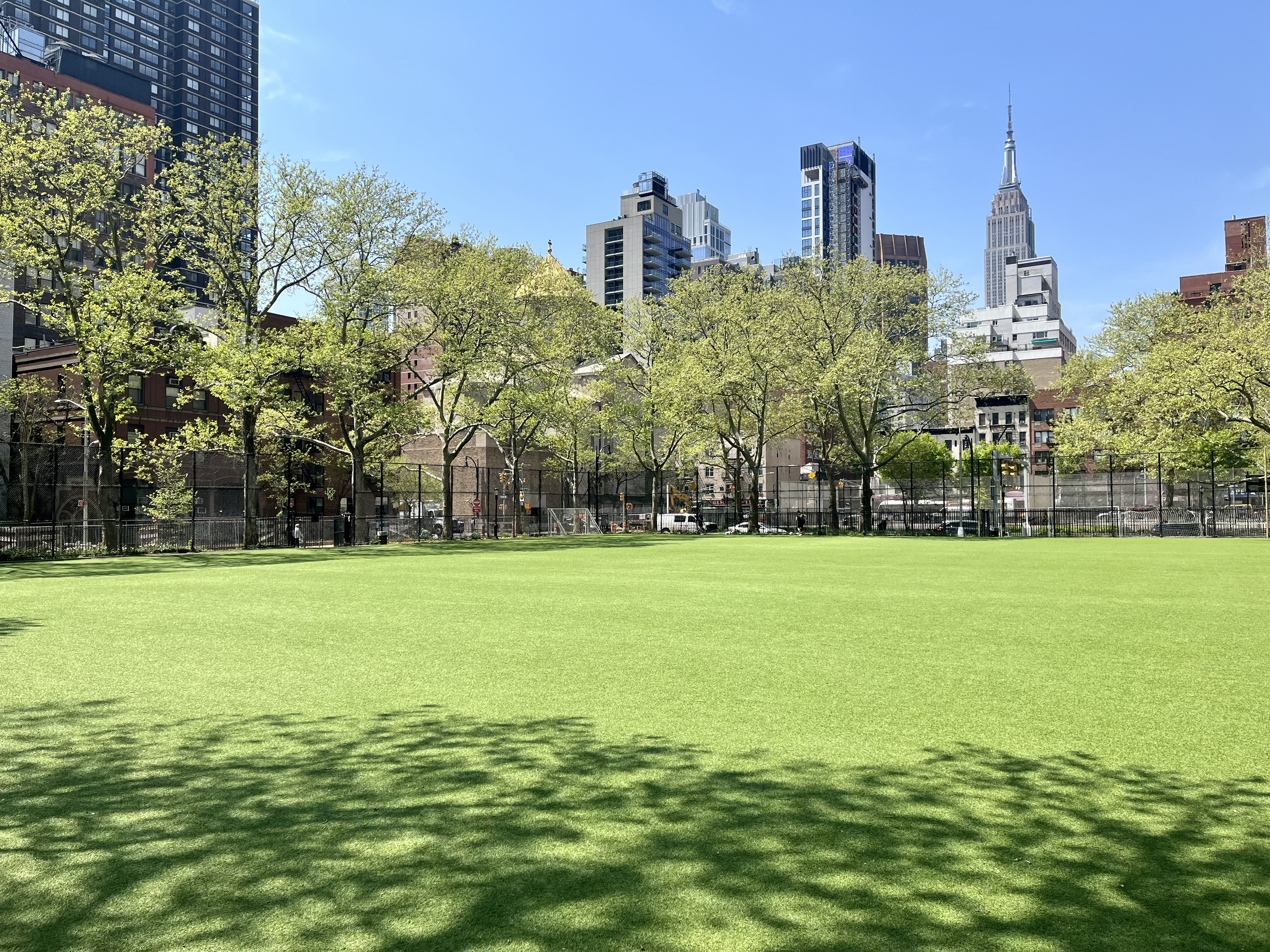
- St. Vartan Park in 2023
- Interactive map of St. Vartan Park
- Type: Urban park
- Location: Murray Hill, Manhattan, New York City
- Coordinates: 40°44′43″N 73°58′26″W
- Area: 2.76 acres (1.12 ha)
- Opened: October 4, 1906
- Operator: New York City Department of Parks and Recreation

St. Vartan Park is a 2.76-acre (1.12 ha) public park in the Murray Hill neighborhood of Manhattan, New York City. Originally called St. Gabriel's Park, it is located on the block bounded by First Avenue, Second Avenue, and 35th and 36th streets. In the late 1930s, construction of the Queens–Midtown Tunnel resulted in the removal of a portion of the park for an approach roadway and the demolition of St. Gabriel Church, the park's namesake. The park was renamed in 1978 after St. Vartan Armenian Cathedral, which had opened across the street from the park in 1968. St. Vartan Park includes basketball and handball courts, a turf athletic field, a playground, and a garden.

== History ==
=== Planning and construction ===
The decision to create a new public park on the block bounded by First and Second avenues and 35th and 36th streets came from a recommendation made by the Small Parks Commission, an advisory committee appointed by New York City Mayor William Lafayette Strong in 1897 with the purpose of creating additional small parks and playgrounds. The new park, which was originally 2.95 acres (1.19 ha) in size, displaced an entire city block previously occupied by tenements. A resolution authorizing a park on this site was adopted by the New York City Board of Public Improvements in June 1901. In October 1901, Mayor Van Wyck approved an ordinance passed by the New York City Municipal Assembly to lay out a public park on the block and authorized the commencement of condemnation proceedings for property acquisition. The land for the park was obtained by the city in 1903, and a total amount of $1,028,000 was awarded to property owners as compensation for the taking of their land.

The removal of tenements for the new park displaced 500 families and concerned leaders of Tammany Hall political organization, which considered the block to be a reliable source of votes for the Democratic party. This left only a single registered voter in the election district, who resided above the lumber yard he worked at opposite the site of the planned park.

The park was constructed from 1904 to 1905 and was originally named St. Gabriel's Park after the former St. Gabriel Church located at 310 East 37th Street, however, before the park was completed there were debates over its naming. Some of the local residents—including members of the St. Gabriel Church—felt that the park should instead be named "Civic Park" in recognition of the nearby Civic Club and the efforts of Captain F. Norton Goddard to locate the new park in the district. Although the name of the park had been designated as "Civic Park" by the Department of Parks Board of Commissioners in December 1903, a resolution to change the name to "St. Gabriel's Park" was passed by the New York City Board of Aldermen in March 1904 and ended the debate regarding the name.

In 1905, the Society of Beaux-Arts Architects called for the design of a yacht harbor and club in the final competition for its Second Paris Prize. This program was to be located on the site of the new park as well as additional properties extending north to 37th Street, south to 34th Street, and east to the East River. The design called for plans for a park along with a boat basin, clubhouse, garage, library, lighthouse, maritime museum, monument or fountain to John Paul Jones, and restaurant. Drawings from the competition were exhibited at the Art Students League; the winner was John Wynkoop, who received a $2,500 prize to attend the École des Beaux-Arts de Paris. An extension of the St. Gabriel's Park to include the block on the east side of First Avenue was later proposed by the Local Board of the Kip's Bay District, but the idea was rejected by the Board of Estimate and Apportionment in 1907.

=== Opening and early years ===
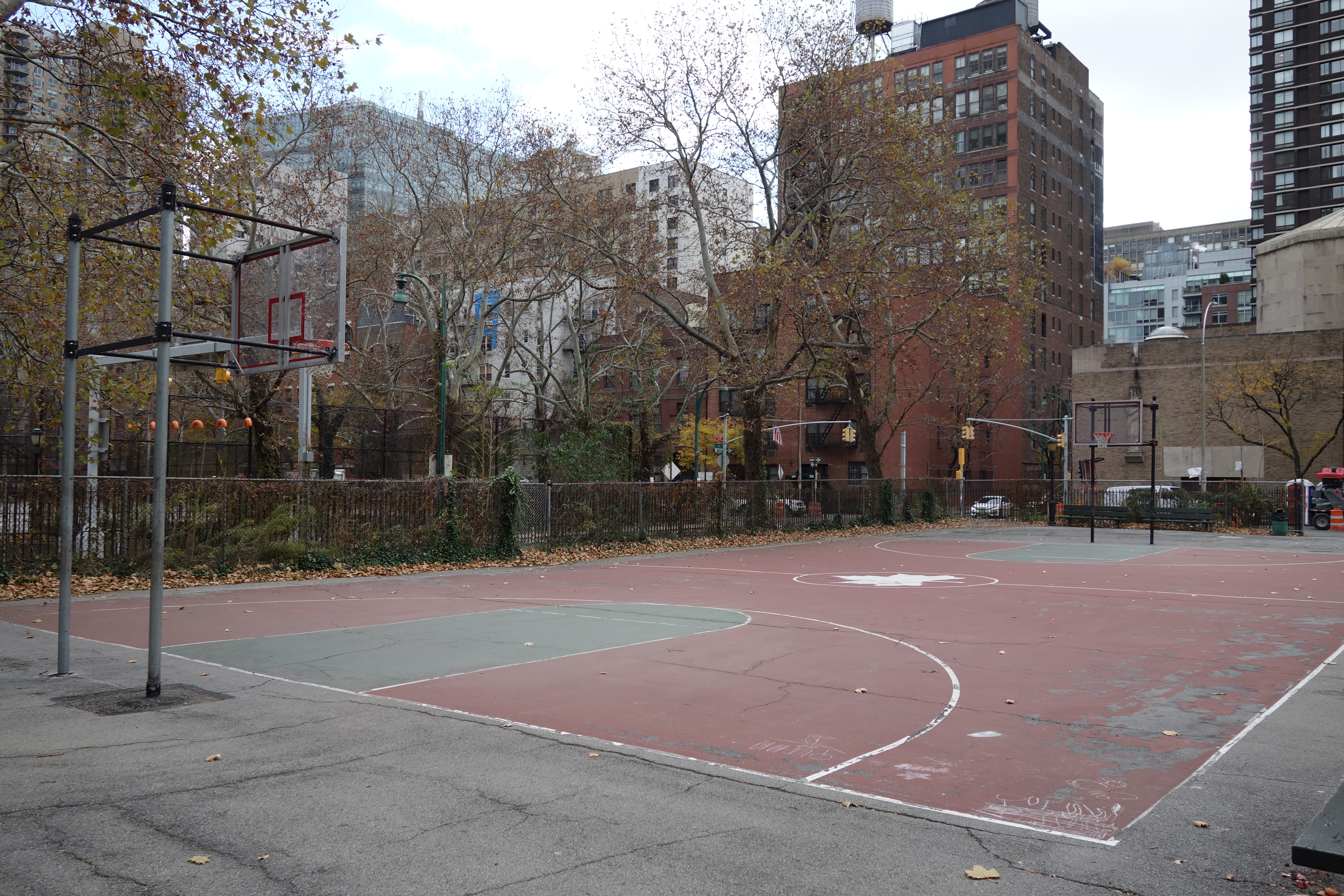
The basketball court in 2018

The park was originally laid out with a playground near its west end, a gymnasium containing a running track in the middle of the block, and a comfort station near the east end; landscaping bordered the park's perimeter. The grounds were equipped with playground fixtures and gymnasium apparatus in 1906 and the playground opened to the public on October 4, 1906. The girls' playground included the first playground slide installed by the New York Park Department.

In 1908, the St. Gabriel's Park Branch of the New York Public Library opened at 303–305 East 36th Street on the north side of the park. A Carnegie library designed by the architectural firm of McKim, Mead & White, the four-story building included a rooftop reading room that overlooked the park it was named after. (Note: The library was subsequently closed in 1940 to make way for construction of the Manhattan portal of the Queens–Midtown Tunnel.)

Renovations to St. Gabriel's Park were made in the mid-1930s, which included the addition of basketball, handball and shuffleboard courts, a roller skating track, and a softball diamond. Reconstruction of the western half of the park was completed in August 1936 and the remainder of the park reopened in February 1937.

A war memorial for the soldiers from Murray Hill who died in World War I was unveiled in October 1936. This memorial was donated by the local post of the American Legion and originally consisted of a flagpole, four bronze plaques and a grove of trees; the tablets have since been relocated from the base of the flagpole to the field house on the east side of the park.

=== Land reclamation ===
In 1938, a portion of the park was removed to make way for an approach roadway leading to the Queens–Midtown Tunnel, which was completed in 1940. Construction of the Manhattan portal of the tunnel also resulted in the elimination of St. Gabriel Church, the original namesake for the park.

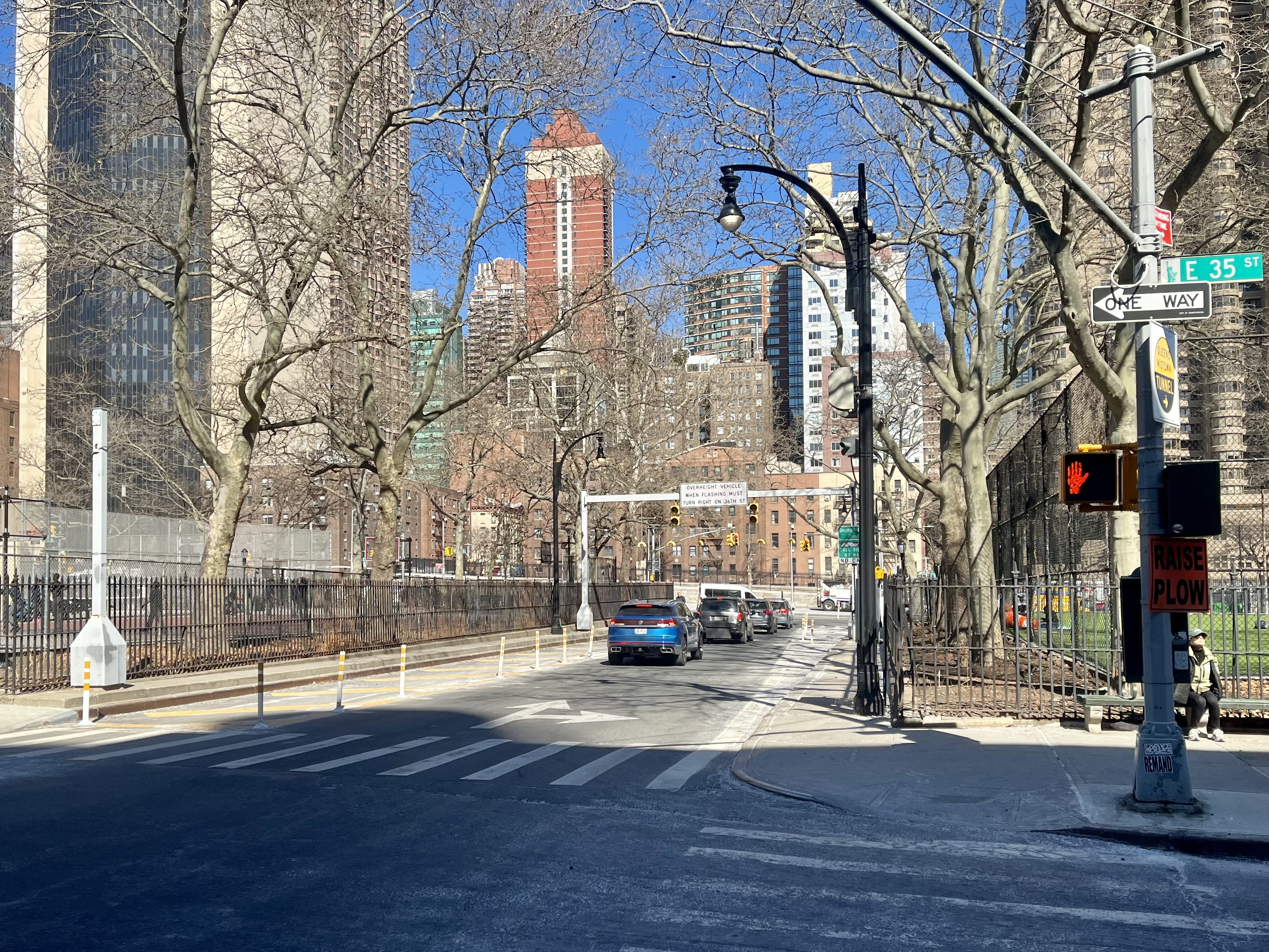
The segment of Tunnel Approach Street that runs through the park

During early planning stages, the location of the tunnel's entrance/exit plaza had been proposed between 36th and 38th streets from First to Second avenues, which was opposed by both the First Avenue Association and Manhattan Parks Commissioner Walter R. Herrick given its proximity to St. Gabriel's Park. The First Avenue Association recommended moving the plaza one block to the north to avoid the park, but acknowledged that this would increase the cost of condemning buildings, including the Eleto Company warehouse on East 38th Street. The tunnel's entrance/exit plaza was subsequently relocated to run from 36th to 37th streets between First and Third avenues and was designed to minimize acquisition costs and impacts to existing buildings while also providing accommodations to connect to a proposed crosstown vehicular tunnel to the Lincoln Tunnel.

When New York City Parks Commissioner Robert Moses learned of the Queens Midtown Tunnel Authority's plan to use part of St. Gabriel's Park for an approach to the tunnel, he criticized the authority for not informing him about the plan and also assuming they could obtain park land. Moses planned to fight the proposal to use the park, as the law only allowed the city to transfer property to the tunnel authority that "is not devoted to any other public use." The New York State Legislature soon passed a new bill that abolished the Queens Midtown Tunnel Authority and created the New York City Tunnel Authority in its place, eliminating the language that Moses felt protected the transfer of park land in the process.

The First Avenue Association called upon the tunnel authority to purchase new land for park purposes provided that any existing park space was used in building the tunnel. New parkland was later added in the vicinity of 42nd Street to offset the land taking in St. Gabriel's Park, which resulted in the creation of Robert Moses Playground adjacent to the tunnel's ventilation building. The western portion of St. Gabriel's Park was subsequently reconstructed to account for tunnel approach roadway with relocations of trees, benches, playground areas and utilities as well as the addition of new fencing and landscaping.

=== Late 20th century to present ===
In 1978, St. Gabriel's Park was renamed St. Vartan Park after the St. Vartan Armenian Cathedral that had opened across the street from the park in 1968. A motion to rename the park was unanimously approved by the New York City Council in April 1978 and was signed into law by Mayor Ed Koch the following month. A dedication ceremony to mark the renaming of the park was held on April 23, 1978. The cathedral had been sponsoring an annual One World Festival at the park, which began in 1973 and celebrated Armenian culture and the heritage of other ethnic communities found within New York City with food vendors as well as performances by dance and musical groups. The annual festival was jointly supported by the city for 16 years and continued until 1989 when the city ended its sponsorship due to financial issues. Another One World Festival was held in 1998 to mark the centennials of the Armenian Diocese of America and New York City.

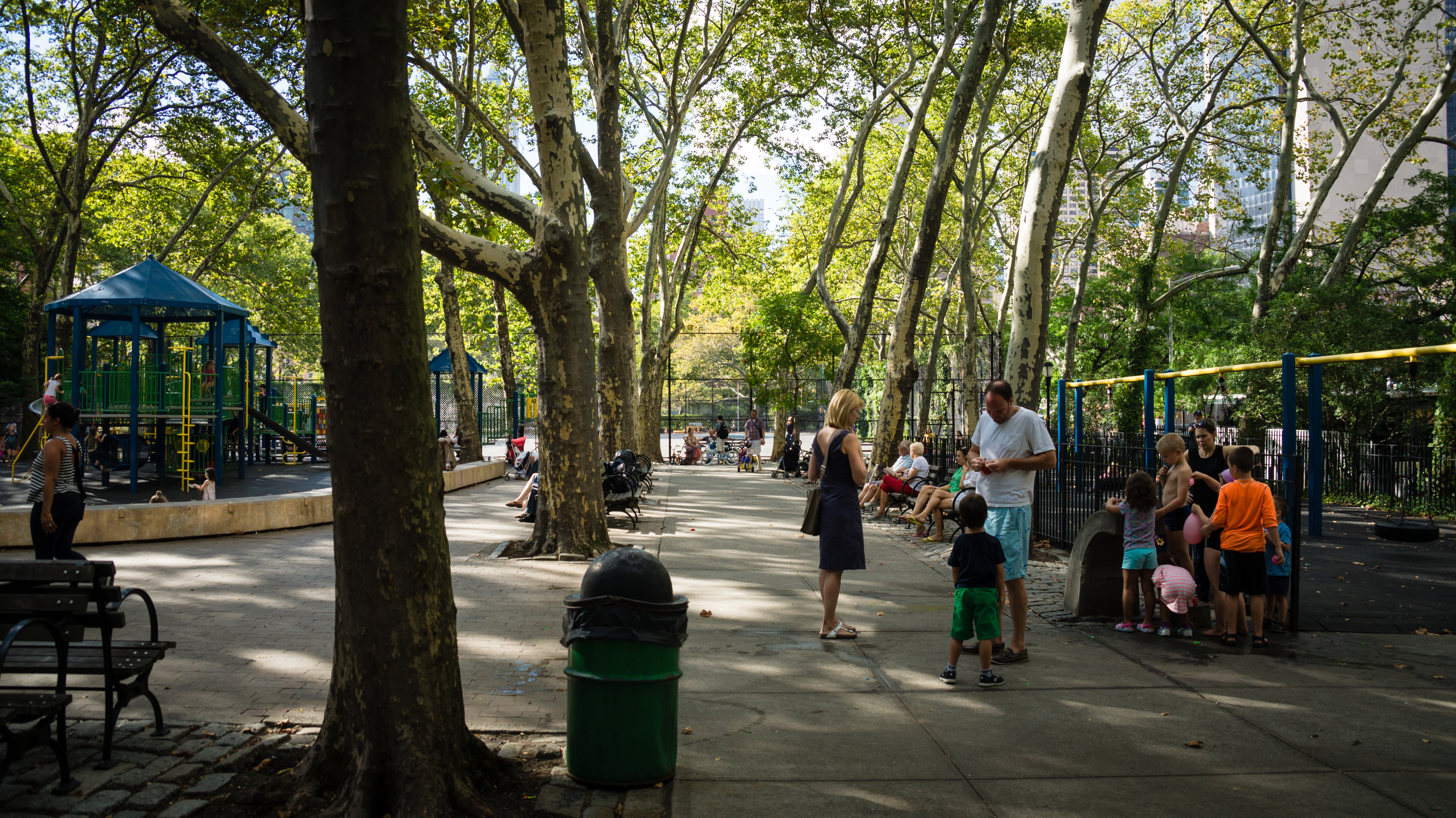
The playground in 2013

In 1982, as part of the development of the Manhattan Place apartment building on the east side of First Avenue between 36th and 37th streets, The Glick Organization agreed to renovate St. Vartan Park and contributed $900,000 in private funds to rehabilitate the playground and field house on the east side of the park. This renovation was completed in 1984 and also included the planting of new trees and over 9,200 shrubs. From 2001–2002, the playground underwent another reconstruction using a total of $582,000 of public funds contributed by Andrew S. Eristoff and Eva Moskowitz, the council members for the 4th district of the New York City Council.

In the early 2010s, a water supply shaft for New York City Water Tunnel No. 3 was constructed near the southwest corner of St. Vartan Park. Shaft 32B was drilled approximately 495 feet (151 m) down into bedrock to connect with a spur of Stage 2 of the water tunnel that begins at Shaft 26B on Tenth Avenue between 30th and 31st streets. Construction of the shaft required the temporary closure of approximately 1,460 square feet (136 m^{2}) of the park and construction of an interim entrance to the basketball court from Tunnel Approach Street. The completed shaft includes two hatchways and 10-foot-high (3.0 m) air vents in the sidewalk on 35th Street within the mapped parkland. The hatchways provide access to underground valve and distribution chambers, which are used to shut down the risers for maintenance and provide connections to water mains serving the surrounding area.

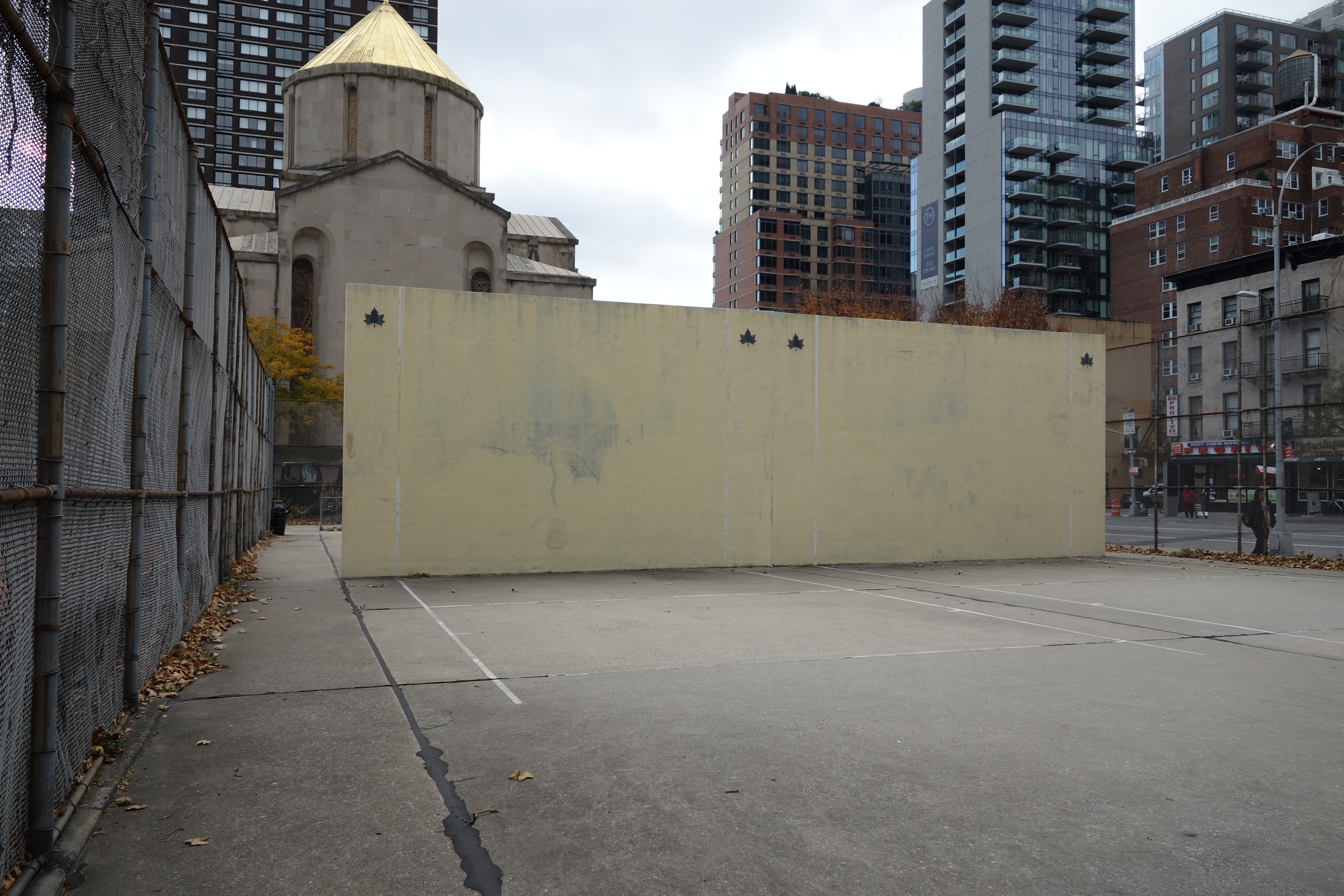
Handball courts with St. Vartan Armenian Cathedral in the background

The park's asphalt playground was replaced by a synthetic turf field in 2021 to improve existing parks due to the temporary loss of park space during construction of the city's East Side Coastal Resiliency project. Not all park users were happy with the addition of the turf field—especially given the growing popularity of pickleball that was occurring at the time—because the park's asphalt playing field was able to accommodate as many as 12 pickleball courts. As a comparison, the west end of the park adjacent to the wall used for handball and as a tennis backboard only had enough room to accommodate up to four pickleball courts. Despite the elimination of the asphalt playground, in 2022 St. Vartan Park had 800 members in a pickleball group on Slack and was considered one of Manhattan's top spots for pickleball, with its courts being used for games throughout much of the day on a daily basis. Annual pickleball tournaments have also been held at the park.

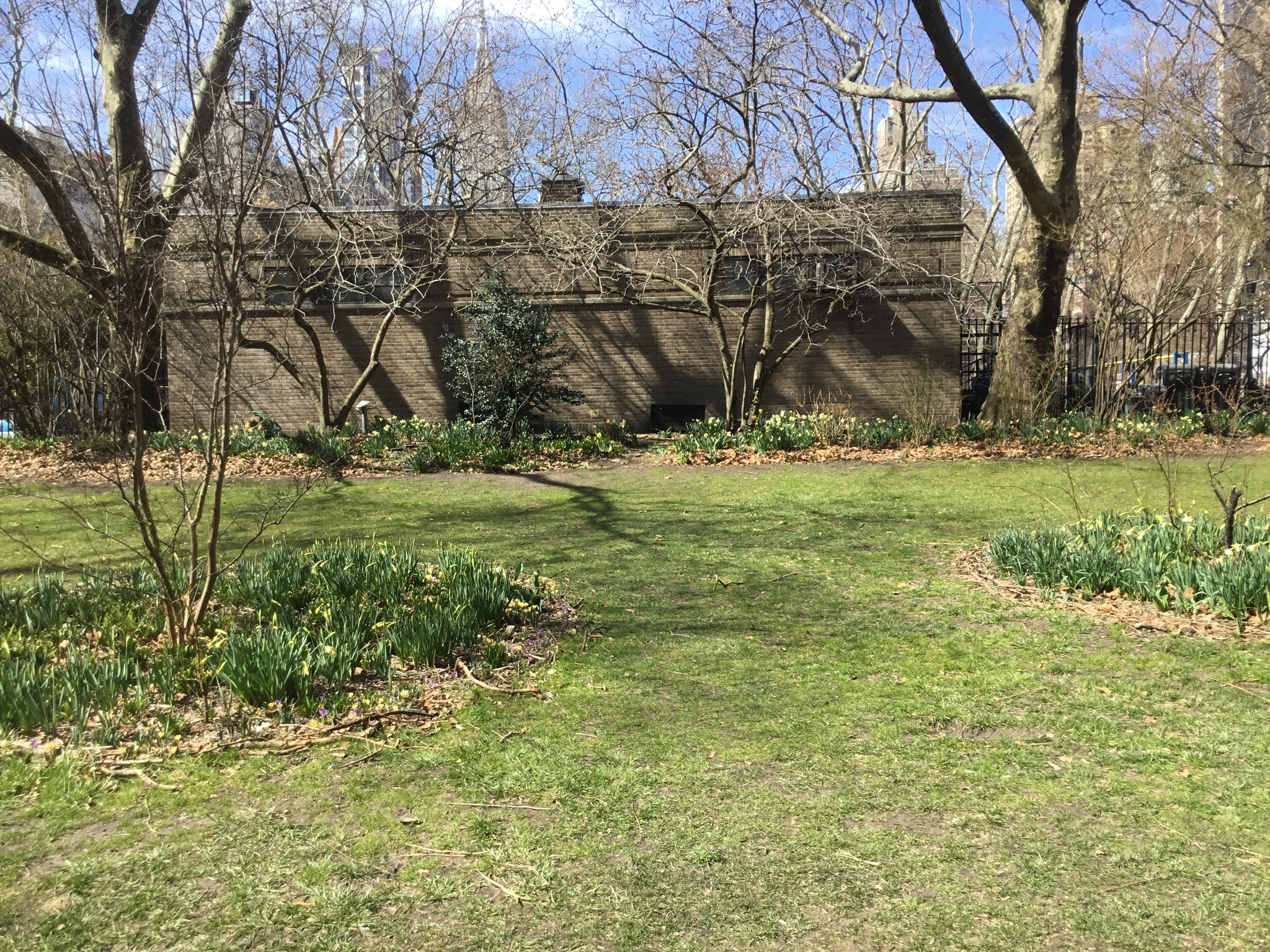
The garden and comfort station in 2023

In October 2021, the garden located on the east end of the park (adjacent to First Avenue) was opened to the public for a two-month-long trial. The gate to the garden had been locked since at least 2000 when the space started being used exclusively by the St. Vartan Preschool. After the conclusion of the trial period, the New York City Department of Parks and Recreation (NYC Parks) then agreed to keep the garden open to the public on a permanent basis the following spring. The site had been previously used as a vegetable garden during the Great Depression and World War II, but NYC Parks thought that the space had never been open to the public throughout the park's history. An ADA-compliant entrance and pathway was later added to the garden in 2024. The improvements to visitor access were funded by the Soloviev Foundation through NYC Parks' Adopt-A-Park program. (Note: The Soloviev Foundation is the philanthropic arm of the Soloviev Group, the developer of the vacant parcel of land on First Avenue between 38th and 41st streets (the former location of the Waterside Generating Station), which was seeking to open a casino on the site.)

In April 2022, the St. Vartan Park Conservancy was formed as a not-for-profit organization. A public event to welcome the conservancy and to celebrate the opening of the St. Vartan Park garden to the general public after years of closure was held in the garden on May 9, 2022. Remarks were delivered at the event by elected officials, St. Vartan Park Conservancy officers and others including from NYC Parks and a local public elementary school.

In 2025, funding for additional improvements to St. Vartan Park was included as part of the city's Midtown South rezoning project, which will upgrade lighting to allow the park's facilities to stay open later for the community. As of 2026, NYC Parks only had four fields in Manhattan with lighting.

== In media ==
- St. Gabriel's Park is represented in the artwork of Jerome Myers (1867–1940).
- Adam Pascal and the Broadway company of the musical Memphis filmed a music video on the asphalt playground at St. Vartan Park, which was shown on CBS' coverage of the 2011 Macy's Thanksgiving Day Parade.
- St. Vartan Park is depicted as the location where Root is posing as a nanny and meets with Finch in the Honor Among Thieves episode in the fourth season of the TV series Person of Interest (originally aired on November 11, 2014).
- In the final episode of the second season of the TV series Manifest (originally aired on April 6, 2020), the St. Vartan Park playground is the location of the scene where Saanvi kills the Major.
