= Thomas Balsley =

American landscape architect

- Born: 1943 (age 82–83)
- Education: SUNY ESF
- Occupation: Landscape architect
- Awards: ASLA Design Medal (2015)
- Practice: Thomas Balsley Associates

Thomas Balsley (born 1943), FASLA, is the founder and principal designer of Thomas Balsley Associates, a New York City-based design firm best known for its fusion of landscape and urbanism in public parks and plazas. Balsley's firm has been active for over 35 years.

== Life and career ==
Thomas Balsley was born in 1943 and studied at Syracuse University and then the SUNY College of Environmental Science and Forestry. He moved to New York City in 1970, and within a year founded his own firm, Thomas Balsley Associates. In New York City alone, Mr. Balsley has completed more than 100 parks and plazas, most notably Riverside Park South and Gantry Plaza State Park. In addition, to his above ground work, NYC MTA selected his bench design for its transit systems. In a gesture of recognition for his contribution to New York City's public spaces, Balsley Park, formerly known as Sheffield Plaza, on 9th Avenue between 56th and 57th Streets in New York City, has been renamed in honor of the landscape designer.

About Gantry Plaza State Park, former architecture critic of The New York Times Herbert Muschamp wrote, “The evil spell is broken... The curse that reduced New York’s landscape architects to creating Disney versions of Central Park has been at least temporarily lifted.”

Balsley's work can be seen in the United States in the downtown and waterfront parks of major cities like Dallas, Los Angeles, Portland, Detroit, Cleveland, Tampa, and Baltimore's Inner Harbor. Recently-won international design competitions include the Magok Waterfront and the National Ecological Center in Korea and Kasumigaseki Plaza in Tokyo. He has given lectures at the Harvard Graduate School of Design, the University of Pennsylvania, the National Building Museum and Seoul National University. In addition he has received international recognition in the form of awards and citations from professional and civic organizations, including the American Society of Landscape Architects, the Cooper-Hewitt National Design Museum, the American Institute of Architects, Environmental Design Research Association, the Institute for Urban Design and the Waterfront Center.

== Projects ==
- Riverside Park South, New York, New York.
- Hunter's Point South Waterfront Park, Queens, New York.
- Gantry Plaza State Park, Long Island City, New York.
- SUNY Albany Masterplan (Phase 1 completed), Albany, New York.
- Library Green, New Rochelle, New York.
- West Shore Park, Baltimore, Maryland.
- Curtis Hixon Park, Tampa, Florida.
- Skyline Park, Denver, Colorado.
- Gate City, Osaki, Tokyo, Japan
- Kasumigaseki Plaza, Tokyo, Japan
- Main Street Garden Park, Dallas, Texas
- Pacific Design Center, Dallas, Texas
- Beaumont Quarter, Auckland, New Zealand
