= Church of the Sacred Hearts of Jesus and Mary (Manhattan) =

Demolished church in Manhattan, New York

Coordinates: 40.74405°N 73.97558°W

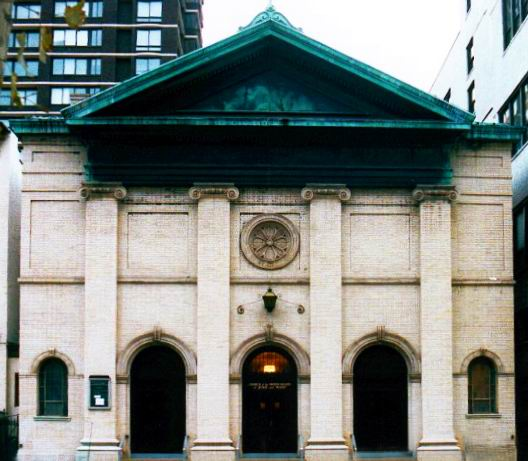
- Facade of the former church
- Church of the Sacred Hearts of Jesus and Mary
- Location: 309-315 East 33rd Street, Manhattan, New York,
- Country: United States
- Denomination: Roman Catholic

History
- Status: Demolished
- Founded: 1914
- Founder: Right Rev. Msgr. Joseph Congedo
- Dedication: Sacred Hearts of Jesus and Mary
- Dedicated: October 1, 1916

Architecture
- Architect: Nicholas Serracino
- Style: Greek Revival
- Years built: 1915
- Groundbreaking: October 3, 1915
- Completed: December 1915
- Construction cost: $35,000
- Closed: January 2007
- Demolished: 2007-2008

Specifications
- Capacity: 700

Administration
- Archdiocese: New York

Chapel of the Sacred Hearts of Jesus and Mary
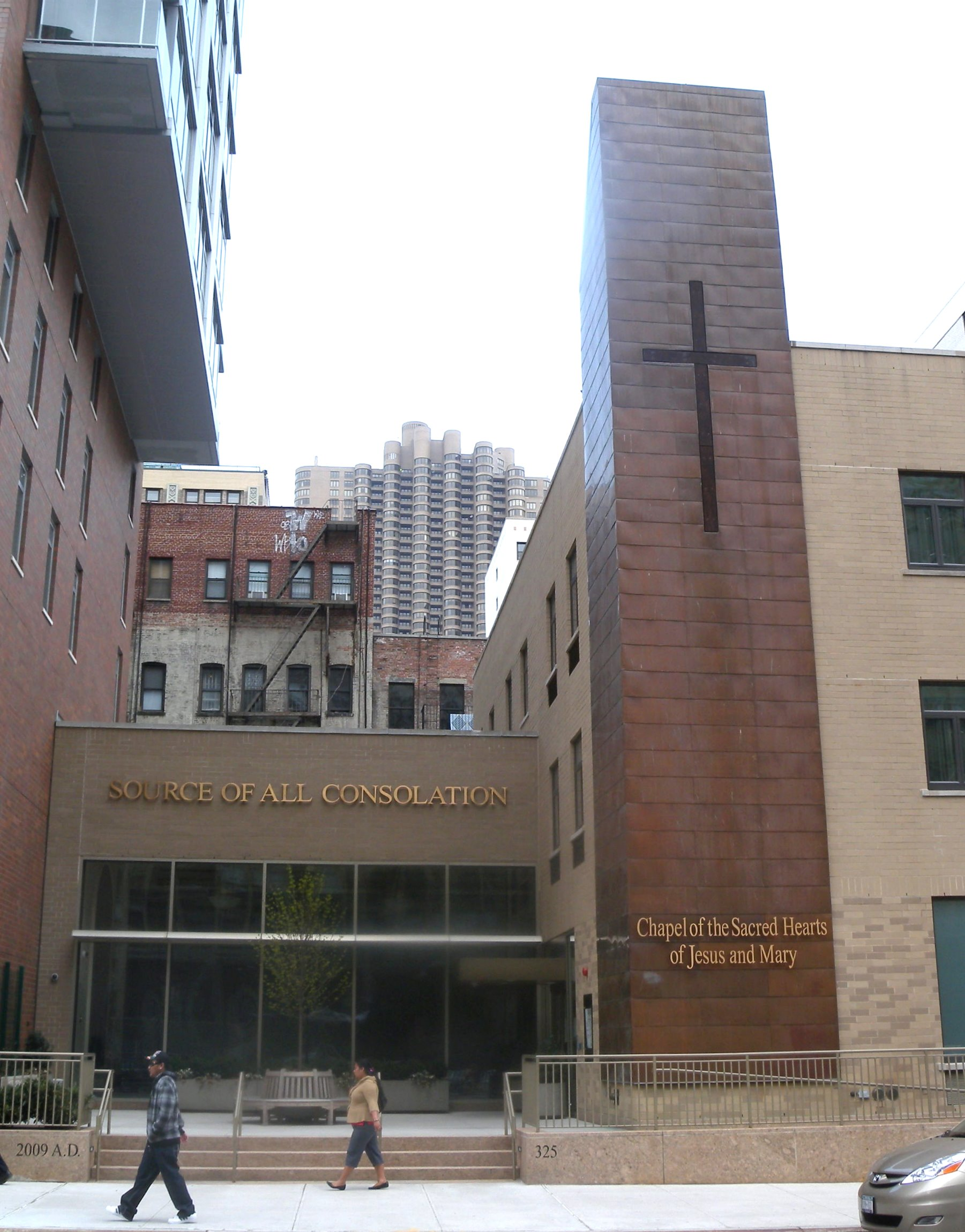
- Sacred Hearts Chapel (2011)
- Chapel of the Sacred Hearts of Jesus and Mary
- Location: 325 East 33rd Street, Manhattan, New York,
- Country: United States
- Denomination: Roman Catholic

History
- Status: Active
- Founded: 2007
- Founder: Cardinal Edward Egan
- Dedication: Sacred Hearts of Jesus and Mary
- Dedicated: May 2010

Architecture
- Functional status: Mission church
- Architectural type: Chapel
- Years built: 2008-2009
- Completed: 2009

Specifications
- Capacity: 150

Administration
- Parish: Our Saviour

The Church of the Sacred Hearts of Jesus and Mary was a former Roman Catholic parish church, primarily serving Italian-Americans, that has been demolished. The church was located on 309-315 East 33rd Street, in the Kips Bay area of Manhattan, New York City. It has since been replaced by a chapel under the same name.

== History ==
=== Parish church ===
The parish was established in 1914, to serve an estimated population of 10,000 Italian Americans living in the area. The first rector was Joseph M. Congedo, an Italian-born priest that came to the United States in 1905 before he was ordained as a priest at the St. Joseph's Seminary in 1907. Congedo was first assigned to St. Philip Neri's Church in the Bronx and was transferred in 1913 to St. Gabriel Church on East 37th Street in Manhattan to establish a new church in the area. Services for the new parish were initially held in the basement of St. Gabriel's.

A plot of land at 309-315 East 33rd Street with a frontage of 64 feet (20 m) and a depth of 98.9 feet (30.1 m) was acquired for the new church in May 1915 and demolition of the four dwellings that had occupied the site began in the following month. In June 1915, architect Nicholas Serracino completed preliminary plans for a stone and brick church with an estimated cost of $35,000. The adjacent lot at 317 East 33rd Street was also acquired in the same month, which would serve as the church's first rectory.

The cornerstone for the church was laid on October 3, 1915, by Cardinal John M. Farley, the Archbishop of New York; the event was attended by more than five thousand Italian Catholics. The structure was completed in December 1915 and the first mass was held in the new church on January 30, 1916. The church was dedicated on October 1, 1916, by Archbishop Giovanni Bonzano, P.I.M.E., Apostolic Delegate to the United States at the time. There were a few little changes later with the replacement of the original oak doors with cruciform windows with black metal doors with square windows.

In 1939 St. Gabriel Church was closed to make way for the Queens–Midtown Tunnel and part of the congregation was directed to Sacred Hearts.

A four-story school building designed by architect Matthew Del Gaudio was constructed at 317-323 East 33rd Street in 1925. The parish operated the School of the Sacred Hearts, which remained open through at least the 1965–66 school year when it was being attended by 176 students in first through eighth grades. The parish also operated Immaculata High School, which was run by the Sisters, Servants of the Immaculate Heart of Mary. The high school was closed in June 1989. After the closure of Immaculata High School, the building served as the temporary home of St. Agnes Boys High School from 1989 to 1992 and later housed The Child Grade School and Legacy High School until 2003.

The parish was closed in January 2007, one of several closed that year by the then-archbishop, Cardinal Edward Egan. It was then merged with the Church of Our Lady of the Scapular–St. Stephen and the church and school were demolished. In November 2014, it was announced by the archdiocese that the existing parish was to be merged into Our Saviour Parish as of the following year.

The former sites of the church, school and rectory were sold to a private developer, who erected a 12-story condominium building in 2009.

=== Chapel ===
After the demolition of the parish church, a small chapel and residence for the clergy, also dedicated to the Sacred Hearts of Jesus and Mary, was built on the former site of the parish convent, 325 East 33rd Street, with "A.D. 2009" prominently carved into the cornerstone of the building. The first Mass was celebrated on May 18, 2009. It served as the residence of the same Cardinal Egan who ordered the closing of the parish, after his retirement as archbishop, until his death in 2015. He himself dedicated the chapel in May 2010. The organ in the chapel is from St. Stephen's; it was refurbished in 2012. "The Chapel serves a home for the Immaculata High School Alumni as well as a meditation place for the local medical facilities of NYU Langone Health, Bellevue Hospital, the Office of Chief Medical Examiner, and the VA Hospital."

In May 2015, the segment of East 33rd Street adjacent to the chapel was co-named "Father Damien Way" in honor of Father Damien, a Roman Catholic priest from Belgium who dedicated his life to helping people with leprosy (Hansen's disease) that were forced to live in exile on the Hawaiian island of Molokai. A ceremony celebrating the co-naming of the street was attended by Cardinal Timothy M. Dolan and Minister-President of Flanders Geert Bourgeois. A prayer service was held at the chapel following the ceremony, which was led by Cardinal Dolan and attended by Bernardito Auza, the Apostolic Nuncio to the United Nations. The chapel shares the name of Father Damien's religious order—the Congregation of the Sacred Hearts of Jesus and Mary—and is also located near the New York Regional Hansen's Disease Center at Bellevue Hospital, which at the time was the location of the only treatment center for Hansen's disease in the New York City area.

== Clergy ==
These include

Former pastors:

- Right Rev. Msgr. Joseph Congedo (1914–1954)
- Rev. John McEvoy (1954–1962)
- Right Rev. Msgr. Thomas A. Dunn (1962–1971)
- Rev. Msgr. William Rinschler (1971–1985)
- Rev. Msgr. Albert DeLuca (1985–2006)
- Rev. Msgr. Donald Sakano (2006–2007)
- Rev. Msgr. Lawrence Connaughton (2007–2009)

Administrators of the chapel:

- Rev. Msgr. Lawrence Connaughton (2009–2012)
- Rev. Robert J. Robbins (2012–2021)
- Msgr. Kevin Sullivan
