= Our Saviour Roman Catholic Church (Manhattan) =

Church in Manhattan, New York

Coordinates: 40°44′57.21″N 73°58′45.33″W

Church of Our Saviour
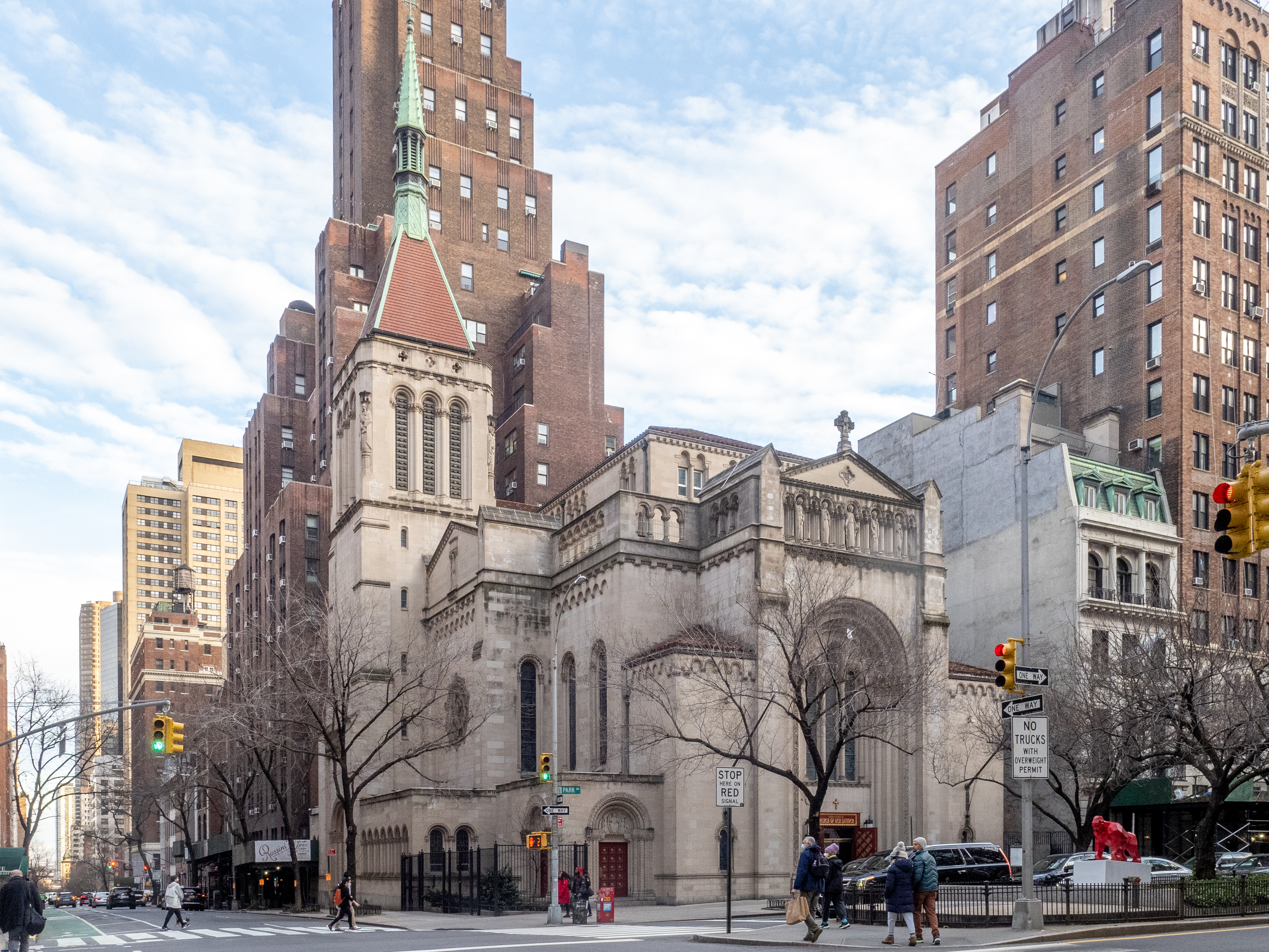
- Interactive map of the Church of Our Saviour area

General information
- Architectural style: Romanesque
- Location: New York, New York, United States of America
- Groundbreaking: April 1, 1956
- Completed: September 27, 1959
- Cost: $4,400,000
- Client: Roman Catholic Archdiocese of New York

Design and construction
- Architect: Paul C. Reilly
- Main contractor: Vermilya-Brown Construction Company

Website
- Our Savior Catholic Church, Manhattan

Church of Our Saviour is a Roman Catholic parish church in the Roman Catholic Archdiocese of New York, located at 59 Park Avenue and 38th Street in Manhattan, New York City. The parish was established in 1955. In 2015, the parish was renamed Our Saviour and St. Stephen/Our Lady of the Scapular after it merged with the parish of St. Stephen/Our Lady of the Scapular. The parish includes a mission church, the Chapel of the Sacred Hearts of Jesus and Mary at 325 East 33rd Street, which had previously merged with St. Stephen/Our Lady of the Scapular.

== History ==
The land for the church was acquired in April 1953 at a cost of $700,000 for a new building to replace St. Gabriel Church, which had been demolished in 1939 to make way for the approach to the Queens–Midtown Tunnel. A new parish was being planned to ease overcrowding at the neighboring parishes of St. Agnes and Sacred Hearts of Jesus and Mary as well as to provide more facilities for Catholics living and working in Murray Hill, an area which at the time had recently seen a considerable amount of new construction with more office and residential development expected to occur in the future. The site, which has frontages of 99 feet (30 m) along Park Avenue and 120 feet (37 m) along 38th Street, formerly consisted of five lots and contained four and five story dwellings.

In 1955, the new parish was established and preliminary plans were approved to construct the church. The parish originally covered the area stretching from the north side of 34th Street to the south side of 40th Street between the east side of Fifth Avenue and the west side of Third Avenue. Msgr. Thomas J. McMahon was appointed as the parish's first pastor by Cardinal Spellman on September 30, 1955. While the new church was under construction, services for the parish were held in the Allerton Room of the Midston House located at Madison Avenue and 38th Street; the first mass was celebrated on December 18, 1955. By February of the following year, masses began being held in the Provisional Chapel of Our Saviour, which was located in a rented townhouse at 72 Park Avenue. The clergy resided adjacent to the provisional chapel at the 70 Park Avenue Hotel. In the 1960s, the townhouse that had been used for the provisional chapel was combined and connected to form a new wing in the hotel, which was renamed the Doral Park Avenue.

A groundbreaking ceremony for the new church was held on April 1, 1956 (Easter Sunday), which was led by Joseph Patrick Donahue, Auxiliary Bishop of New York. At that time, over 1,000 parishioners were attending the masses being held at the provisional chapel. Contracts for construction of the new church were signed in November 1956. Following the death of Msgr. McMahon on December 6, 1956, Msgr. John M. Fleming was appointed as pastor of the parish in January 1957. The cornerstone for the church was laid and dedicated by Cardinal Spellman on June 27, 1957. Construction of the church was phased to allow for the first services to be held in the lower level while the rest of the building was being completed, with the floor slabs for the main level serving as a temporary roof. The first mass held at the new church was the midnight mass on December 24, 1957. The first mass held on the main level took place on February 11, 1959 (Ash Wednesday). The completed church was dedicated by Cardinal Spellman on September 27, 1959.

In 2015 the parish of St. Stephen/Our Lady of the Scapular merged with the parish of Our Saviour. This included the Chapel of the Sacred Hearts of Jesus and Mary, which had previously merged with St. Stephen/Our Lady of the Scapular.

== Building ==
The church was designed by Paul C. Reilly, who was also known for his design of Manhattan theaters. It was the first church built in New York City that was designed to accommodate air conditioning; the cooling equipment is hidden in the tower. The main floor of the church has a seating capacity of 562 while the lower level functions as a sanctuary or social hall with a capacity of 600. A two-story rectory is located above the church and parish offices are located on the ground floor on the north side of the building along 38th Street.

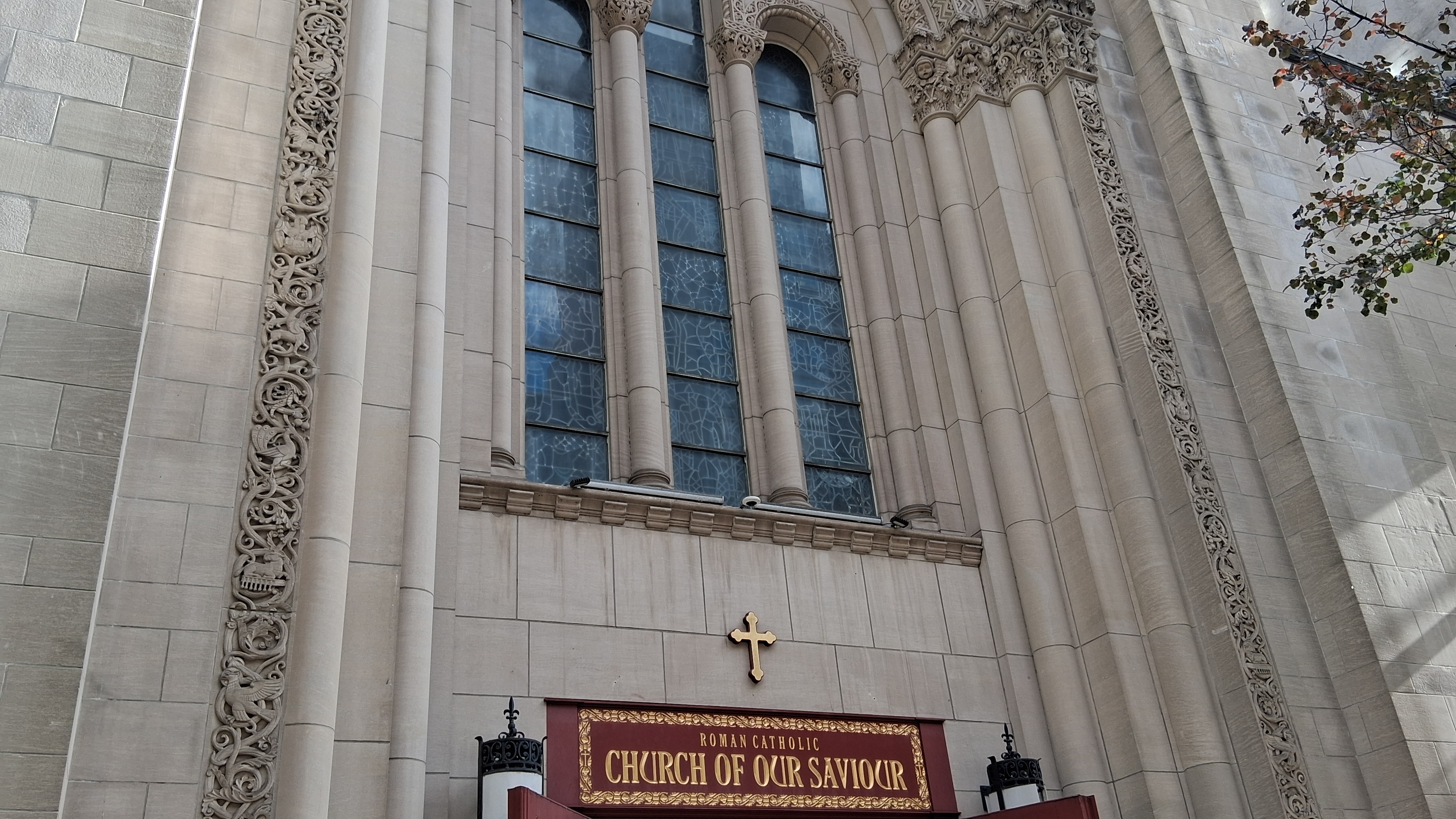
Stone carvings located above the main entrance to the church

One challenge faced during the construction was obtaining stone carvers to perform $755,000 worth of stonework on the church's limestone exterior, as at that time half of New York's stone carvers were working on the Cathedral of Mary Our Queen in Baltimore and the Basilica of the National Shrine of the Immaculate Conception in Washington, D.C. A 71-year-old stone carver was convinced to come out of retirement to work on pointing and carving for Our Saviour and the stone carvers' union made a concession to allow the use of air hammers instead of hand tools, which enabled the work to be completed four to five times faster. Pillars fabricated from Languedoc marble are located on each side of the sanctuary. Each column is 17 feet (5.2 m) high and 2 feet 3 inches (0.69 m) in diameter; after the marble was quarried in southern France it was sent to Italy to be turned because the New York area didn't have a lathe large enough to accommodate the finishing work.

The church of St. Stephen the Martyr contained a series of paintings depicting the Stations of the Cross executed by Constantino Brumidi, beginning in 1868. Brumidi's Stations have been restored and the frames regilded. In March 2016 they were installed in Our Saviour, the parish church of the new merged parish of Our Saviour, St. Stephen and Our Lady of the Scapular, and the Chapel of the Sacred Hearts of Jesus and Mary.

== Controversy ==
In 2001, Father George Rutler was appointed pastor of the Parish of Our Savior. He reintroduced the traditional liturgies of the Latin Rite and commissioned a church renovation which included icons by artist Ken Woo. In 2013, a new pastor replaced Rutler, Father Robert Robbins, removed the artwork, causing complaints to be aired from both the Catholic and artistic communities. Robbins also discontinued the traditional rites.
