= St. Jean Baptiste Roman Catholic Church =

Historic church in Manhattan, New York

- North profile and west elevation (2026)

Religion
- Affiliation: Catholic Church (Latin Church)
- District: Archdiocese of New York
- Leadership: The Rev. John Thomas Lane, S.S.S.
- Year consecrated: 1912

Location
- Location: 1067–1071 Lexington Avenue (184 East 76th Street); Manhattan, New York City
- Interactive map of St. Jean Baptiste; Roman Catholic Church

Architecture
- Architect: Nicholas Serracino
- Style: Italian Renaissance Revival, Classical Revival, Italian Mannerism
- Groundbreaking: 1910
- Completed: 1913
- Construction cost: $600,000

Specifications
- Direction of façade: west
- Capacity: 1,200
- Dome: 1
- Dome height (outer): 175 feet (53 m)
- Spire: 2
- Spire height: 150 feet (46 m)
- Materials: Limestone

Website
- The Church of St. Jean Baptiste, New York City
- St. Jean Baptiste; Roman Catholic Church
- U.S. National Register of Historic Places
- New York State Register of Historic Places
- New York City Landmark
- Location within Manhattan Location within New York City Location within New York Location within the United States
- Coordinates: 40°46′21″N 73°57′36″W
- NRHP reference No.: 80002720
- NYSRHP No.: 06101.001771
- NYCL No.: 0420

Significant dates
- Added to NRHP: April 23, 1980
- Designated NYSRHP: June 23, 1980
- Designated NYCL: November 19, 1969

St. Jean Baptiste Roman Catholic Church, also known as the Église St-Jean-Baptiste, is a Catholic parish church in the Archdiocese of New York at the corner of Lexington Avenue and East 76th Street in the Lenox Hill neighborhood of the Upper East Side of Manhattan, New York City. The parish was established in 1882 to serve the area's French Canadian immigrant population and remained the French-Canadian National Parish until 1957. It has been staffed by the Fathers of the Blessed Sacrament since 1900.

Financier Thomas Fortune Ryan, a Catholic convert in his teens, bankrolled its construction. It was designed by Nicholas Serracino, an Italian architect practicing in New York, who, inspired by the Italian Mannerists, combined elements of the Italian Renaissance Revival and Classical Revival architectural styles, Seracino won first prize for the design at the Esposizione Internazionale delle Industrie e del Lavoro in Turin, Italy in 1911. It is his only surviving church in the city.

The church is one of the few Catholic churches in New York City with a dome, and only one of two – the other being St. Patrick's Cathedral – with stained glass windows from the glass studios of Chartres. The building was designated a city landmark in 1969, and was listed on the National Register of Historic Places in 1980 along with its rectory. From 1995 to 1996 the interior and exterior were both restored and renovated.

Started in 1882 in a rented hall above a stable, the congregation has been through three buildings at two locations. St. Jean Baptiste High School was started on the grounds as an elementary school by nuns of the Congregation of Notre Dame in 1886. In the late 19th century, an exposure by a visiting priest of a relic of St. Anne, intended for one night, grew into a three-week event during which many miracle cures were alleged by thousands of pilgrims who crowded the church; as a result, the church now has its own shrine to the saint, which led to a failed effort to get it designated a basilica. In 1900 it passed from the control of the founding Fathers of Mercy to the Congregation of the Blessed Sacrament, who introduced Eucharistic adoration as a worship style.

== Architecture ==
The church is located on the east side of Lexington Avenue at 76th Street. The building takes up most of the 20,000-square-foot (1,900 m^{2}) lot, with the rectory on the south side, facing East 75th Street. The area is densely developed. St. Jean Baptiste High School, run by the church, is on the other side of 75th Street. Lenox Hill Hospital is nearby.

=== Main building ===
==== Exterior ====
The building, which opened in the spring of 1913, is faced in limestone. Its west (front) facade is rich in ornament. The main entrance is located in a pedimented portico with full entablature on a high plinth supported by four Corinthian columns. This design is echoed with smaller pediments on each of the side entrances above carved festoon and scroll motifs.

Above a broad cornice, twin bell towers rise to a total height of 150 feet (46 m) at the corners. Their lower stages with canted corners have round-arched openings framed by pilasters. Above them an open circle of Corinthian columns supports a ribbed dome, topped by a smaller version of the top with a cross. These are echoes of the larger dome in the middle of the church that rises to 172 feet (52 m). Between the two towers, on the parapet, a statue of angels supporting a globe echoes the pediment below. The gabled, gently pitched roofs are sheathed in copper.

On either side of the front facade, projecting entrance bays with windows are topped with a statue of an angel blowing a trumpet. The side elevations, of which only the north is visible from the street, have high round-arched windows and continue the cornice at the roofline. Pediments similar to those on the front grace the second story above the windows on either end of the transept.

==== Interior ====
Inside, the barrel-vaulted nave is separated from the vaulted aisles by an arcade of tall Corinthian columns; the vault springs from the entablature. All the vaults, ribs and arches are richly decorated with Florentine-style reliefs. The column capitals and fluting are also gilded. The center of the nave vault has trompe-l'œil paintings of the heavens; an elaborate Florentine-style floral pattern decorates the interior of the dome.

Against the apse triforium on the east wall of the church stands the high altar with a mosaic half-dome, statues, and smaller bas-relief sculptures. A shrine devoted to St. Anne, mother of Mary, is located here. A six-foot-tall statue depicting her and a young Mary resides in the shrine. A relic of Saint Anne, a piece of the bone of her arm, was brought to New York by Monsignor Marquis from Saint Anne d'Apt in France in May 1885 and placed in an antique reliquary on the right side of the shrine which was newly gilded at the time of the renovation of the shrine. The gold dolphin supporting the relic of Saint Anne was crafted in 1997 by Armand Guior. There are many stories of miraculous healings associated with believers who come to worship St. Anne in the presence of her relics. The theme of the stained glass window in the shrine is the Old Testament. The Paschal Lamb is on the left and the Ark of the Covenant is on the right of the shrine.. To the left is an altar to Mary of Carrara marble; to the right is a similar one honoring St. Joseph. At the transept corners are smaller altars to Congregation of the Blessed Sacrament founder St. Peter Julian Eymard, with a relic in a case below; the other corner's altar is to St. Anthony of Padua. The walls and ceilings are otherwise decorated with paintings in the Baroque style.

The stained glass windows and high altar were brought to New York from Chartres, France and Italy, respectively, following World War I. On three levels, from the dome to the nave, the windows portray the Twelve Apostles, scenes from the Old Testament which prefigure the Christian sacrament of the Eucharist, and events in the life and ministry of Jesus, including the Last Supper and the institution of the Eucharist and the Easter appearance of Christ to the disciples at Emmaus. The high altar is 50 feet (15 m) tall. A team of artisans accompanied the various pieces of the altar from Italy and reassembled it in the sanctuary.

Under the dome is the altar table, made of white marble. At the center of the frontal is a Christogram, IHS, from the first three letters of Jesus (ΙΗΣΟΥΣ) in Greek. The pews, choir stalls, and confessionals are of oak and are elaborately carved. Eucharistic images, especially wheat shocks and clusters of grapes, are prominent throughout the building.

=== Associated structures ===
The Rev. A. Letellier, rector, had a five-story brick and stone rectory at 170–190 East 76th Street and 1067 Lexington Avenue built in 1911 to designs by Nicholas Serracino of 1170 Broadway for $80,000. The rectory is also an Italian Renaissance-style palazzo. Five stories high, it is faced in white brick with granite steps leading down to 76th Street. The seven-bay north (front) facade features limestone voussoirs crowning each window. The end bays project slightly and are set off with large pilasters. The ground floor is rusticated. Limestone string courses are above the second and fourth stories, with a plain entablature and overhanging cornice at the roofline. There have been few alterations to the exterior. The interior, by contrast, has been extensively remodeled over time. Only the oak woodwork remains from the original building.

The Most Rev. Pat. J. Hayes had a four-story brick school with a tile roof at 163–173 East 75th built in 1925 to designs by Robert J. Reiley of 50 East 41st Street for $300,000. A five-story brick brothers apartment building at 194 East 76th Street, was built in 1930 to designs by Robert J. Reiley of 50 East 41st Street for $70,000 to 90,000. A five-story brick sisters apartment house at 163–175 East 75th Street and 170–198 East 76th Street and 1061–1071 Lexington Avenue was built in 1931 to designs by Robert J. Reiley of 50 East 41st Street for $125,000.

== History ==
From its origins in a rented hall above a stable with an almost exclusively French Canadian congregation, St. Jean Baptiste has grown to be one of New York's most distinctive Catholic churches. It has been through three buildings in two locations and under the care of two different orders of priests.

=== 1841–82: Establishment of parish ===
In the early 19th century, one in every nine New Yorkers was of French descent. Most were Huguenots, Protestant refugees from the French Revolution, but there were some Catholics. In 1841, Bishop de Forbin-Janson, on a missionary tour to the United States for the Fathers of Mercy, lamented that French-American Catholics in New York City had not been as devoted to raising churches in their national customs as Irish and Italian immigrants had. The community responded to this challenge, and accordingly the first Church of St. Vincent de Paul was opened the next year on Canal Street.

That church grew, and moved north to 23rd Street in 1868. A French Canadian immigrant community had begun to flourish in Yorkville at that time, and found it trying to make the trip downtown for services. A missionary to this community found that services closer to home would be beneficial, similar to those the Jesuits at what is now St. Ignatius Loyola had organized for Yorkville's Germans. The order's provincial gave his support for the establishment of a national parish, and a meeting of the immigrants' St. Jean Societé in 1881 raised $12 ($400 in contemporary dollars) to that end. This is considered the beginning of the church's history.

A chapel was established in a rented hall above a stable on East 77th Street. The constant noise from the horses downstairs earned the chapel the nickname "Crib of Bethlehem" from congregants. A few months later, Cardinal John McCloskey, Archbishop of the Diocese of New York and the first American cardinal, granted permission to build a church, formalizing the parish. The new parish was able to raise $14,000 ($467,000 in contemporary dollars) to buy a property on the north side of East 76th Street in 1882. By the end of the year Coadjutor Archbishop (later full Archbishop) Michael Corrigan had blessed the new building's cornerstone.

Napoleon LeBrun's design called for a simple Gothic Revival church building, 100 feet (30 m) long by 40 feet (12 m) wide, with room for 600. Its projected cost was $20,000 ($691,000 in contemporary dollars) but it soon ran into difficulties when problems with using the "crib of Bethlehem" forced the use of the unfinished church's basement during Lent in 1883. Archbishop Corrigan had to take title to the church to save it.

=== 1882–1900: First church and St. Anne's shrine ===
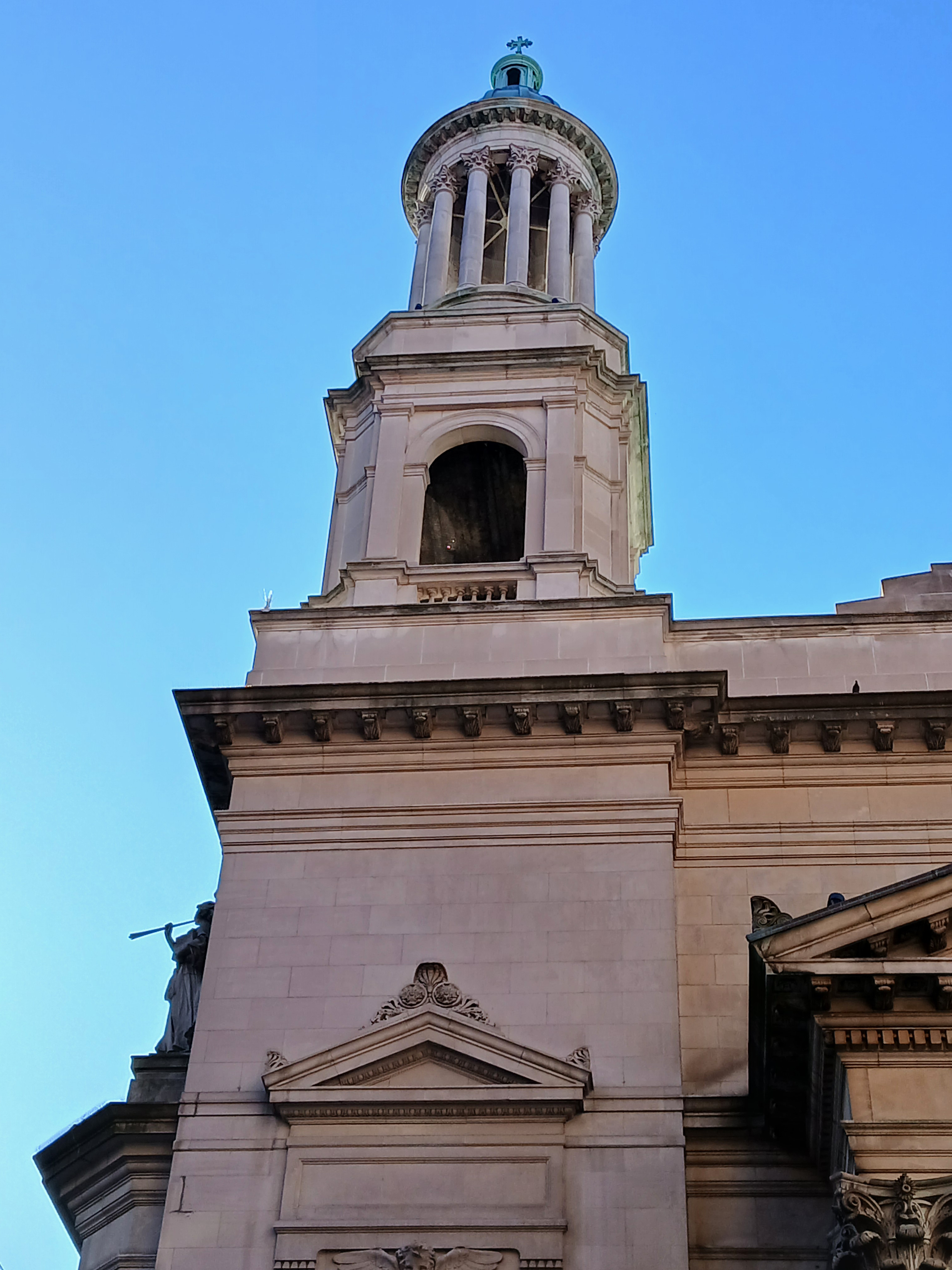
Close-up of the northern bell tower

The new church was successful not only with its intended French Canadian community, but with all Catholics on the Upper East Side. Many were servants in the nearby houses of the city's wealthier residents and had to report for their jobs early, thus appreciating a nearby church where they could first attend Mass. In 1886, nuns from the Congregation of Notre Dame, founded in colonial Montreal in the mid-17th century, came to establish an elementary school.

In 1892, the church inadvertently became a shrine of St. Anne. A Canadian priest, Father J.C. Marquis, dropped in at the rectory unexpectedly on May 1, needing a place to stay while he carried a relic of the saint that Pope Leo XIII had given him back to Sainte-Anne-de-Beaupré, Quebec. The pastor at the time asked him to expose it to the parishioners during vespers that evening. Marquis did so, as he would continue to Quebec the next day.

News that the relic would be exposed soon reached the community, and a large crowd showed up for evening services. When a young man having an epileptic seizure was touched by it, his convulsions ceased. That apparent miracle was widely reported and even more crowds showed up, many expecting cures. The pastor asked Marquis to stay for a few more days with the relic to satisfy the many pilgrims.

His stay would be extended to three weeks as thousands of pilgrims came. As he finally left on May 20, crowds bade the relic farewell and asked that she return again for good next time. Father Marquis was so impressed that he promised to obtain a relic for St. Jean. With the permission of Cardinal Elzéar-Alexandre Taschereau, he divided the relic once he had reached Sainte-Anne and returned to New York with it in July. More crowds came, more miracles were reported, and Marquis reported favorably on this to the pope. As a result, he was able to make a return trip to the shrine of St. Anne in Apt, France, and brought a relic back specifically for St. Jean Baptiste.

=== 1900–18: Change in leadership and new church ===
In 1900 the efforts of a wealthy local Catholic activist, Eliza Lummis, brought the Congregation of the Blessed Sacrament (SSS), an international religious order of priests, brothers, and deacons founded by St. Peter Julian Eymard in Paris in 1856, to New York. They were unable to find a center for their work, but often attended Mass and resided at the St. Jean Baptiste rectory. One day, the pastor joked to the Blessed Sacrament priests that if they could not find a church, he'd just have to give them his. That remark got back to Archbishop Corrigan, who informed St. Jean Baptiste's pastor the very next day that he was putting St. Jean Baptiste under the Congregation of the Blessed Sacrament's control. Throughout the rest of the year the interior of the LeBrun church was altered to be more in keeping with the Congregation's Eucharistic style of worship.

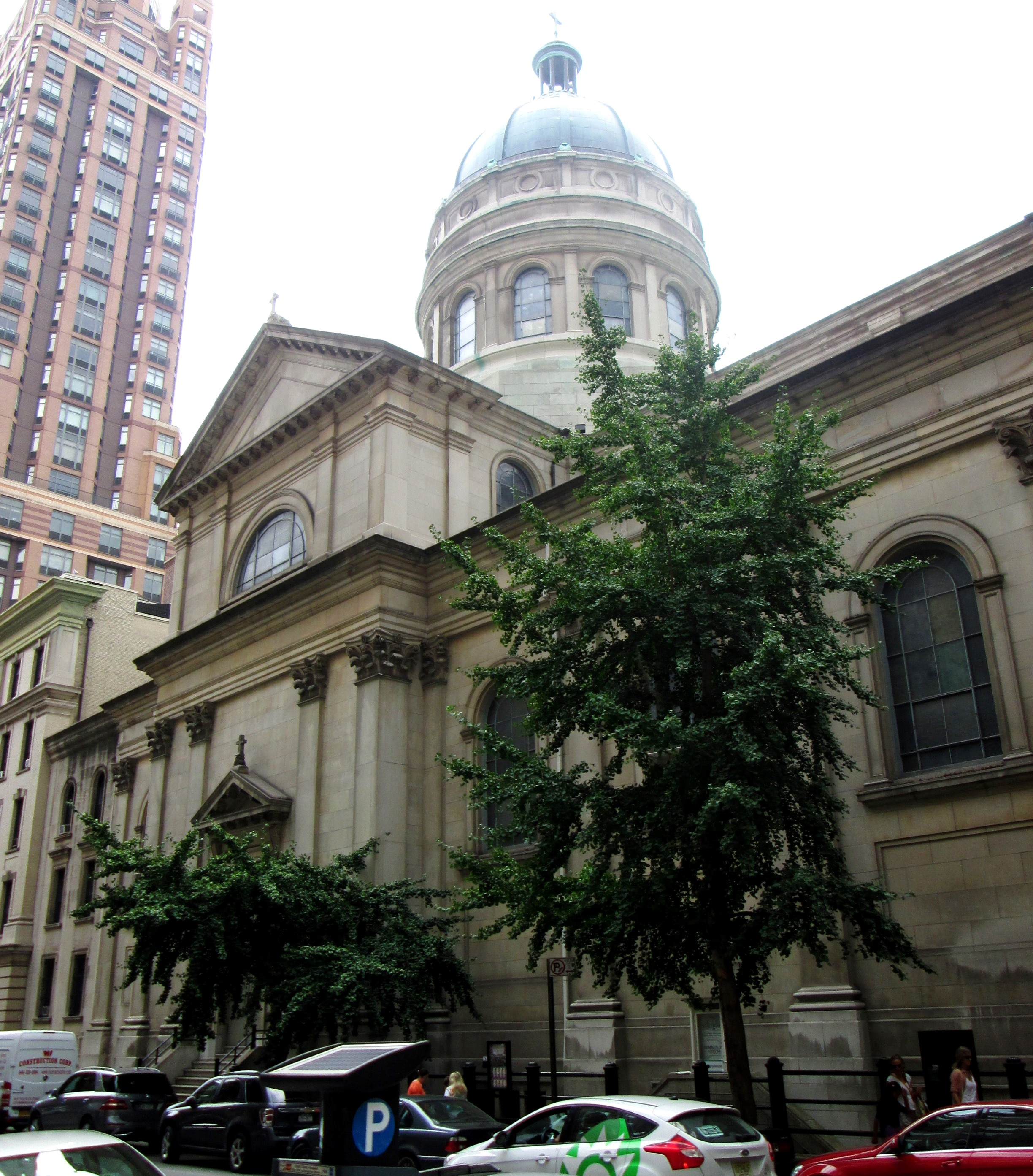
East 76th Street facade (2014)

The continuous exposure of the Sacrament, and the availability of daily confessions and early Mass at what was known as "Old St. Jean's" led to another increase in the size of the congregation. Corrigan had said at the first Mass that he expected the church would soon be outgrown and a new one built more worthy of Christ. During one Mass, financier and philanthropist Thomas Fortune Ryan, a Virginian who converted to Catholicism as a young man and who, with his wife Ida Barry Ryan, supported the construction of churches, schools, and other charitable institutions along the Eastern Seaboard, arrived late and had to stand. He preferred St. Jean to the larger churches closer to his Fifth Avenue mansion, and often attended services there. He heard Father Arthur Letellier, the new pastor, ask the congregation's prayers for a new church, and afterwards asked how much one would cost. "About $300,000" ($10.8 million in contemporary dollars) he was told. "Very well", he replied. "Have your plans made and I will pay for the church".

At first Ryan had wanted a church similar in size to the existing one, but Letellier persuaded him it was time for a church with room for 1,200 people, twice the LeBrun church's capacity. Italian architect Nicholas Serracino, who had been living in New York for the decade, won the commission. He produced a model of a grand Renaissance Revival church with a dome and classically inspired front facade. His design reflected Catholics' search for a unique architectural style for their churches, since the Gothic Revival and neo-Gothic designs had become associated with Protestant churches. In 1911 Serracino's renderings of the unfinished church won first prize at the International Exhibition in Turin.

Ryan was initially skeptical of the dome, but when he saw how it won praise on a model of Serracino's design he authorized the additional $43,000 ($1.49 million in contemporary dollars) for it. This would not be the only cost overrun. Serracino underestimated the costs of local labor and materials. Bedrock was 25 feet (7.6 m) deeper than originally believed because of the marshes filled in when the area was originally developed in the mid-19th century. The cost of the foundation increased eightfold as a result, and plans to gild the dome and finish the interior with marble had to be canceled. The widening of Lexington Avenue also forced Serracino to scale back his original plans for a grand triumphal arch portico with full-width steps. Ryan continued to provide funds for a final total cost of $600,000 ($19.5 million in contemporary dollars).

The rectory, also designed by Serracino, was built and opened in 1911. The lower church in the basement was finished and consecrated in 1913 by Camillus Paul Maes, bishop of the Roman Catholic Diocese of Covington, who had been the Congregation's strongest supporter in the US. Early in the following year, he attended the first Mass celebrated in the upper church, even before the walls and ceilings were finished, by Father Letellier. Cardinal John Murphy Farley, the archbishop, spoke at the end of the service and read a congratulatory telegram from Pope Pius X.

=== 1918–87: The church in a changing city ===
Within a few years of its construction, the new church twice became a crime scene. The first occasion was the night of November 30, 1918, when police pursued a man named Charles George into the church following a carjacking. The police and George had been exchanging gunfire, and it continued as he ran up the stairs into the choir. When he ran out of ammunition, he surrendered. Several women who had been praying in the church at the time had to be treated for hysteria. Almost a year later, on November 29, 1919, Cecilia Simon, a maid at an East 56th Street home, was arrested in the church when she knocked statuary and a candelabra valued at $3,000 ($56,000 in contemporary dollars) onto the floor and shattering them after a funeral service. She was taken to Bellevue Hospital for observation. While apparently a devout enough Catholic to be a daily communicant, she was not a member of the church. At services there the previous Sunday, investigators found that in a collection envelope she had placed a note registering her objection to the arrangement on the altar. A coworker said that she had been acting strangely all week and had said she was going to "do some good work" at church that day.

In 1920 Mayor John Francis Hylan and Governor Al Smith were among the 100,000 Catholics who signed a petition to the new pope, Benedict XV, to designate St. Jean Baptiste a basilica. It failed. Later in the decade the church's interior decoration was gradually installed and finished. Ryan's funeral was held in the church he had paid so much to build in 1928. In 1929 the sisters of Notre Dame opened a high school to go with the elementary school they had been running for almost 40 years.

The interior of the church was modified slightly in the 1950s during renovations. The Requiem Mass for Ryan's grandson Clendenin J. Ryan, publisher of The American Mercury, was held there in 1957 after his suicide. In the 1960s, following Vatican II, the church began to change, as much due to the changing demographics of its parish as the council. It stopped celebrating Mass in French, and the elementary school was closed nearly ninety years after its founding. In 1969 the city made the church one of its first designated landmarks. The next year crime once again intruded into the church when an elderly woman was stabbed on a staircase within by three youths.

=== 1987–present: Renovation ===
In 1989 stones from the facade fell onto the Lexington Avenue sidewalk. No one was injured, but the church had to erect a wooden shelter to protect pedestrians from potential future incidents. That led to the restoration of the exterior over the next year, part of a $6 million campaign that began in 1987. Work on the stained glass windows proved particularly challenging because the original installers had forced them into spaces too small for them, making them hard to remove. It was necessary to hire more than the usual number of restorers, work overtime and locate the workshop in the dome rather than offsite in order to meet the church's fall 1997 deadlines. For several months during that time services were held in a nearby school auditorium. The renovations were overseen by the firm of Hardy Holzman Pfeiffer.

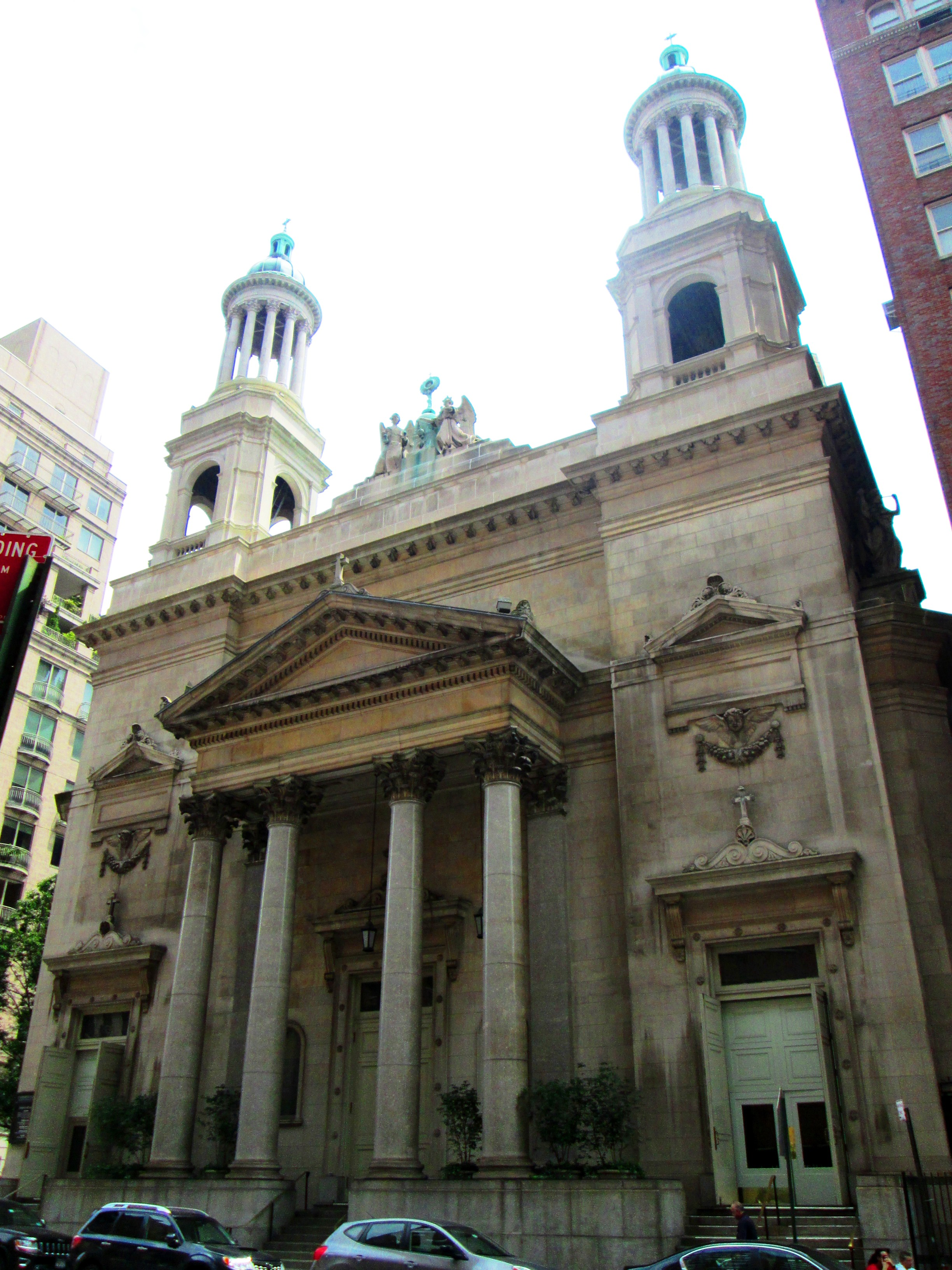
View from the southwest (2014)

It was financed by the sale of land and air rights over a building formerly used as a convent by the sisters of Notre Dame, who subsequently moved into the upper floors of the rectory. A developer built The Siena, a 73-unit, 31-story luxury condominium tower, on the site. It has been praised by a group of architects including Robert A.M. Stern for complementing the architecture of the adjacent rectory by echoing the church's bell towers and offering "rich sculptural form and lively surface patterning ... to a neighborhood burdened by so many uninspired blocklike apartment buildings"

In 2002, a longtime parishioner, Maryanne Macaluso, alleged that the new pastor, Father Mario Marzocchi, had groped and propositioned her after offering her a secretarial position. After she complained to another priest and took paid leave due to the stress of having to see Father Mazocchi every day, the order had him evaluated by a psychologist who found nothing wrong with him, and then transferred him to a parish in Florida. When she returned to work, she claims the church retaliated against her by cutting her work hours from full-time to part-time after several weeks and giving duties she normally performed to others. When she asked the replacement pastor, Father Anthony Schueler, for full-time work, he informed her that the church could not afford to do so and she requested a letter of termination, putting her in danger of being evicted from her apartment.

After the state denied her unemployment claim on the grounds that she had left work voluntarily, Macaluso filed suit against the church, the order, the Archdiocese of New York, Cardinal Edward Egan, and Father Marzocchi. She alleged negligent hiring and hostile environment sexual harassment. In 2007 Judge Louis York of the New York Supreme Court dismissed her claims, without ruling on the facts, against all but Father Marzocchi, who had not responded.

== Programs and services ==
The church celebrates Mass three times a day and five times on Sunday, with a Saturday night vigil. The Eucharist is exposed for prayer and contemplation at all other times. Confession is available for a half-hour daily and twice on Saturdays. The Liturgy of the Hours is observed twice daily and once on Sundays. Devotions to St. Anne are observed twice on Tuesday with an annual novena observed leading up to her July 26 feast day, to the Congregation of the Blessed Sacrament's founder St. Peter Julien Eymard after Thursday's Masses, and to the Sacred Heart of Jesus after Friday evening Mass. The Rosary is prayed at noon Monday through Saturday.

The church's musical ministry is led by its organist, who also directs two choirs, one of volunteers and the other professionals. A thrift shop is run in the basement, next to the community center. A toddler play group and senior group are held there at different times of the week. Also in the basement is the Kathryn Martin Theater, which has hosted a number of musical performances, both church- and non-church-related.

In the broader community, the church, in conjunction with the sisters of Notre Dame, continues to operate St. Jean Baptiste High School for girls. The congregation is a member of the Yorkville Common Pantry and the Neighborhood Coalition for Shelter. The community center is also available for rent to individuals and organizations.

== See also ==
- List of New York City Designated Landmarks in Manhattan from 59th to 110th Streets
- National Register of Historic Places listings in Manhattan from 59th to 110th Streets
