= St. Gabriel's Roman Catholic Church (Bronx) =

St. Gabriel's Church
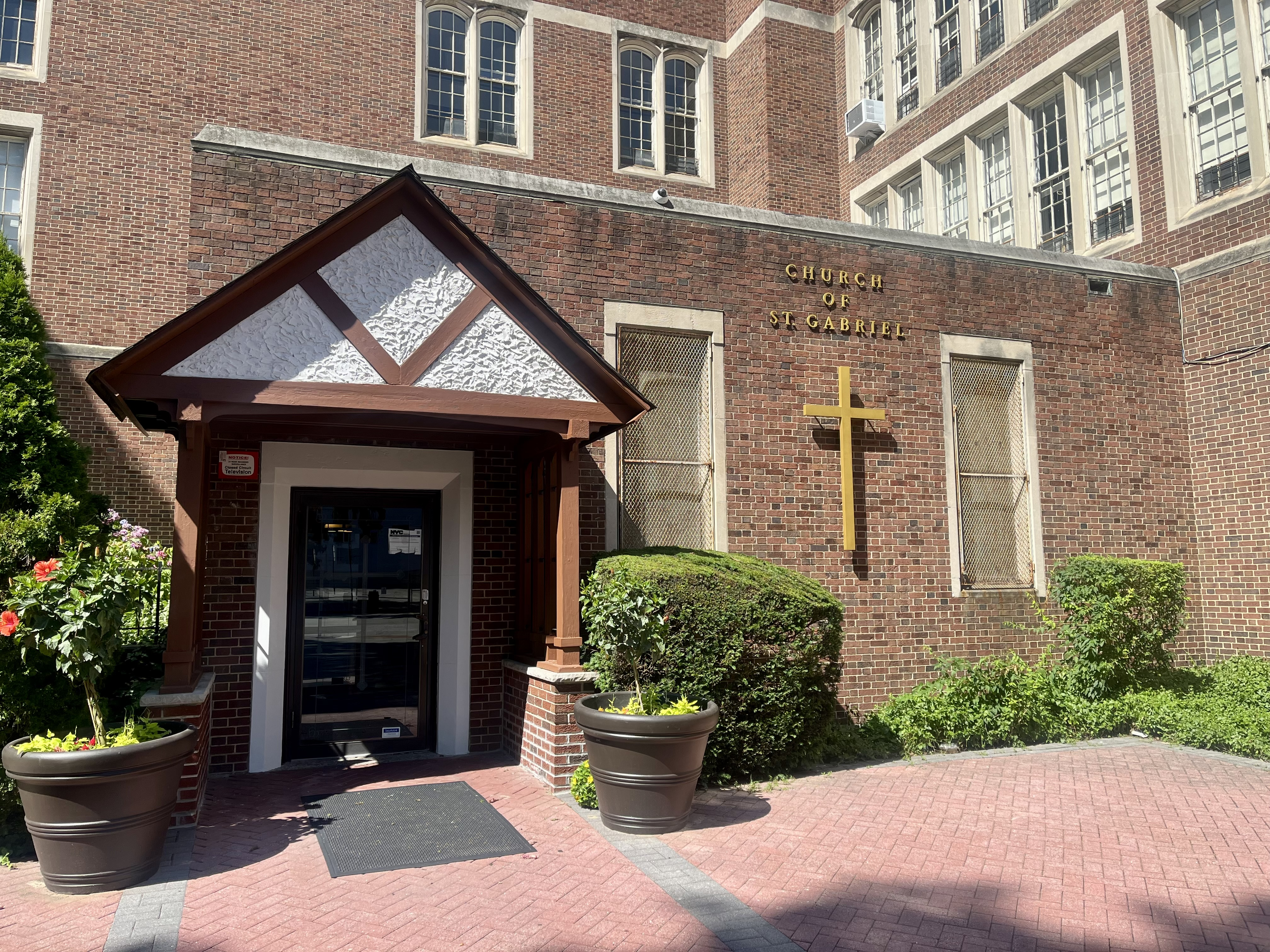
- The church in 2025
- St. Gabriel's Church
- 40°53′6.66″N 73°54′42.62″W
- Location: 3250 Arlington Ave; The Bronx (Riverdale), New York City
- Country: United States
- Denomination: Roman Catholic
- Website: www.stgabrielsinthebronx.org

Architecture
- Completed: 1939

Administration
- Archdiocese: New York
- Parish: St. Gabriel

Clergy
- Pastor: Brian P. McCarthy

St. Gabriel's Roman Catholic Church is a parish located in the Riverdale section of The Bronx, New York. The parish was created in 1939 by Francis Spellman, then the Archbishop of New York, as the successor to the St. Gabriel's Church on East 37th Street in Manhattan, which was razed in 1937 to accommodate the construction of the Queens–Midtown Tunnel. A total of 28 lots were purchased on the south side of West 235th Street between Arlington and Netherland avenues to house the new church, school, and rectory.

The pews, altars and statues of the original church were relocated to the new structure, and many of the church's Irish-American congregants also moved to the Bronx to be near their parish. Francis W. Walsh, pastor of the Church of the Assumption in Peekskill, New York, and president of the College of New Rochelle, was named pastor – a post he held until his retirement in 1969.

The St. Gabriel's complex encompasses a church, elementary school and rectory. In 2004, St. Gabriel's was at the center of a zoning debate when a real estate developer unsuccessfully attempted to pay $7.2 million to build a new church and rectory and to renovate the church's school in exchange for the sale of air rights to build a 30-story condominium on the site of the rectory.
