= St. Ann Church (East Harlem) =

Church in Manhattan, New York

Coordinates: 40°47′34.05″N 73°56′24.06″W

St. Ann's Church
- Parish of St. Ann and St. Lucy
- St. Ann's Church
- Location: 312 East 110th Street; New York, NY 10029
- Country: United States
- Denomination: Roman Catholic

History
- Former name: Parish of St. Ann
- Founded: 1911
- Founder(s): Father Cardi, P.S.M.
- Dedication: Saint Ann

Architecture
- Architect(s): Nicholas Serracino (church); Edward F. Fanning (school)
- Architectural type: church
- Years built: 1911-1913
- Construction cost: $50,000 (church); $175,000 (school)

Administration
- Archdiocese: Archdiocese of New York

St. Ann's Church is a Roman Catholic parish church in the Roman Catholic Archdiocese of New York, located at 312 East 110th Street, in the East Harlem section of the Borough of Manhattan in New York City.

== History ==
The Parish of St. Ann was established in 1911 at the request of Cardinal John Farley, the Archbishop of New York, under the administration of the Pallotine Fathers, who administered the Parish of Our Lady of Mount Carmel, from which it was formed. It was done to facilitate the Catholic Church's service to the rapidly expanding Italian population in that area of the city.

The new parish was initially served by a small chapel dedicated to St. Ann located on East 112th Street. The first pastor, Father Cardi, a Pallotine, immediately determined to build a suitable church for the parish. For this, the architect Nicholas Serracino was contracted to design the new facility. This was completed and dedicated in 1913.

== Current status ==
In 2015, the Parish of St. Ann was merged with the neighboring Parish of St. Lucy to form the new Parish of St. Ann and St. Lucy, for which this church serves as the parish church. The parish was staffed by the P.I.M.E. Missionaries (Pontifical Institute for Foreign Missions). As of October 2024, the Church of St. Ann and St. Lucy is under the administration of Rev. D'Angelo Jimenez, a priest incardinated in the Archdiocese of New York.

== School ==
The five-story brick parochial school with a slag and tile roof is located at 310-318 East 110th Street. It was built in 1924 to the designs by architect Edward F. Fanning of 134 East 44th Street, and opened in 1926 under the administration of the Filippini Sisters. The Sisters, Servants of the Immaculate Heart of Mary assumed administration of the school in 1984.
