= Donatus Buongiorno =

Italian painter

- Born: Donato Buongiorno; November 11, 1865; Solofra, Avellino, Italy
- Died: October 25, 1935 (aged 69)
- Occupations: Italian and American painter

Donatus Buongiorno (born Donato Buongiorno; November 11, 1865 – October 25, 1935) was an Italian-born American painter of the late 19th and early 20th centuries who worked in Naples and New York.

== Early life and training ==
Donatus Buongiorno was born Donato Buongiorno November 11, 1865, in Solofra, Avellino, Italy, to Biagio Buongiorno (1827–after 1898) and Maddalena Solimine (1825–1866). He left Solofra for Naples in the late 1880s to enroll in the Accademia di Belle Arti di Napoli (Academy of Fine Arts of Naples, formerly known as the Royal Academy of Fine Arts of Naples). He graduated in 1886 and later taught there.

== Residences and nationality ==
He emigrated from Naples to New York City in 1892, and New York remained his base for the next 27 years. He became a naturalized U.S. citizen in 1898. Painting commissions and teaching led him to other American cities including: Boston, Massachusetts; San Francisco, California; Indianapolis, Indiana; Brattleboro, Vermont.

He returned to Italy in 1919 to live full-time, though he continued to travel to the U.S. for work until 1921. Wherever he was based, he always went back to the other country to work for extended periods.

== Career ==
In New York in the 1890s, he executed privately commissioned portraits and worked as a designer in a wallpaper factory. In the early 1900s, Italian American Catholic churches began commissioning him to paint murals and other church decorations. Those works include: “Apotheosis of the Evangelist,” Church of St. Leonard of the Franciscan Fathers; “St. Charles Borromeo,” Church of Sacred Heart; “The Holy Trinity,” Church of St. Peter; all in Boston, Massachusetts. “Episodes of Christ and St. Charles Borromeo,” Church of St. Lazarus in East Boston, Massachusetts. “Fall of the Angels,” St. Michael’s Catholic Church in Brattleboro, Vermont. “The Apotheosis of St. Clara” (sic), St. Clare’s Church; “Our Lady of Peace,” Church of Our Lady of Peace; “Principal Episodes in the Life of Christ, of St. Francis of Assisi, and of St. Anthony of Padua,” Church of the Most Precious Blood; all in New York.

In Italy, in 1908, he worked on the restoration of La Collegiata di San Michele Arcangelo, an important 17th-century church in his hometown of Solofra, Avellino, where he also had an exhibition of paintings . He attended an international art congress of art educators in Rome in 1911, the same year a painting of his was accepted into the prestigious annual show of the Pennsylvania Academy of the Fine Arts in Philadelphia, Pennsylvania.

In addition to murals and portraits, throughout his life he made easel paintings that he sold out of his studios in New York and Naples. He also served as a dealer for other Italian artists whose works he imported into the U.S. and sold in New York, San Francisco and elsewhere.

== Politics and civic life ==
Donatus Buongiorno was naturalized as a U.S. citizen in 1898 and was politically active in the United States.

He painted a large portrait of William McKinley which was commissioned during McKinley's 1896 presidential campaign. An inscription on the back of the canvas indicates later ownership by a New York camp of the USWV (United Spanish–American War Veterans) and cites (USN) Flying Squadron #16, possibly that of Rear Admiral W.S. Schley which launched out of New York on its flagship Brooklyn (CA-3) during the Spanish–American War in 1898.

In 1908, Buongiorno joined other artists in signing a petition to the U.S. Congress opposing tariffs on imported artwork.

That same year, Buongiorno sued a famous stage actor, William Faversham, for non-payment of a fee and won. Although the press heavily implied that Buongiorno tried to intimidate the actor into paying a not-quite-confirmed commission, Buongiorno received a judgment of $29 plus costs two months later. (Other lawsuits and multiple bankruptcies in later years further revealed Faversham’s impecunious history.)

== Death ==
Buongiorno died on October 25, 1935, in a suburb of Naples, Italy.

== Personal life ==
Buongiorno was married to Teresina La Gatta (b. 1863, Pomigliano D’Arco, Campania, Italy) from 1888 to her death in 1919, and possibly to Jean Skene (1879–?) from 1919 to an unknown date, perhaps his death in 1935.

He had one child, with La Gatta, a son, Biagio Buongiorno (1901–1921).

Nick Buongiorno (1908–1985), an American painter, was his nephew.
