= St. Clare Church (Manhattan) =

The Church of St. Clare
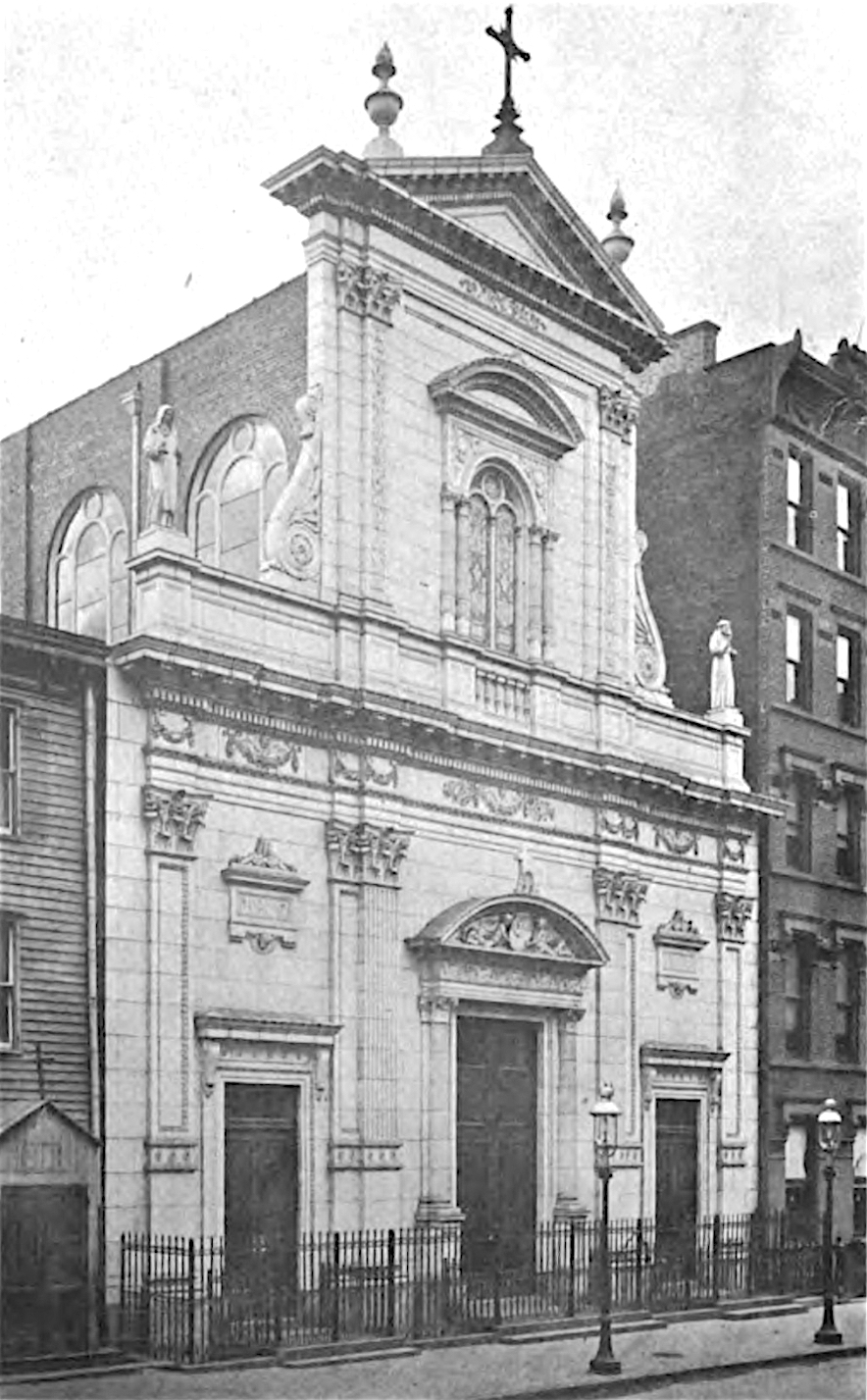
- Alternative names: The Church of Santa Chiara
- Etymology: Clare of Assisi

General information
- Architectural style: Italian Renaissance Revival
- Location: 436–438 West 36th Street, Manhattan, New York City
- Coordinates: 40°45′19.05″N 73°59′49.75″W
- Completed: 1907
- Closed: 1937
- Demolished: c. 1937
- Client: Roman Catholic Archdiocese of New York

Technical details
- Structural system: steel protected with concrete; brick, granite, limestone, and white glazed terra cotta

Design and construction
- Architect: Nicholas Serracino
- Other designers: Donatus Buongiorno (murals)

Other information
- Seating capacity: 800

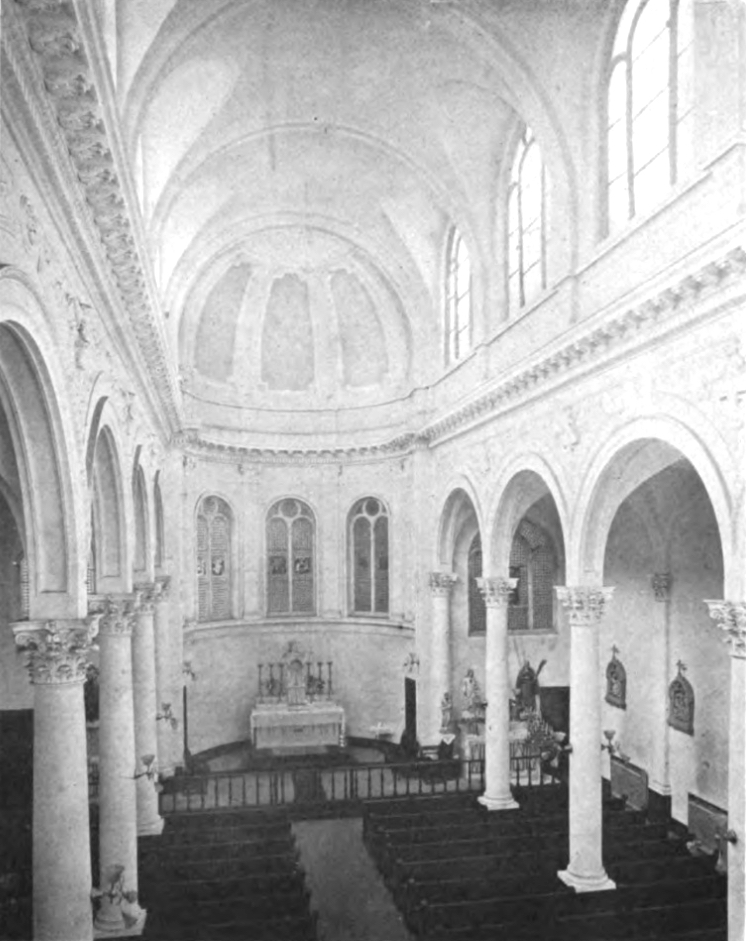
Church interior

The Church of St. Clare is a former parish church under the authority of the Roman Catholic Archdiocese of New York, at 436-438 West 36th Street in Manhattan, New York City.

The parish was established in 1903 and staffed by the Franciscan Friars, with a parochial school staffed by a community of Sisters of St. Francis. The 1907 church building, designed by Nicholas Serracino, was closed in 1937 and razed to provide access for the new Lincoln Tunnel. Donatus Buongiorno painted the murals in the church. Metropolitan Opera baritone Alfredo Gandolfi married soprano Alice Kurkjian at St. Clare Church on February 3, 1934.
