= Nicholas Serracino =

American architect

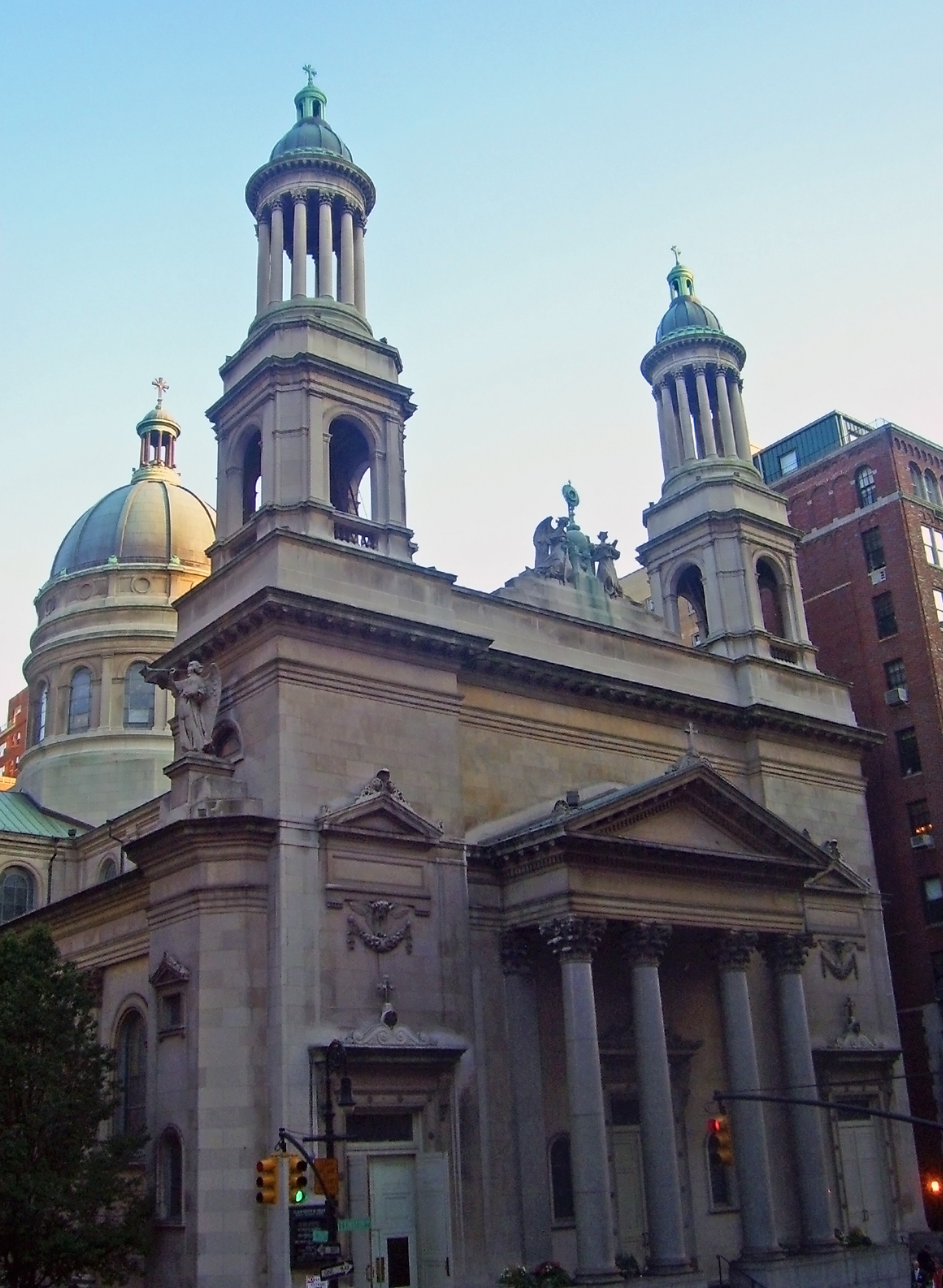
- St. Jean Baptiste Church, west (front) elevation, dome and partial north profile, 2008.
- Born: 4 June 1877
- Died: 31 October 1934 (aged 57)
- Known for: Architect

Nicholas Serracino (1877–1934), AIA, was an American architect active in late-nineteenth- and early twentieth-century New York City. He was principally noted for his designs of churches and parish schools for the Roman Catholic Archdiocese of New York.

He designed St. Jean Baptiste Church and Rectory (1910), one of few Catholic churches in city with a dome and the only one besides St. Patrick's Cathedral (New York City) to have stained glass made in Chartres. This won a prize in an international competition. This was followed by the more modest brick temple-fronted Church of the Sacred Hearts of Mary and Jesus (New York City), built in 1915 for $35,000 and demolished in 2007. His office was located at 1170 Broadway.

== Works ==
- St. Clare Church (Manhattan) (1907)
- St. Jean Baptiste Church and Rectory (1910)
- St. Ann's Church (East Harlem) (1913)
- Church of the Sacred Hearts of Mary and Jesus (New York City) (1915)
