= Child School and Legacy High School =

Private, special education school in Manhattan, New York, United States

The Child School Legacy High School

Location
- Roosevelt Island, New York; United States; 40°45′48″N 73°56′55″W

Information
- Type: Approved private school Special education
- Motto: Learning, Compassion, Respect
- Established: TCS, 1973. LHS, 1996
- Founder: Maari de Souza
- Director: Vishu Grover (executive director)
- Principal: Cindy Ali (Elementary School-Westview Building) E. Victoria Safi (Middle School - Patterson House) Michelle Hagon (LHS-Island House and Eastwood Building)
- Grades: K-12
- Enrollment: ~280
- Campus: Urban
- Color: Multiple
- Sports: Soccer, Basketball, Debating, Softball, Track and Field
- Mascot: White tiger
- Nickname: TCS/LHS
- Website: thechildschool.org

The Child School / Legacy High School (TCS) is a state funding approved private, special education school in Manhattan, New York, United States that instructs students in grades K-12 with learning disabilities. Students are given appropriate accommodations so that they receive full access to a general education curriculum.

== History ==
Founded in 1973, the Child School began in Maari de Souza's apartment building on Roosevelt Island. Maari began to teach children with learning disabilities using her own curriculum which was tailored to each of her students. Eventually, the apartment was converted into a school and more students began to attend. In 1973, the Child School was formed, and in 1979, the Child School was moved to Manhattan. In 1981, a Middle School was added to address the needs of middle schoolers with learning disabilities. In 1996, a high school was added and the Child School was renamed The Child School/Legacy High School. The first graduating class from the high school graduated in 2001. In 2010 Maari De Souza was replaced by Sal Ferrera as the executive director of The Child School/Legacy High School. In 2013, Sal Fererra abruptly resigned for an undisclosed reason. Soon after he resigned from the Roosevelt Island Operating Corporation [RIOC] as well. The executive director position is now held by Vishu Grover.

=== Return to Roosevelt Island ===
In 2003, The Child School returned to Roosevelt Island. Upon its return, the school moved into four separate buildings: an elementary school, a middle school, the Island House, and the Patterson House. The four new building were less crowded, allowing more individual attention and cleaner class rooms. The Island House includes a science lab with state-of-the-art equipment and a flat-screen television. There are also three computer labs.

== Elementary school ==
Established in 1973, the Elementary School educates students from grades K-6. The elementary school has an art room, and a garden. Courses in the elementary school range from motor skills to Mathematics, to Technology and more. In the garden, students plant organic fruits and vegetables. There is park near the school, and sometimes classes are conducted there. Also, students of the elementary and middle schools go on other educational field trips.

== Middle school ==
Initiated in 1991, the Middle School educates students in grades 7–8. The overarching purpose is to promote learning, to meet the unique needs of early adolescents, and to support a successful transition to high school. There is one teacher and teacher assistant for every twelve students (12:1:1).

== Legacy High School ==
Established in 1996, Legacy High School educates students, grades 9–12, with learning disabilities. Legacy is one of the few state approved non-public high schools in New York City.
