= St. Jean Baptiste High School =

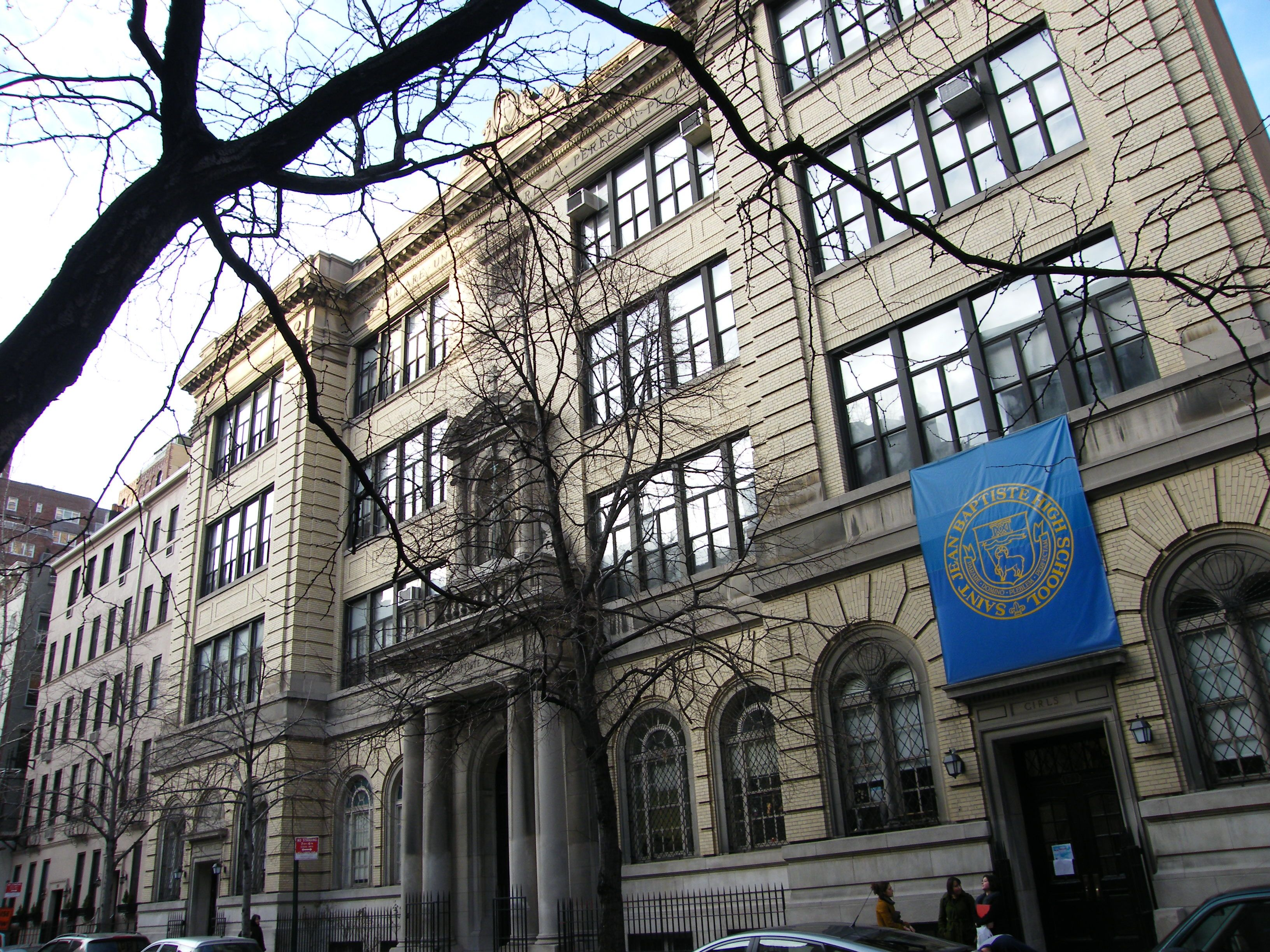

Location
- 173 East 75th Street (Upper East Side, Manhattan); 184 East 76th Street; New York City, New York 10021; United States; 40°46′20″N 73°57′36″W

Information
- Type: Private
- Motto: Parare Domino Plebem Perfectam (To prepare for the Lord a perfect people)
- Religious affiliation: Roman Catholic
- Patron saint: Saint Marguerite Bourgeoys
- Established: 1929 (97 years ago)
- Founder: Saint Marguerite Bourgeoys
- Oversight: Archdiocese of New York
- Dean: Briege Pilch
- Principal: Sr. Maria Cassano, CND
- Head of school: Molly Smith
- Faculty: 27
- Grades: 9–12
- Gender: Girls
- Campus: Urban
- Colors: Blue and gold
- Sports: Soccer, softball, track
- Accreditation: Middle States Association of Colleges and Schools
- Newspaper: Jeanite Journal
- Tuition: $13,500 (2025-2026)
- Admissions Director: Flora Lugo
- Athletics Director: Bobbi Thomas
- Website: stjean.org

St. Jean Baptiste High School is an all-female, private, Roman Catholic high school, located on the Upper East Side of Manhattan in New York City, New York, US.

It is administered by the Congregation of Notre Dame of Montreal and is located within the Roman Catholic Archdiocese of New York.
