= St. Gabriel Church (Manhattan) =

Demolished church in Manhattan, New York

Coordinates: 40°44′46.5″N 73°58′26″W

The Church of St. Gabriel
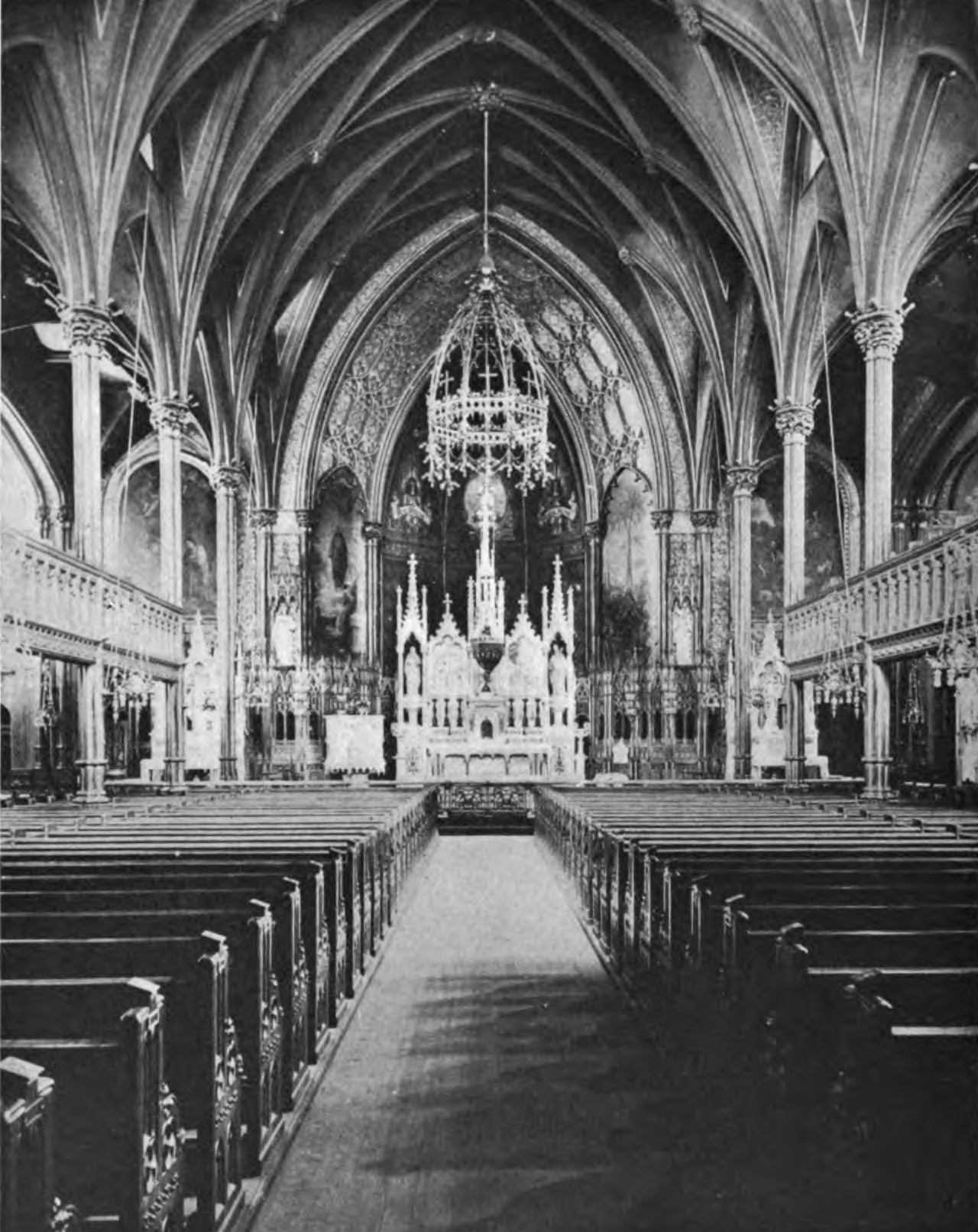
- The interior of St. Gabriel's around 1914
- Interactive map of the The Church of St. Gabriel area

General information
- Architectural style: Gothic Revival
- Location: Manhattan, New York, United States
- Construction started: 1864
- Completed: 1865
- Demolished: May 1939
- Client: Roman Catholic Archdiocese of New York

Technical details
- Structural system: Masonry

Design and construction
- Architect: Henry Engelbert

The Church of St. Gabriel was a parish church under the authority of the Roman Catholic Archdiocese of New York, located at 310 East 37th Street in Murray Hill, Manhattan, New York City, from 1865 to 1939.

== History ==
St. Gabriel's grew out of the Church of St. John the Evangelist on 55th Street. The parish was formed in 1859. Prior to the construction of the church, services were held in a two–story brick building at 306 East 36th Street. The first rector was Rev. William H. Clowry.

Land for the church at the corner of Second Avenue was donated by Henry James Anderson, Professor of Mathematics at Columbia College. A parochial school, located at 311 East 36th Street, was organized in 1860. The first floor of the boys school was the chapel, where Sunday Masses for the 1,500-member congregation were held.

The church was dedicated on November 12, 1865, by Archbishop John McCloskey. In 1885, parishioners donated a marble altar in memory of Father Clowry. Two of St. Gabriel's priests at the turn of the century later served as Cardinal Archbishop of New York, John Murphy Farley and Patrick Joseph Hayes. Farley introduced electric lighting to the church.

St. Gabriel's Select School (for girls) at 229 East 36th Street was conducted by the Sisters of Charity of Mount Saint Vincent. The Brothers of the Christian Schools ran the boys school.

In 1889, the funeral for Fenian Thomas Francis Bourke was held at St. Gabriel's.

St. Gabriel's Park was established in the early 1900s on the block south of the church between 35th and 36th Streets. The park was briefly called Civic Park before it was named after the nearby church.

The parish closed in 1939 to make way for the Queens–Midtown Tunnel linking Manhattan to Queens. The congregation was divided between the Church of the Sacred Hearts of Jesus and Mary and St. Agnes Church. The church building was demolished May 1939. The altar, pews and statues were sent to the newly constructed St. Gabriel's Church in the Riverdale section of the Bronx.

The sacramental records for the now-closed Church of St. Gabriel were transferred to nearby St. Stephen's Church. Early records for the parish school are at the College of Mount Saint Vincent, Riverdale.

== Architecture ==
Construction of a church building was delayed because of the American Civil War. The building was designed by architect Henry Engelbert in the Gothic Revival-style. The cornerstone was laid in 1864. The structure was brick with a brownstone façade and brownstone accents. The brownstone was quarried in Belleville, New Jersey. The groined ceiling rested on eighteen columns. The chancel featured a large painting of the Annunciation, by artist Giuseppe Mazzolini. Two side altars were dedicated to the Blessed Virgin and St. Joseph, respectively.
