= Queens–Midtown Tunnel =

Tunnel in New York City

Overview
- Official name: Queens Midtown Tunnel
- Other name: Midtown Tunnel
- Location: Manhattan and Queens, New York City, New York, US
- Coordinates: 40°44′44″N 73°57′53″W
- Route: I-495 Toll
- Crosses: East River

Operation
- Opened: November 15, 1940; 86 years ago
- Operator: MTA Bridges and Tunnels
- Traffic: 73,470 (2016)
- Toll: Both directions: Tunnel toll as of August 6, 2023, $11.19 (Tolls By Mail and non-New York E-ZPass); $6.94 (New York E-ZPass); $9.11 (Mid-Tier NYCSC E-Z Pass); Manhattan-bound only: Variable congestion charge incurred upon exit

Technical
- Length: 6,414 feet (1,955 m) (northern tube); 6,272 feet (1,912 m) (southern tube)
- No. of lanes: 4
- Operating speed: 40 miles per hour (64 km/h)
- Tunnel clearance: 12 feet 1 inch (3.68 m)

Route map

The Queens–Midtown Tunnel (often referred to as the Midtown Tunnel) is a vehicular tunnel under the East River in New York City, connecting the boroughs of Manhattan and Queens. The tunnel consists of a pair of tubes, each carrying two lanes. The west end of the tunnel is located on the East Side of Midtown Manhattan, while the east end of the tunnel is located in Long Island City in Queens. Interstate 495 (I-495) runs the entire length of the tunnel; I-495's western terminus is at the Manhattan portal of the tunnel.

The Queens–Midtown Tunnel was first planned in 1921, though the plans for the tunnel were modified over the following years. By the 1930s, the tunnel was being proposed as the Triborough Tunnel, which would connect Queens and Brooklyn with the east and west sides of Manhattan. The New York City Tunnel Authority finally started construction on the tunnel in 1936, although by then, the plans had been downsized to a connector between Queens and the east side of Manhattan. The tunnel, designed by Ole Singstad, was opened to traffic on November 15, 1940.

The Queens–Midtown Tunnel is owned by New York City and operated by MTA Bridges and Tunnels, an affiliate agency of the Metropolitan Transportation Authority. It is used by several dozen express bus routes. From 1981 to 2016, the Queens–Midtown Tunnel was also the site of the Ringling Bros. and Barnum & Bailey Circus Animal Walk.

== Description ==
The Queens–Midtown Tunnel consists of two tubes that each carry two traffic lanes. The southern tube normally carries eastbound traffic to Queens, and the northern tube normally carries westbound traffic to Manhattan. During the morning rush hour, one lane in the southern tube is used as a westbound high-occupancy vehicle lane. The 6,414-foot-long (1,955 m) northern tube is slightly longer than the 6,272-foot-long (1,912 m) southern tube. This is because the tubes' portals in Queens are located side by side, while the Manhattan portals are slightly offset from each other.

=== Route ===
The Queens–Midtown Tunnel's eastern end is in Long Island City, where Interstate 495 (I-495) descends from a viaduct into the tunnel. A toll plaza was formerly located here. Exits 13 and 14 for I-495 are located just east of the former toll plaza. Exit 13 is located right underneath the Pulaski Bridge and contains an eastbound-only exit and entrance to and from Borden Avenue. Exit 14, located immediately east of exit 13, contains an eastbound exit and westbound entrance to the tunnel from New York State Route 25A (21st Street). Eastbound traffic entering from Exit 13 intersects with traffic exiting to Exit 14, which must stop and yield to each other. Westbound traffic entering from Exit 14 can enter the tunnel from either 21st Street or 50th Avenue; there is no westbound exit. Although exits 13 and 14 are sequential exit numbers on I-495, they are actually the first and second numbered exits on I-495. The exits from the Manhattan side are not numbered.

The tubes travel under the East River until they are directly below 42nd Street on the Manhattan side, then curve south under First Avenue. The tubes then turn west between 36th and 37th Streets.

Both tubes surface east of Second Avenue in Midtown Manhattan. The westbound roadway passes underneath Second Avenue and continues west for a half-block, where it splits into three exit ramps. One ramp continues westbound to 37th Street, while the other two connect to Tunnel Exit Street, which runs south to 34th Street and north to 41st Street. The northernmost block of Tunnel Exit Street, between 40th and 41st Streets, was sold to private interests in 1961 but continues to be in public use. The southern tube rises to ground level east of Second Avenue, where it is fed by eastbound traffic on 36th Street, as well as by entrance ramps from the north and south. These entrance ramps, collectively referred to as Tunnel Approach Street, run between Second and First Avenues from 34th Street to 40th Street. Electronic toll gantries are located just outside the Manhattan portals.

The Manhattan side was originally also supposed to link with the proposed Mid-Manhattan Expressway and the East River (FDR) Drive, though neither connection was built. Additionally, the Queens side was to have connected to an expressway that would have reached to the Rockaway Peninsula.

=== Route designation ===
The tunnel was once designated as part of New York State Route 24. In the mid-1940s, NY 24 was routed to follow the Crosstown Connecting Highway and the Queens–Midtown Expressway between Queens Boulevard in Woodside, Queens, and the Queens–Midtown Tunnel. NY 24 continued through the tunnel and ended at First and Second Avenues in Manhattan, which at the time were designated as NY 1A. The Crosstown Connection Highway and the Midtown Highway were upgraded into the first portions of the Brooklyn–Queens Expressway (BQE) and the Queens Midtown Expressway, respectively, in the early 1950s. NY 24 was rerouted along the LIE between the Queens–Midtown Tunnel and Farmingdale, New York, in the late 1950s, and the designation was removed from the LIE altogether c. 1962. The expressway and tunnel were designated as I-495 c. 1960.

=== Features ===
The two tubes were built with an exterior diameter of 31 feet (9.4 m), a roadway 21 feet (6.4 m) wide, and a maximum vehicular height limit of 13 feet 1 inch (3.99 m). As of 2015, the vehicular height limit is 12 feet 1 inch (3.68 m), and the width limit is 8 feet 6 inches (2.59 m). The portals of each tube contain flood doors weighing 20 short tons (18 long tons; 18 t) and measuring 2 feet (0.61 m) thick, 14 feet (4.3 m) across, and 29 feet (8.8 m) tall.

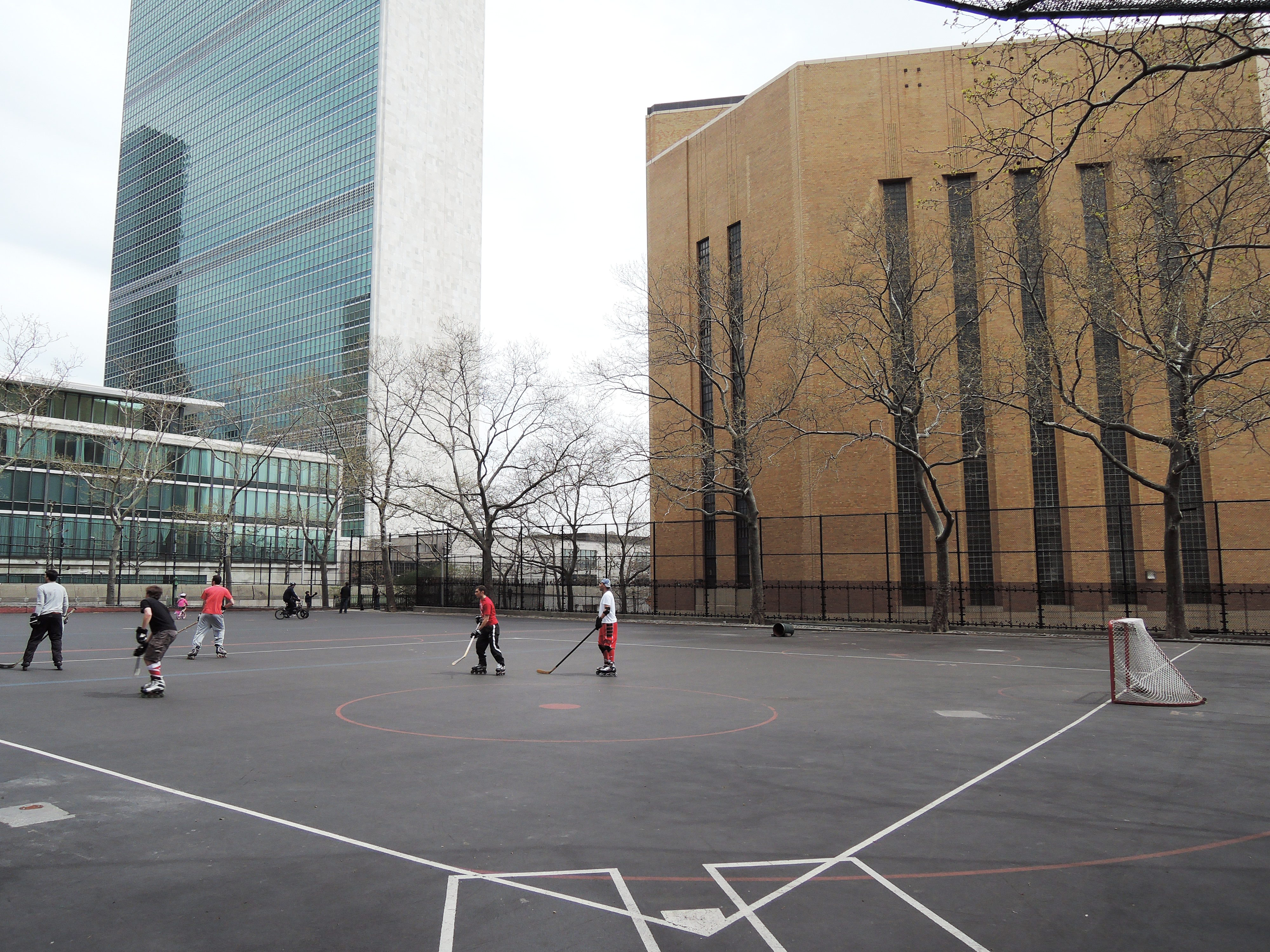
The Robert Moses Playground, next to the tunnel's Manhattan ventilation building and the headquarters of the United Nations.

The tunnel contains two ventilation buildings, one on each side of the East River. Both ventilation towers are 100-foot-tall (30 m) orange brick structures in the Art Deco style. The tower on the Manhattan side is an octagon-shaped structure located on a city-owned block bounded by 41st and 42nd Streets, First Avenue, and the FDR Drive. This block is shared with the Robert Moses Playground, a playground operated by the New York City Department of Parks and Recreation (NYC Parks), which was built along with the tunnel and opened in 1941. The Queens side's ventilation building is a rectangular tower located in the center of Borden Avenue between Second and Fifth Streets. Due to its location in the middle of Borden Avenue, traffic along the road drives around the building. The two buildings originally contained a combined 23 fans, which were replaced in the mid-2000s. The ventilation system is capable of completely filtering the tubes' air within 90 seconds.

The Queens portal also abuts the small Bridge and Tunnel Park, which is bounded by the Pulaski Bridge on the west, 50th Avenue on the north, 11th Place on the east, and the Queens–Midtown Tunnel entrance ramp on the south. The park opened in 1979, and is operated by the Triborough Bridge and Tunnel Authority (TBTA; now MTA Bridges and Tunnels). NYC Parks owns the land that constitutes Bridge and Tunnel Park.

== History ==
=== Initial proposal ===
The Queens–Midtown Tunnel was originally proposed in 1921 by Manhattan's borough president, Julius Miller. The plan resurfaced in 1926 under the names Triborough Tunnel and alternatively 38th Street Tunnel. Miller, in conjunction with Queens' borough president, Maurice E. Connolly, proposed the $58 million tunnel as a connector from Midtown Manhattan to Long Island City in Queens, and to Greenpoint in Brooklyn. At the time, there was frequent and heavy congestion on bridges across the East River, which separated Manhattan from the boroughs of Queens and Brooklyn on Long Island. Brooklyn borough president James J. Byrne expressed his displeasure at the fact that the Queens and Manhattan borough presidents had proposed the Triborough Tunnel without consulting him first. That December, Mayor James J. Walker formed a commission to study traffic congestion on New York City bridges and tunnels. Local civic groups felt that it would be inadequate to simply increase capacity on existing crossings like the Queensboro Bridge, since there were no roads connecting Long Island with Midtown Manhattan. The city ultimately declined to give its immediate support to the Triborough Tunnel proposal.

In April 1927, civic groups formed the 38th Street Tunnel Committee to advocate for the tunnel. The groups stated that the tunnel would act as a relief corridor for traffic from midtown Manhattan, which at the time had to use other crossings to the north or south. That June, the city voted to allocate $100,000 toward surveying sites and making test bores. Following news of this allotment, several more civic groups expressed support for the tunnel and urged that it be completed as soon as possible. By February 1929, thirty-five civic groups supported the construction of the tunnel.

Simultaneously, civic groups proposed a 4.3-mile (6.9 km) system of tunnels under Manhattan, connecting Queens in the east with Weehawken, New Jersey, in the west. The groups proposed that the Queens–Midtown Tunnel connect with the Midtown Hudson (Lincoln) Tunnel, which would cross the Hudson River and continue westward to New Jersey. The planned tunnel would originate at 10th Avenue on Manhattan's west side, run underneath Manhattan streets and the East River, and surface near Borden Avenue at the Long Island City side. The tunnel would contain exits to Oakland Street in Greenpoint, Brooklyn, as well as to Third Avenue in Manhattan. The Fifth Avenue Association further proposed that the city create a bridge-and-tunnel authority to would raise funding and oversee construction and operations. The proposed agency would be similar to the Port of New York Authority, which was constructing and operating Hudson River crossings.

=== Approval ===
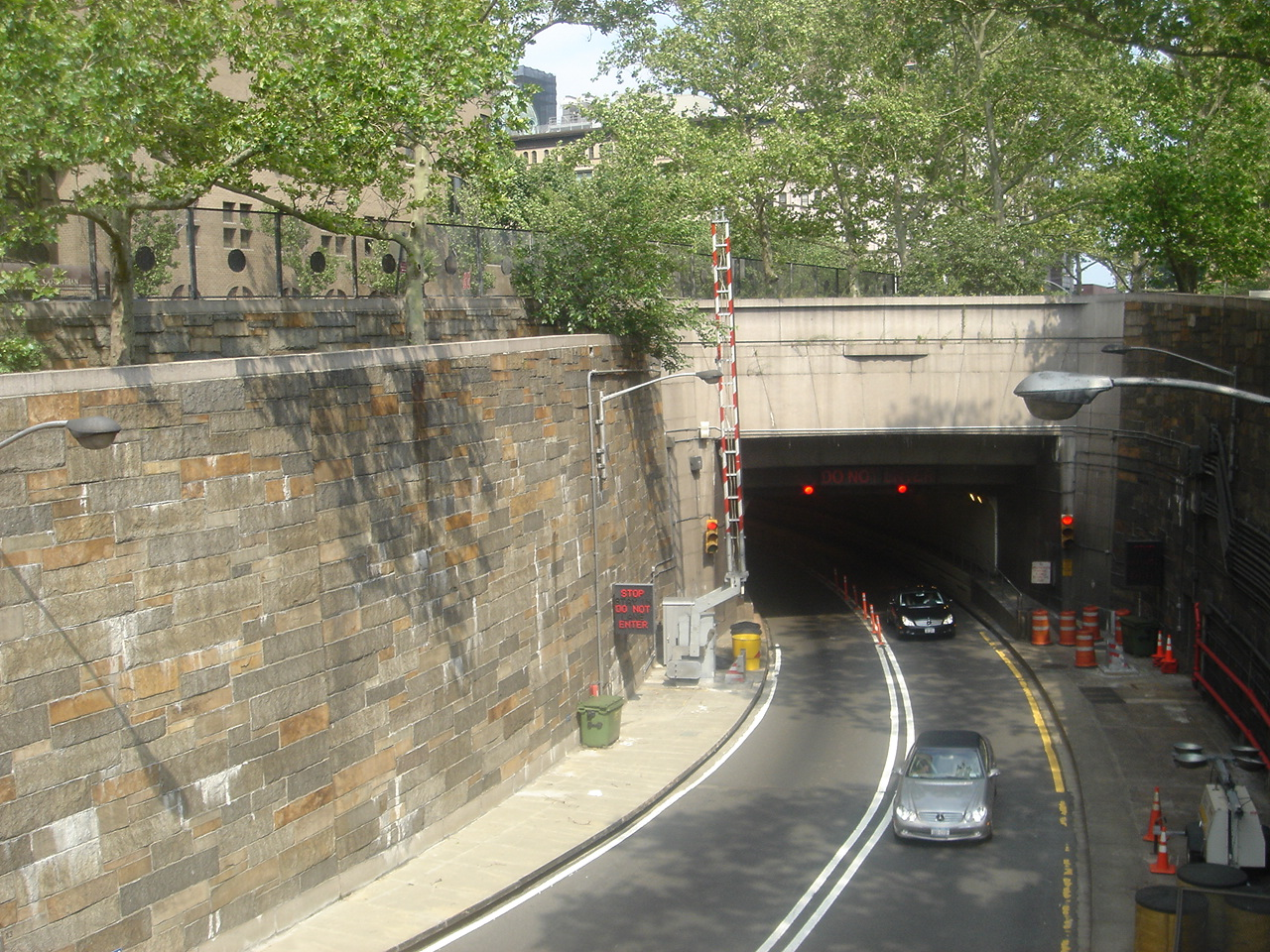
Manhattan portal

The Chamber of Commerce of the State of New York formally endorsed a Queens–Manhattan crossing in January 1929, but stated that the crossing could be either a bridge or a tunnel. The city began conducting a study on the feasibility of constructing the Triborough Tunnel, as well as the Triborough Bridge between Queens, Manhattan, and the Bronx. The study's authors suggested that the city construct a network of parkways and expressways, including a major highway leading from Long Island to the Manhattan-Queens tunnel. The Queens Planning Commission also recommended the construction of the Triborough Tunnel. An official plan for the Triborough Tunnel was released that June. The plan outlined an $86 million system of feeder highways, including the crosstown Manhattan tunnel and the tunnel spur from Brooklyn. The New York City Board of Estimate approved the use of tolls for the tunnel, which would be used toward tunnel maintenance and create revenue for the city. Subsequently, officials expected that tunnel construction could start by the end of that year.

In July 1929, the city was faced with unexpected legal issues. The language of Walker's proclamation ostensibly allowed construction to proceed, but in doing so, tasked the wrong city agency with constructing the Triborough Tunnel. Civic groups convened a special session in which they asked the New York City Board of Estimate to override the laws so the tunnel could be approved. The Board of Estimate ultimately allotted $5 million toward feasibility studies and preliminary construction for the Manhattan–Queens tunnel, as well as another tunnel under the Narrows between Brooklyn and Staten Island. Afterward, the New York City Board of Transportation hurried to submit plans for the Triborough Tunnel's construction.

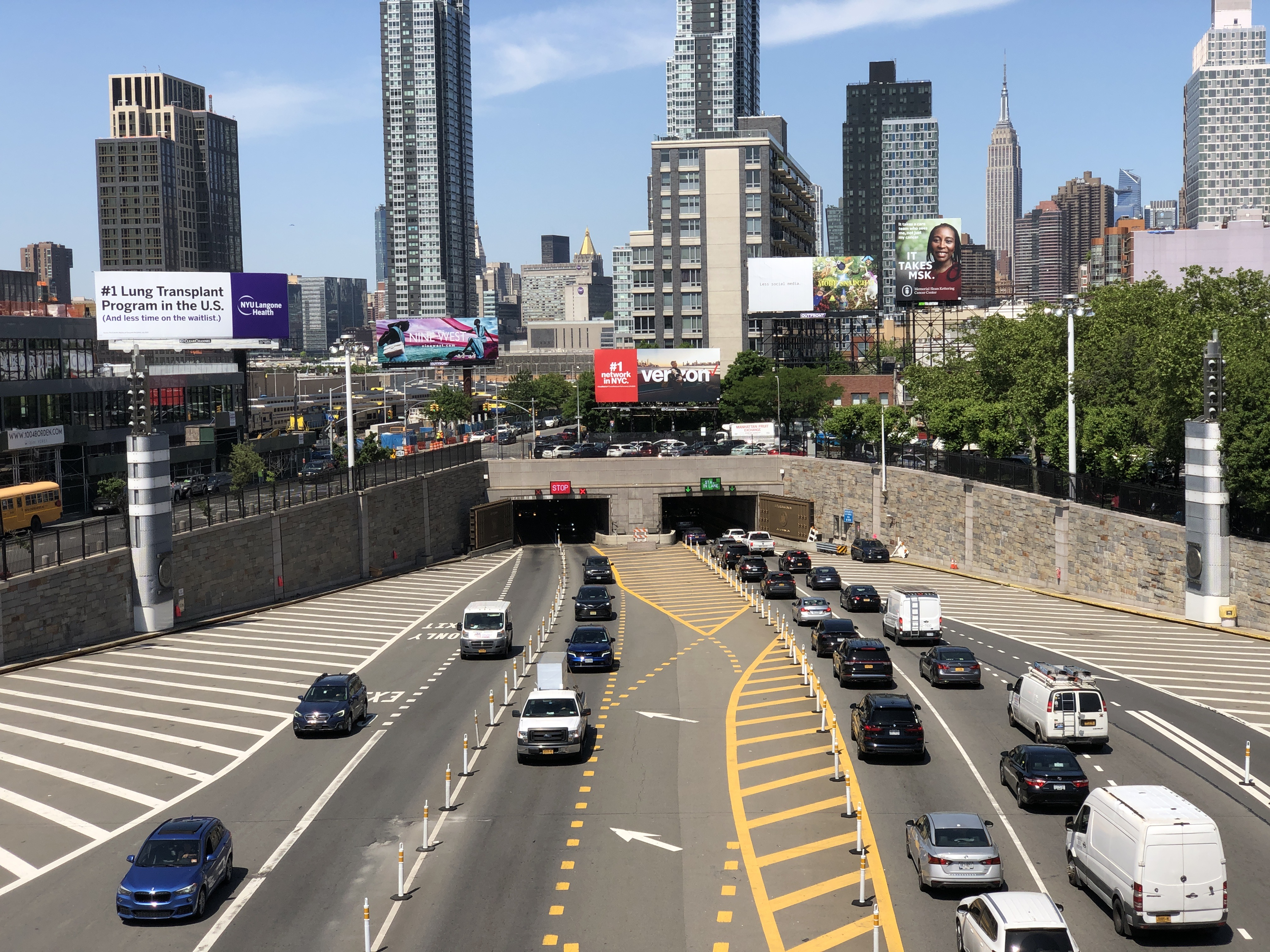
Queens portal

In January 1930, after the Midtown Hudson Tunnel between Manhattan and New Jersey was approved, engineers initiated a study to examine a possible connection with the Triborough Tunnel. Around this time, engineers revised the Triborough Tunnel's eastern approaches, moving the route of the Brooklyn spur from 11th to 21st Street. Exploratory borings were reportedly completed by June 1930. Three months later, the Board of Transportation modified the plans for the tunnel on the Manhattan side. The new plans included a "mixing plaza" at Second Avenue in Manhattan, where the tubes from Queens and from Manhattan's west side would rise to ground level. The eastbound and westbound tubes would respectively run under 37th and 38th Streets, since the streets were too narrow to accommodate two tubes side-by-side. Advocates of the Triborough Tunnel opposed the construction of surface-level exit plazas, saying that the mixing plaza would force motorists to briefly drive along the narrow side streets. One group proposed a crosstown elevated highway in lieu of a tunnel under Manhattan.

In December 1930, the United States Department of War approved the construction of the Triborough Tunnel, since the tube would not hinder maritime navigation during wartime. Even with this approval, the Board of Transportation had delayed construction by several months because of significant public concerns about the crosstown-highway section. In June 1931, the Board of Transportation submitted a detailed revised plan for the Triborough Tunnel to the Board of Estimate. The project was now expected to cost $93.6 million, including the $23.5 million alignment under the East River and within Queens. That October, the Board of Estimate allocated $200,000 for planning. It was expected that construction would start in March 1932 and the East River segment would be complete by 1936. By July 1932, no contracts had been awarded because of a lack of funding, and the tunnel's cost had increased to $80 million. As the Midtown Tunnel plan faltered, the Board of Estimate approved the construction of other projects that had not been as extensively studied.

=== Plans revived ===
In May 1935, Governor Herbert H. Lehman signed a bill that authorized the creation of the Queens–Midtown Tunnel Authority to construct the tunnel. Mayor Fiorello H. La Guardia subsequently nominated three prominent businessmen to head the agency. La Guardia supported the immediate construction of the tunnel because he believed it would help traffic get from Manhattan to the 1939 New York World's Fair in Queens. The Queens–Midtown Tunnel Authority applied for a federal loan and grant, worth a combined $58.4 million, from the Public Works Administration (PWA) that September. Two months later, the Reconstruction Finance Corporation (RFC) offered to lend $47.1 million of the tunnel's cost if the PWA granted the remaining $11.3 million balance. In response to the RFC's offer, PWA chairman Harold L. Ickes stated that his agency had $32.7 million readily available for the construction of the tunnel. The tunnel's projected $58.4 million cost only applied to the 3,790-foot (1,160 m) section of the tunnel under the river, as well as the 1,600-foot (490 m) Queens approach and the 2,400-foot (730 m) Manhattan approach east of Second Avenue. The Brooklyn spur had been canceled for the time being because it could not be funded independently, while the crosstown highway was to be included in a later project. Civic groups continued to advocate for the canceled Brooklyn spur even after construction started.

The federal government tentatively allocated $58.3 million for the tunnel's construction in January 1936. The allotment was composed of the RFC loan and PWA grant, and it was expected to be paid off by revenue from tolls and bonds. The same month, the New York State Legislature organized the New York City Tunnel Authority to construct the Queens–Midtown and Brooklyn–Battery Tunnels. Work on the Queens–Midtown Tunnel could start as soon as the city received the federal funds. The Tunnel Authority accepted the grant in March 1936, and the Queens–Midtown Tunnel became the United States' largest public works project that was not supervised by a federal agency.

In April 1936, Manhattan borough president Samuel Levy suggested that a six-lane bridge should be built instead, since a bridge would save an estimated $36 million compared to the tunnel. This plan was endorsed by Brooklyn borough president Raymond V. Ingersoll and State Senator Thomas C. Desmond. Robert Moses, the chairman of the Triborough Bridge Authority (TBA), also supported a bridge, but for a separate reason: he held a grudge against the Tunnel Authority because he had been rejected from running the authority. Moses's agency would be the only entity who could construct and operate a toll bridge entirely within the New York City limits, and the already-approved federal funding for the tunnel would be canceled if the project was delayed too long. New York City Tunnel Authority commissioner William Friedman, Mayor LaGuardia, and the Queens Borough Chamber of Commerce opposed a bridge, since the funding for the tunnel had already been secured. In spite of the bridge dispute, the PWA ordered that tunnel planning work proceed. A bill for the proposed bridge was voted down in the New York State Senate that May.

=== Construction ===
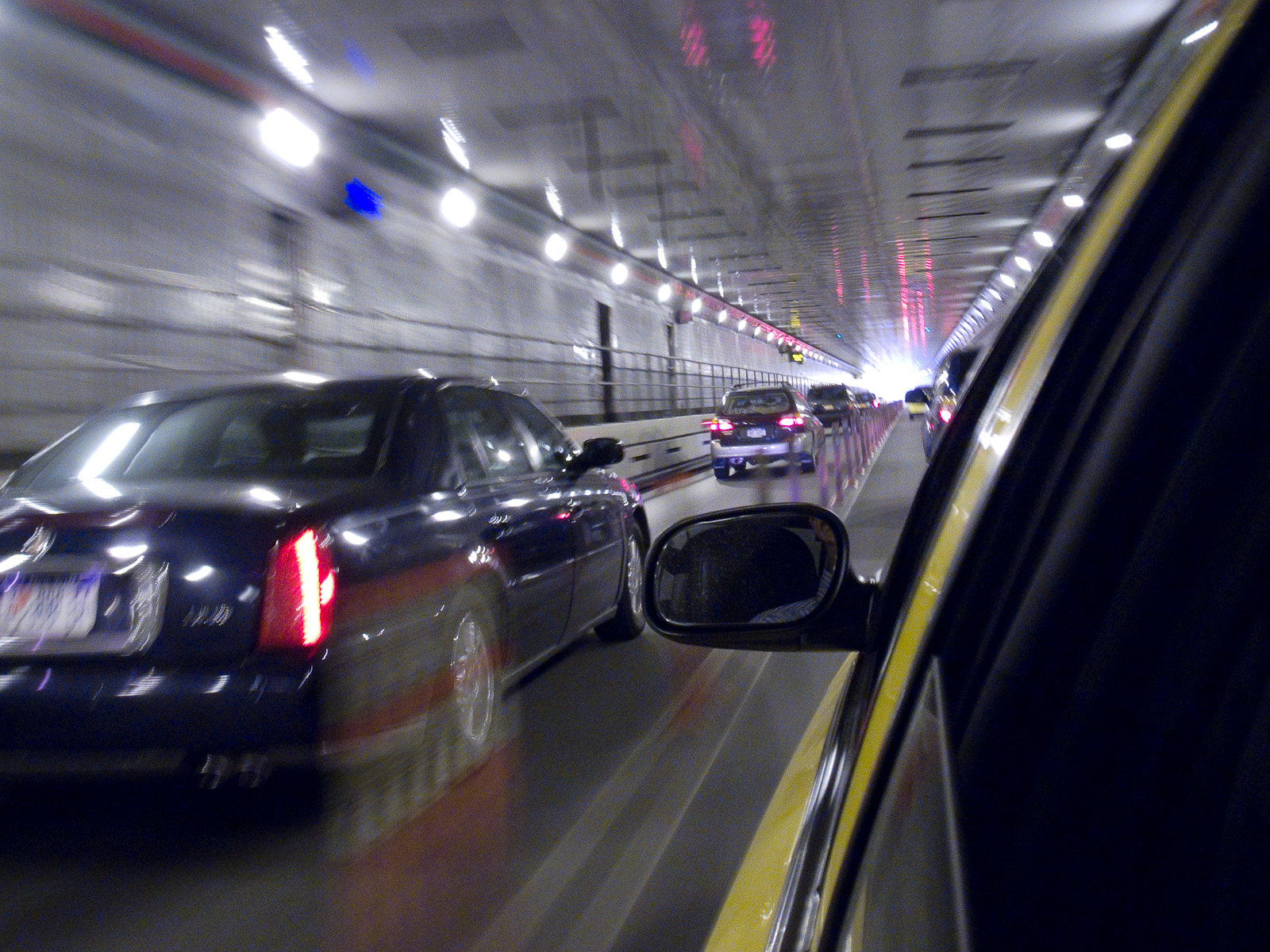
View inside the tunnel

The Tunnel Authority approved plans for the Queens–Midtown Tunnel in August 1936, and the Authority's chief engineer, Ole Singstad, was tasked with the project's design. By the end of the month, the first bids for the tunnel were advertised. A groundbreaking ceremony for the tunnel was held on the Queens side on October 1, 1936, with President Franklin D. Roosevelt in attendance. Shortly afterward, the New York City Tunnel Authority awarded the first contracts for the tunnel's construction. Test bores for the tubes were started later that month. These exploratory bores utilized diamond-tipped drills operated from flat-bottomed boats, which drilled downward into the riverbed.

After the test bores were completed in November 1936, engineers determined that there were many geological and manmade obstacles to constructing the tunnel. First, the Queens–Midtown Tunnel's path passed through a large concentration of solid rock, although there were also some pockets of dirt under the river that would be easy to dig through. Additionally, sandhogs digging the Queens–Midtown Tunnel would have to avoid accidental damage to the East River railroad tunnels to the south and the Steinway Tunnel to the north. Of the four shafts that were being constructed for the tunnel, only the Queens construction shaft had been completed. The next month, the Tunnel Authority had accepted a bid for the Midtown ventilation shaft, and it had been authorized to begin the shaft's construction immediately. Construction on the Manhattan ventilation shaft began with a ceremony on December 31, 1936, and four months later, the city bought the entire city block surrounding the shaft was located.

The first $500,000 allocation of PWA funding was released in January 1937. A 40-foot-deep (12 m) layer of clay was placed at the bottom of the East River, atop the tunnel's path, to prevent air leakages and to maintain air pressure within the tubes. This "blanket" contained about 250,000 cubic yards (190,000 m^{3}) of clay. This was the first time a clay blanket was used on an underwater tunnel project, so digging work was delayed for four months to allow the clay layer to be placed. Officials feared that the tunnel might not open before the end of 1940, as was originally planned. A contract for digging the tubes themselves was awarded in June 1937. The project employed as many as 2,500 sandhogs at a time. Because the work site had such a high air pressure, each man worked two 30-minute shifts per day, punctuated by a 6-hour break in a depressurized chamber so that they would not get decompression sickness.

On the Queens side, it was proposed to link the tunnel to what is now I-495. Eventually, officials agreed to construct the 2.5-mile (4.0 km) link to what is now the Brooklyn-Queens Expressway, forming part of a longer highway that connected directly to LaGuardia Airport. The status of a corresponding limited-access expressway on the Manhattan side, connecting to the Lincoln Tunnel, was still undecided. The Manhattan entrance and exit ramps eliminated the St. Gabriel Church, which was later replaced by construction of the Church of Our Saviour on Park Avenue. By early 1938, costs were rising quickly, and only 65% of the contracts had been awarded. Tunnel Authority Commissioner Friedman stated that if costs were to keep increasing at the same rate, construction might have to be abandoned midway through. By September 1938, three-fourths of the tunnel's contracts had been awarded.

Work on the underwater section of the tubes started in April 1938. Underwater boring was supposed to have started earlier but the geology of the underwater section had delayed construction. When the underwater digging started, La Guardia opened the valves that allowed compressed air to flow into the tubes, and workers started digging the tunnels under the river from each end. The pressurized air allowed sandhogs to work as much as six hours per day in two 3-hour shifts, but as they tunneled nearer to the center of the river, the pressure increased and sandhogs worked fewer hours per day. Builders also pumped air along the top of the tunnel to prevent water from seeping in. Later, workers began wearing oxygen masks connected to a portable machine that gave out pure oxygen. Despite the precautions taken to avoid sudden depressurization of the tubes, about 300 cases of decompression sickness were recorded during the construction process.

The project was about 25% completed by September 1938. Workers primarily dug underwater using tunnelling shields that drilled inward from both portals of each tube, but used dynamite to blast through thick sheets of rock. Afterward, steel rings, each composed of 14 sections which individually weighed up to 3,500 pounds (1,600 kg), were laid within the tunnel. In March 1939, the PWA released a report predicting that the tunnel would not be complete until summer 1941, eight months later than originally planned, due to geological difficulties. Around the same time, Robert Moses alleged that the Queens–Midtown Tunnel would not be profitable, during an unrelated argument about the feasibility of building the Brooklyn–Battery Tunnel. This prompted the New York State Legislature to conduct an investigation into the Queens–Midtown Tunnel's costs. Moses's allegation also originated from his resentment toward the Tunnel Authority.

Work proceeded quickly afterward, and the tunnel was 60% complete by May 1939. Construction was briefly halted in July when sandhogs went on strike for two weeks due to a disagreement between two unions. By that time, the two segments of the tubes were only separated by 850 feet (260 m). Workers digging from the Manhattan side no longer required compressed air because the tubes had reached a rock cropping. The sandhogs sped up their pace of digging, and by late September, the project was 45 days ahead of schedule.

The disjointed segments of both tubes were connected with a "holing through" ceremony in November 1939, with a margin of error of less than 0.5 inches (13 mm). In January 1940, another construction milestone was reached when the last of 1,622 metal rings were installed in the tubes. The fans were being installed in the ventilation buildings, and property at the Queens portal was being demolished to make way for the tunnel approaches. By May 1940, only three contracts remained to be awarded, and the tunnel was 90% complete.

=== Opening and early years ===
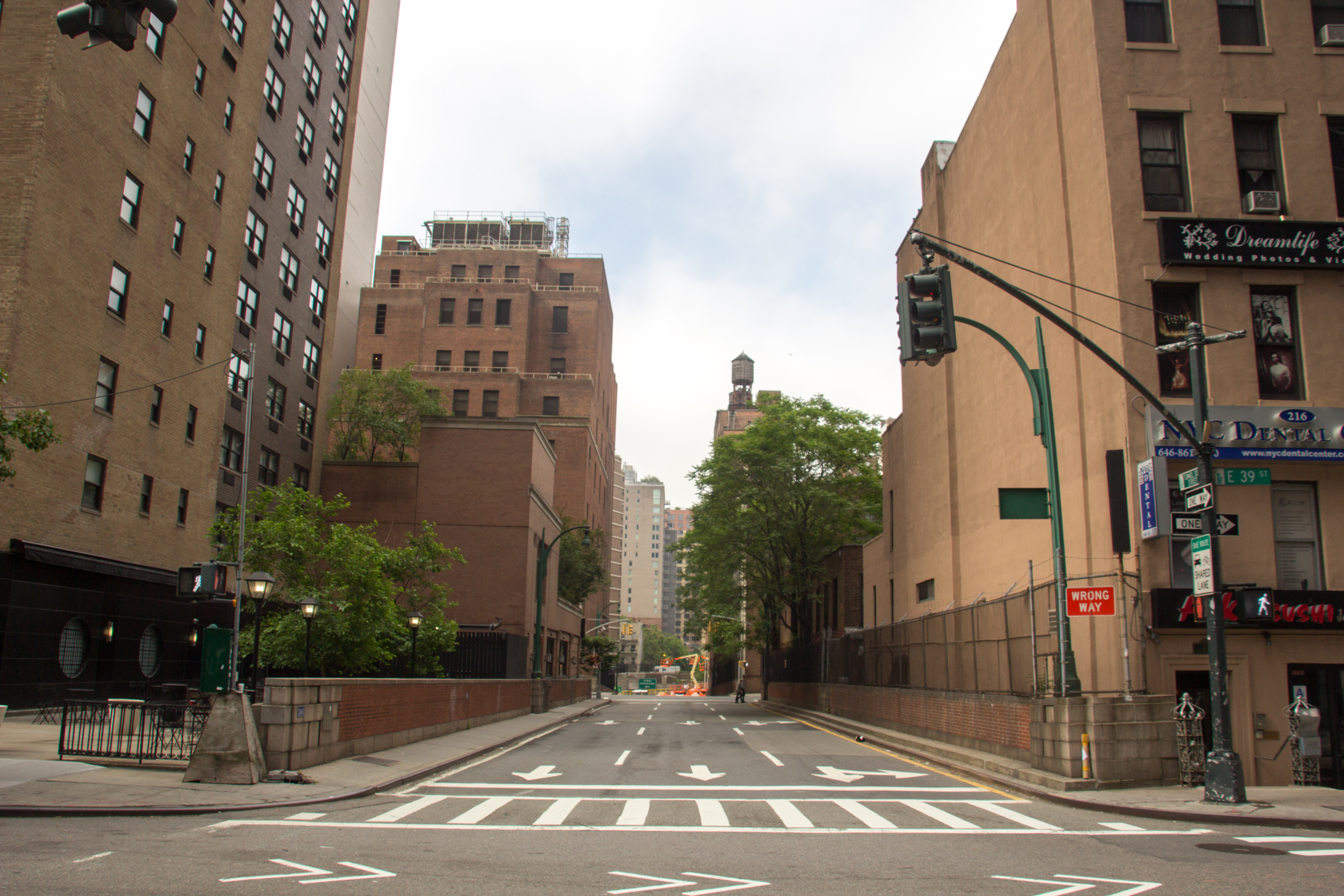
The exit ramp in Manhattan

The Queens–Midtown Tunnel finished on schedule in late 1940. President Franklin D. Roosevelt was the first person to drive through the tunnel, on October 28, 1940. The general public could not use it until mid-November. An advertisement for the tunnel, published in newspapers just before its opening, touted it as "the toll that isn't a toll" with the slogan "Cross In 3 Minutes, Save In 3 Ways ... Time! Money! Gas!" The Queens Chamber of Commerce's president praised the Queens–Midtown Tunnel as something that would spur development in Queens.

The tunnel was opened to the general public on November 15, 1940, at a ceremony on the Queens side. The attendees included the Queens and Manhattan borough presidents; U.S. Senator Robert F. Wagner; and New York City Council president Newbold Morris, who was attending in La Guardia's stead. The tubes were fitted with a then-new lighting technology that allowed drivers to more quickly adjust to the sunlight upon leaving the tunnel. One hundred and fifty workers were hired and trained to operate the tunnel. The first paying customer was Henry Sokovit of Queens.

In a report published in August 1939, the New York City Tunnel Authority had estimated that the tunnel would carry 10 million vehicles in its first year and would reach its 16-million annual-vehicle capacity by 1952. Against expectation, traffic counts in the first few months were lower than expected because motorists could use the East River bridges to the north and south for free. The tunnel had carried one million vehicles by February 1941, three months after opening. This was further exacerbated by the gasoline rationing during World War II, which caused vehicular trips in general to decline. The tunnel was closed during the nighttime beginning in February 1943, but due to growing nighttime traffic demand, 24-hour operation resumed in July 1944. By 1946, the tunnel was running a $5.8 million deficit. The Triborough Bridge and Tunnel Authority, the successor to the New York City Tunnel Authority, recorded a 72% increase in tunnel traffic in the first half of that year compared to the same time frame in 1945. The tunnel recorded its first profits in 1949, with a net earning of $659,505. As part of an experiment to alleviate traffic congestion, in December 1955, one of the eastbound tube's lanes began carrying westbound traffic during morning rush hours.

In 1950, the TBTA and several airlines agreed to build the East Side Airlines Terminal at First Avenue between 37th and 38th Streets, on the Manhattan side of the tunnel. When the terminal opened in 1953, it accommodated bus routes that ran to either LaGuardia or John F. Kennedy International Airports. The terminal operated until 1984, and it was sold in 1985. This site is now occupied by The Corinthian, an apartment complex.

=== Mid-Manhattan Expressway and third tube plan ===
A connector between the Queens–Midtown and Lincoln Tunnels was again proposed in 1950, but was dropped for lack of support. Nine years later, Robert Moses proposed adding a third tube to the Queens–Midtown Tunnel to relieve congestion, with a possible extension to Brooklyn. The tube would be located to the south of the two existing tubes. In January 1965, Moses announced that money had been allocated to a feasibility study for the third tube, which was projected to cost $120 million. This proposal was part of his plan to build a Mid-Manhattan expressway over 30th Street. The third tube was to connect to the ultimately unbuilt Bushwick Expressway, which would have run across northeastern Brooklyn and southwestern Queens before intersecting with the present-day Nassau Expressway.

In December 1965, Moses canceled his plans for the Mid-Manhattan Expressway due to opposition from the city government. He affirmed that the TBTA would construct a third tube for the Queens–Midtown Tunnel because it did not require the city's approval, and he stated that the new tube could be completed four-and-a-half years after construction started. According to Moses, after the third tube was completed, two tubes would be dedicated exclusively to westbound and eastbound traffic, while the center tube would become a reversible-flow roadway. The Queens Chamber of Commerce supported the third-tube project, but citywide officials opposed it. Moses ignored the city's disapproval and, in March 1966, advertised for bids to make test borings for the third tube. The TBTA continued studying the feasibility of a third tube through 1967, but ultimately, a third tube was never built.

=== Later years ===
In 1971, one lane of the Queens–Midtown Tunnel's eastbound tube was converted to a westbound high-occupancy vehicle (HOV) and bus lane during the morning rush hour. The reversible tunnel lane was fed by a HOV/bus lane along I-495, which started 2 miles (3.2 km) east of the tunnel's Queens portal.

Each spring from 1981 to 2016, the tunnel was closed to traffic for a few hours overnight to accommodate the annual "Ringling Bros. and Barnum & Bailey Circus Animal Walk". Several nights before the circus opened at Madison Square Garden, the elephants marched into Manhattan and down 34th Street to the arena. The animals had formerly been transported into the city via the West Side railroad line in Manhattan, but the southernmost part of that line, the High Line viaduct, was closed in 1981 during construction of the Javits Center. The first "Animal Walk" through the Queens–Midtown Tunnel memorialized a similar event ten years earlier, when the animals had walked to Manhattan through the Lincoln Tunnel due to a railroad strike. The walk became an annual tradition, and crowds of several hundred people would gather at the Queens–Midtown Tunnel's Queens portal to see the march in the middle of the night. Even so, the march was controversial and attracted protests from organizations who opposed what they saw as the inhumane treatment of the circus animals. When the circus stopped using elephants in 2016, the elephant walk ceased.

Under an agreement with Verizon Wireless, the Queens–Midtown Tunnel received cellular service in 1995. The tubes' roadways were originally paved with bricks, but the road surface was replaced with asphalt in 1995. Two years later, the TBTA's successor, MTA Bridges and Tunnels, announced its intention to renovate the roof of the Queens–Midtown Tunnel. The $132 million project, completed in May 2001, involved replacing the roof with 930 slabs of concrete that were suspended from brackets glued onto the tunnel shell. The major contract for the renovation project, worth $97 million, received scrutiny when it was discovered that the contractor had given money to the political party of Governor George Pataki just before the contract was awarded. A state judge found that the MTA did not break any laws or ethical obligations when it awarded the contract to the Pataki donor instead of another competitor. The MTA started replacing the 23 fans within the tunnel's ventilation structures, in 2004 and the fan-replacement project was completed in 2008.

For a short time after the September 11 attacks in 2001, all Manhattan-bound traffic through the tunnel was subject to a high-occupancy vehicle restriction. This restriction was removed in April 2002.

In 2017–2018, the tiled walls in the Queens–Midtown and Brooklyn–Battery Tunnels were replaced due to damage suffered during Hurricane Sandy in 2012. The re-tiled white walls have gold-and-blue stripes, representing the official state colors of New York. There was a controversy over the re-tiling of the tunnels, which cost a combined $30 million, because of the ongoing transit crisis at the time.

On September 4, 2024, a contractor conducting surveys for the East River Greenway accidentally drilled through the roof of one of the tubes, causing water to leak into the tunnel, and forcing it to be closed for emergency repairs. It was re-opened several hours later, after a temporary plug was put in place. Contractors later permanently fixed the leak by fitting a steel cap over that plug.

== Bus routes ==
The tunnel carries 21 express bus routes; sixteen of these routes use the tunnel for westbound travel only. The bus routes that use the tunnel are the BM5, QM1, QM2, QM4, QM5, QM6, QM7, QM8, QM10, QM11, QM12, QM15, QM16, QM17, QM18, QM24 and QM25, all operated by the MTA Bus Company, and the QM63, QM64 and QM68, operated by MTA New York City Transit. All of these routes except the BM5, QM7, QM8, QM8 Super Express (SX), QM11, QM25, QM2 SX, QM5 SX, and QM20 SX use the tunnel for westbound travel only, as most of the routes use the Queensboro Bridge for eastbound travel.

== Tolls ==
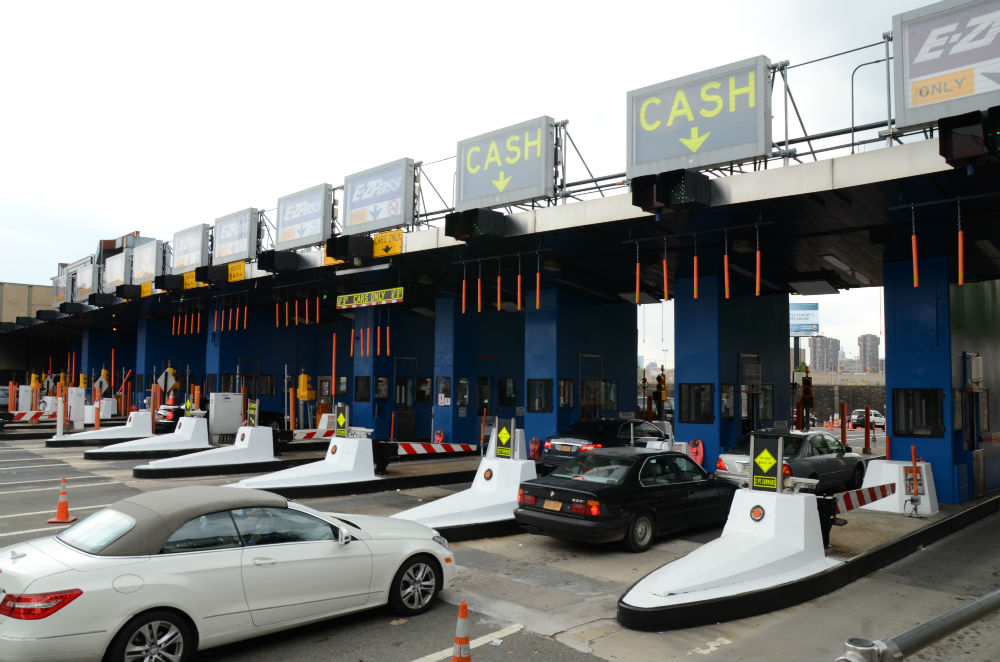
Former toll plaza on the Queens side in Long Island City, prior to the replacement of cashless tolling

As of January 4, 2026, drivers pay $12.03 per car or $5.06 per motorcycle for tolls by mail and vehicles with out-of-state E-ZPasses. E-ZPass users with transponders issued by the New York E‑ZPass Customer Service Center pay $7.46 per car or $3.25 per motorcycle. Mid-Tier NYCSC E-ZPass users pay $9.79 per car or $4.18 per motorcycle.

Open-road cashless tolling started on January 10, 2017. The tollbooths were demolished, and replaced by cameras and E-ZPass readers mounted to overhead gantries manufactured by TransCore located at the Manhattan end of the tunnel. A vehicle without E-ZPass has a picture taken of its license plate and a bill for the toll is mailed to its owner. For E-ZPass users, sensors detect their transponders wirelessly.

=== Historical tolls ===
Historical passenger tolls for the Queens–Midtown Tunnel (Note: This table lists the peak tolls for two-axle vehicles. Motorcycle tolls and off-peak tolls are lower, and tolls for vehicles with additional axles are higher.)
Years	Toll		Toll equivalent in 2025		Ref.
Years	Cash	E-ZPass	Cash	E-ZPass	Ref.
1940–1972	$0.25	—N/a	$1.92–5.75	—N/a	
1972–1975	$0.50	—N/a	$2.99–3.85	—N/a	
1975–1980	$0.75	—N/a	$2.93–4.49	—N/a	
1980–1982	$1.00	—N/a	$3.34–3.91	—N/a	
1982–1984	$1.25	—N/a	$3.87–4.17	—N/a	
1984–1986	$1.50	—N/a	$4.49–4.41	—N/a	
1986–1987	$1.75	—N/a	$4.96–5.14	—N/a	
1987–1989	$2.00	—N/a	$5.19–5.67	—N/a	
1989–1993	$2.50	—N/a	$5.57–6.49	—N/a	
1993–1996	$3.00	—N/a	$6.16–6.69	—N/a	
1996–2003	$3.50	$3.50	$6.13–7.18	$6.13–7.18	
2003–2005	$4.00	$4.00	$6.59–7.00	$6.59–7.00	
2005–2008	$4.50	$4.00	$6.73–7.42	$5.98–6.59	
2008–2010	$5.00	$4.15	$7.38–7.48	$6.13–6.21	
2010–2015	$6.50	$4.80	$8.83–9.60	$6.52–7.09	
2015–2017	$8.00	$5.54	$10.51–10.87	$7.28–7.52	
2017–2019	$8.50	$5.76	$10.70–11.16	$7.25–7.57	
2019–2021	$9.50	$6.12	$11.29–11.96	$7.27–7.71	
2021–2023	$10.17	$6.55	$10.75–12.08	$6.92–7.78	
2023–2026	$11.19	$6.94	$11.19–11.82	$6.94–7.33	
2026–present	$12.03	$7.46	$12.03	$7.46	

=== Congestion toll ===
Congestion pricing in New York City was implemented in January 2025; drivers who enter Manhattan via the tunnel pay a second toll. The congestion charges are collected via E-ZPass and tolls-by-mail. The charges vary based on time of day and vehicle class, but the congestion toll is charged once per day. Drivers who use the Queens–Midtown Tunnel to enter the congestion zone receive a $1.50 credit toward the congestion charge during the day, and pay a discounted toll at night.
