= Church of the Holy Family (Manhattan) =

Church building in Manhattan, United States of America

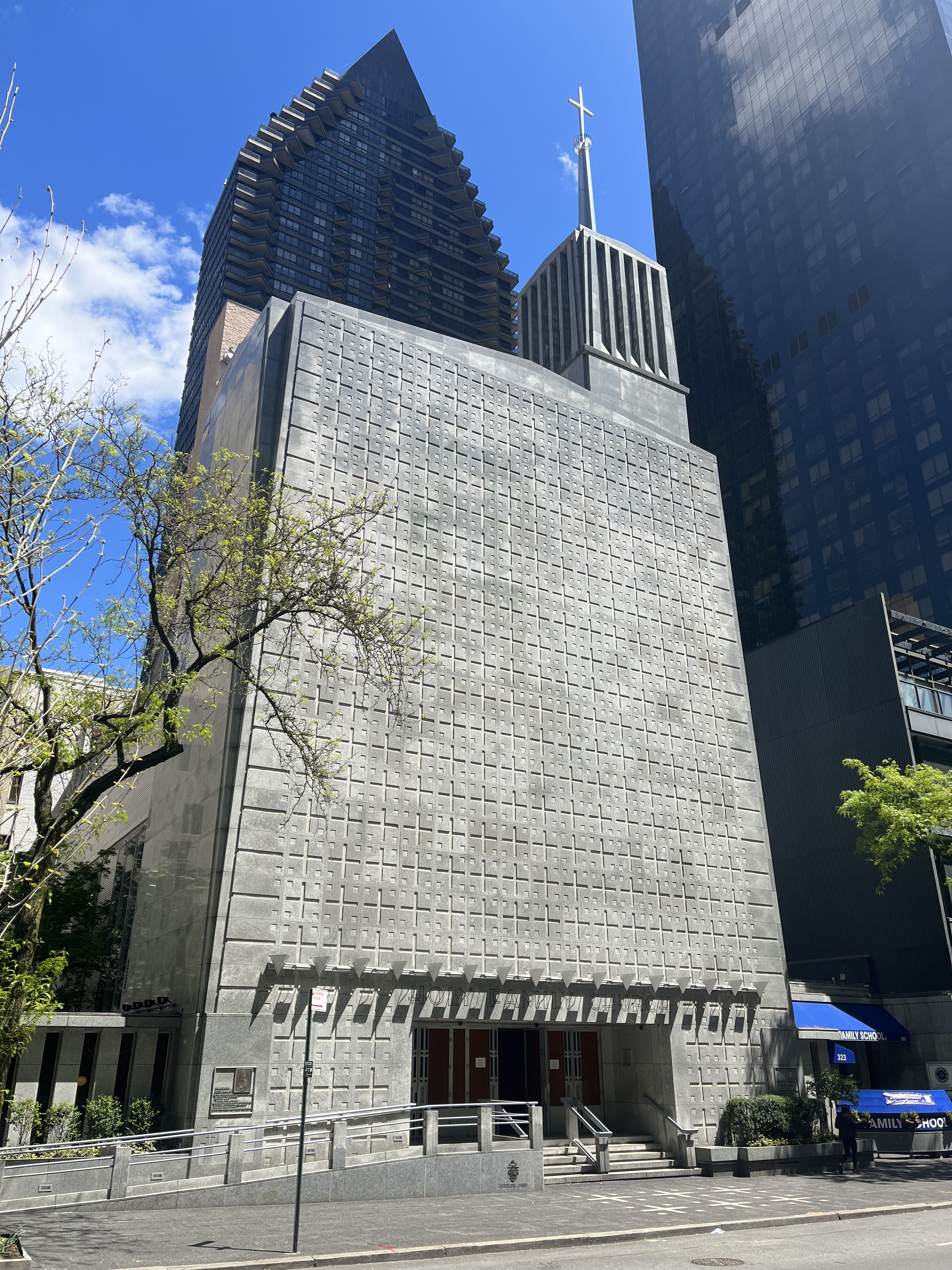
- Church of the Holy Family in 2023
- Church of the Holy Family
- 40°45′10″N 73°58′7″W
- Address: 315 East 47th Street; Manhattan, New York City
- Country: United States
- Denomination: Roman Catholic
- Website: www.churchholyfamily.org

History
- Founder: Fr. Daniel De Nonno

Architecture
- Architect: George J. Sole (1965)
- Style: Modern
- Completed: church: 1927 renovation: 1965

Administration
- Archdiocese: New York

Clergy
- Pastor: Msgr. Douglas Mathers

The Church of the Holy Family, also known as the United Nations Parish, is a Roman Catholic parish church in the Archdiocese of New York, located at 315 East 47th Street in Manhattan, New York City. Originally established in 1924 for Italian-speaking immigrants, the church has adapted to serve the Turtle Bay neighborhood as well as the community associated with the nearby United Nations. In 1965 it became the first parish church in the Western Hemisphere to be visited by a reigning pope.

== History ==
=== Early 20th century ===
The origins of the church trace back to 1914, when the pastor of St. Boniface Church received permission to open St. Anthony's Chapel in the parish's school hall to provide special masses for Italian-speaking parishioners. In November 1924, Cardinal Patrick Hayes decided to create a separate parish to serve the growing number of Italian immigrants in the area, which amounted to nearly 9,000 members. Property at 315–323 East 47th Street—across the street from St. Boniface's Parochial School—was purchased for a new church. The new parish was headed by Father Daniel De Nonno, a priest at St. Boniface that had been closely involved with St. Anthony's Chapel. On April 16, 1925, a dinner was held at the Biltmore Hotel in honor of Father De Nonno and raised $17,500 towards the construction of the new church. Masses continued to be held at the St. Boniface parish hall until the new edifice was completed. The new church was dedicated in April 1927 and consisted of a brick stucco structure that formerly housed a brewery and a stable.

Soon after the church opened, a group of parishioners employed as chauffeurs and garage workers began a movement to establish a shrine to Saint Christopher, the patron saint of travelers. The shrine was dedicated on January 18, 1931, and included a statue of St. Christopher above a side altar. Father De Nonno also began a tradition of holding a "motorists' mass" on Sunday afternoons to allow chauffeurs to attend after they finished driving passengers to morning worship services. After the mass, the priests would come outside the church in their vestments and bless the automobiles parked on East 47th Street with a reliquary containing a bone of St. Christopher. This practice caught the attention of New York State Governor Franklin D. Roosevelt, who sent Father De Nonno a letter expressing his appreciation in helping to draw awareness to the state's safety campaign to reduce motor vehicle accidents and deaths. The church also became the headquarters of the confraternity of St. Christopher, of which Father De Nonno was the national director.

A group of three paintings portraying the glorification of the Holy Family was dedicated on October 4, 1931, and blessed by Monsignor Michael J. Lavelle, rector of St. Patrick's Cathedral. The works of art, each measuring 25 by 12.5 feet (7.6 by 3.8 m), included a replica of Titian's Assumption of the Virgin and depictions of the Ascension of Christ and Transit of St. Joseph. They were painted directly on the walls of the church under the direction of Ignazio La Russa of the Art Academy of Palermo.

In 1937, Father De Nonno was transferred to St. Anthony's Church in the Wakefield section of the Bronx and the Church of the Holy Family became administered as a branch of St. Boniface, with Rev. George J. Zentgraf serving as the head of both parishes.

=== Late 20th century to present ===
St. Boniface Church, along with its parochial school hall that originally held masses for the Holy Family parish, were demolished in 1950 to create a parkway approach leading to the United Nations along the south side of East 47th Street between First and Second Avenues (now part of Dag Hammarskjöld Plaza). The parishioners of St. Boniface and its pastor, Father Zentgraf, were transferred to the Church of the Holy Family. To accommodate the loss of St. Boniface, the property adjacent to the Church of the Holy Family at 325 East 47th Street was purchased in 1953 to construct a new church to serve the spiritual needs of the Turtle Bay neighborhood as well as the United Nations community. The new church would also complement similar religious centers being developed in the vicinity of the United Nations including the Church Center for the United Nations and the Sutton Place Synagogue.

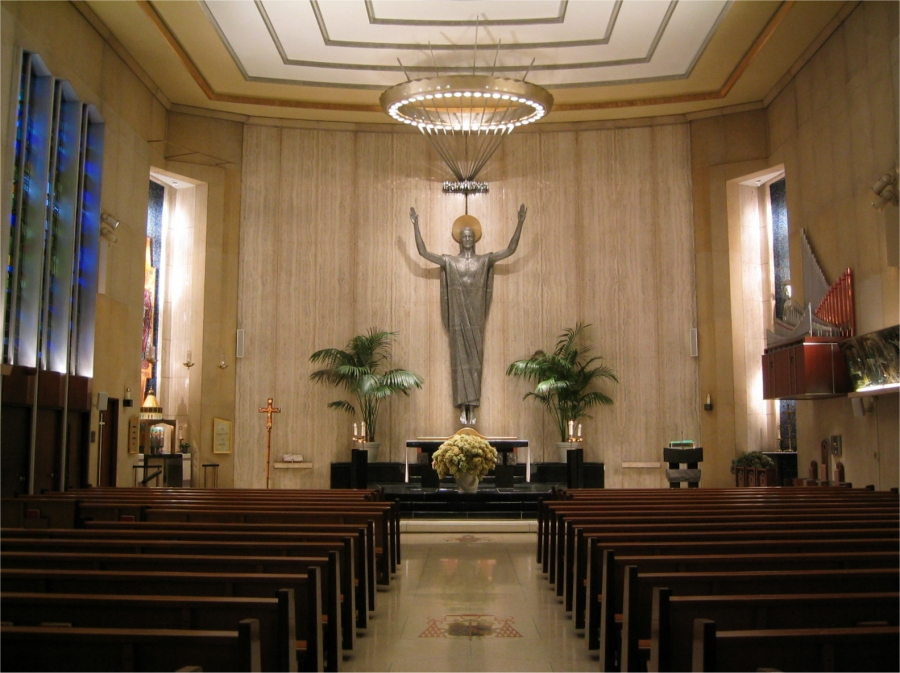
The 1965 renovation was designed by architect George J. Sole

The Church of the Holy Family underwent extensive renovations from 1962 to 1965. Designed by New York architect George J. Sole, the project cost more than $2,225,000 and included a 142-foot (43 m) aluminum bell tower and a large windowless façade made up of granite panels with crosses intended to blend in with the United Nations and other buildings in the surrounding area. The church complex also included a new rectory, an office and residence for the Permanent Observer of the Holy See to the United Nations, and the Pope John XXIII Pacem in Terris multilingual library. Remodeling work to the church included alterations to the structure that had previously served as a brewery and stable, including the removal of two rows of cast-iron columns that ran through the center of the building. The new church was dedicated on March 14, 1965, by Francis Cardinal Spellman.

During the first papal visit to the United States in October 1965, Pope Paul VI held an ecumenical meeting with Protestant, Eastern Orthodox and Jewish representatives at the Church of the Holy Family, which was the first visit by a reigning pope to a parish church in the Western Hemisphere. In 1979, Pope John Paul II also visited the church and extended a blessing after he had addressed the United Nations General Assembly. Both of the papal visits to the parish are marked by plaques outside the church.

In 1975, the office and residence of the Permanent Observer of the Holy See to the United Nations were moved from the church to a townhouse on the Upper East Side that had been donated to the Archdiocese of New York by the heirs of former New York City Mayor Hugh J. Grant. In 1998, the Church of the Holy Family sold unused air rights to Donald Trump for $10 million, who used them along with air rights purchased from the Japan Society and other neighboring properties to develop the Trump World Tower at the east end of the block along First Avenue on the former site of the United Engineering Center.
