= Hans Schmidt (priest) =

German priest convicted of murder

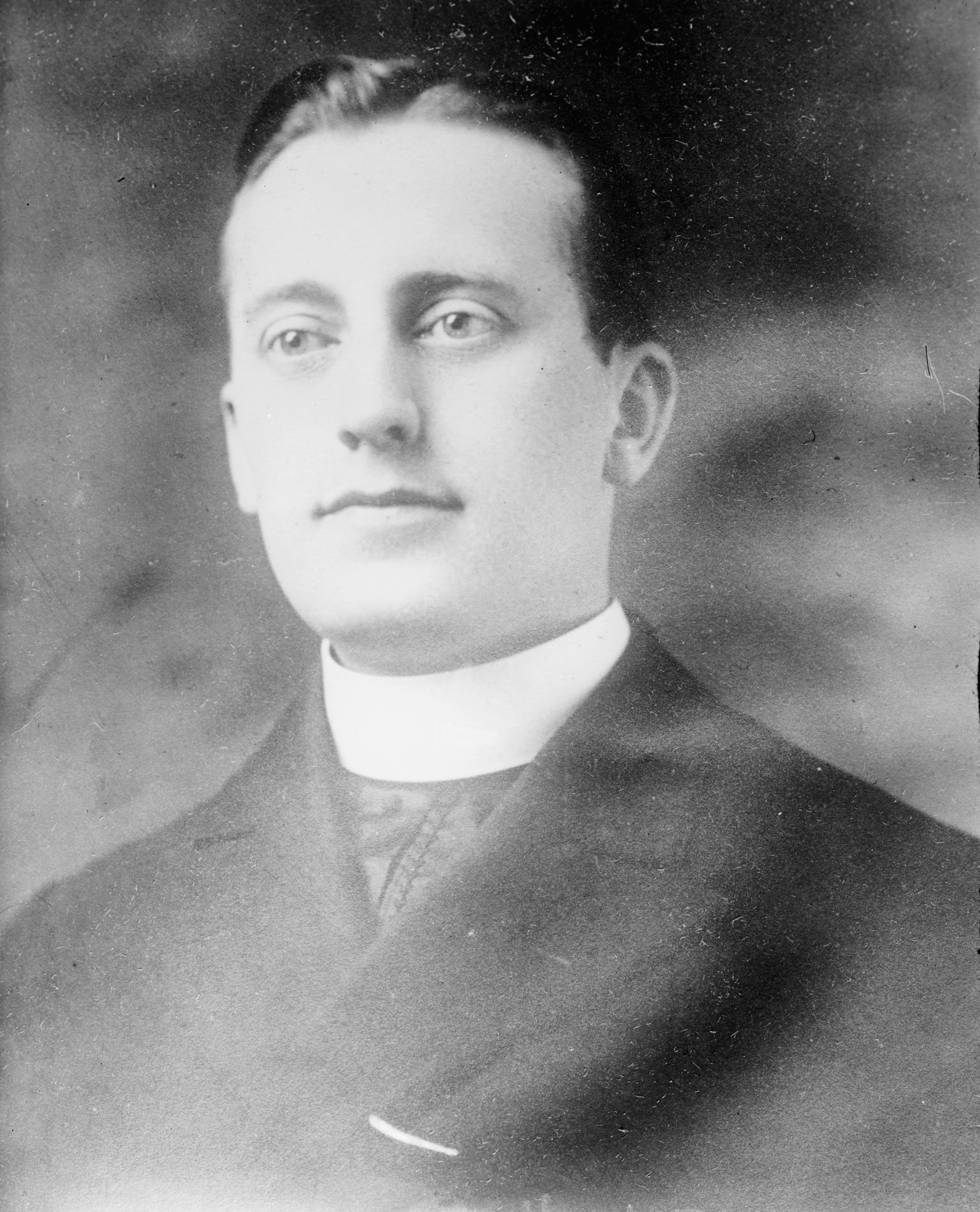
- Born: January 3, 1881; Aschaffenburg, Kingdom of Bavaria, German Empire
- Died: February 18, 1916 (aged 35); Sing Sing Prison, New York, United States
- Resting place: Sing Sing Prison Cemetery, New York, U.S.
- Status: Executed by electrocution
- Conviction: First degree murder
- Penalty: Death

Ecclesiastical career
- Religion: Roman Catholic
- Church: Roman Catholic Church
- Ordained: December 23, 1906 (priest)
- Congregations: St. Mary's Roman Catholic Church, Louisville; St. Boniface's Church, New York City; St. Joseph's Church, New York City

Hans B. Schmidt (3 January 1881 – 18 February 1916) was a German Catholic priest, rapist, convicted murderer, and suspected serial killer. He was executed by way of the electric chair at Sing Sing Prison in New York State for murdering and dismembering a woman in the United States. He was also suspected in the disappearance of another woman and child. Schmidt was the first and remains the only Roman Catholic priest to be executed in the United States.

== Early life ==
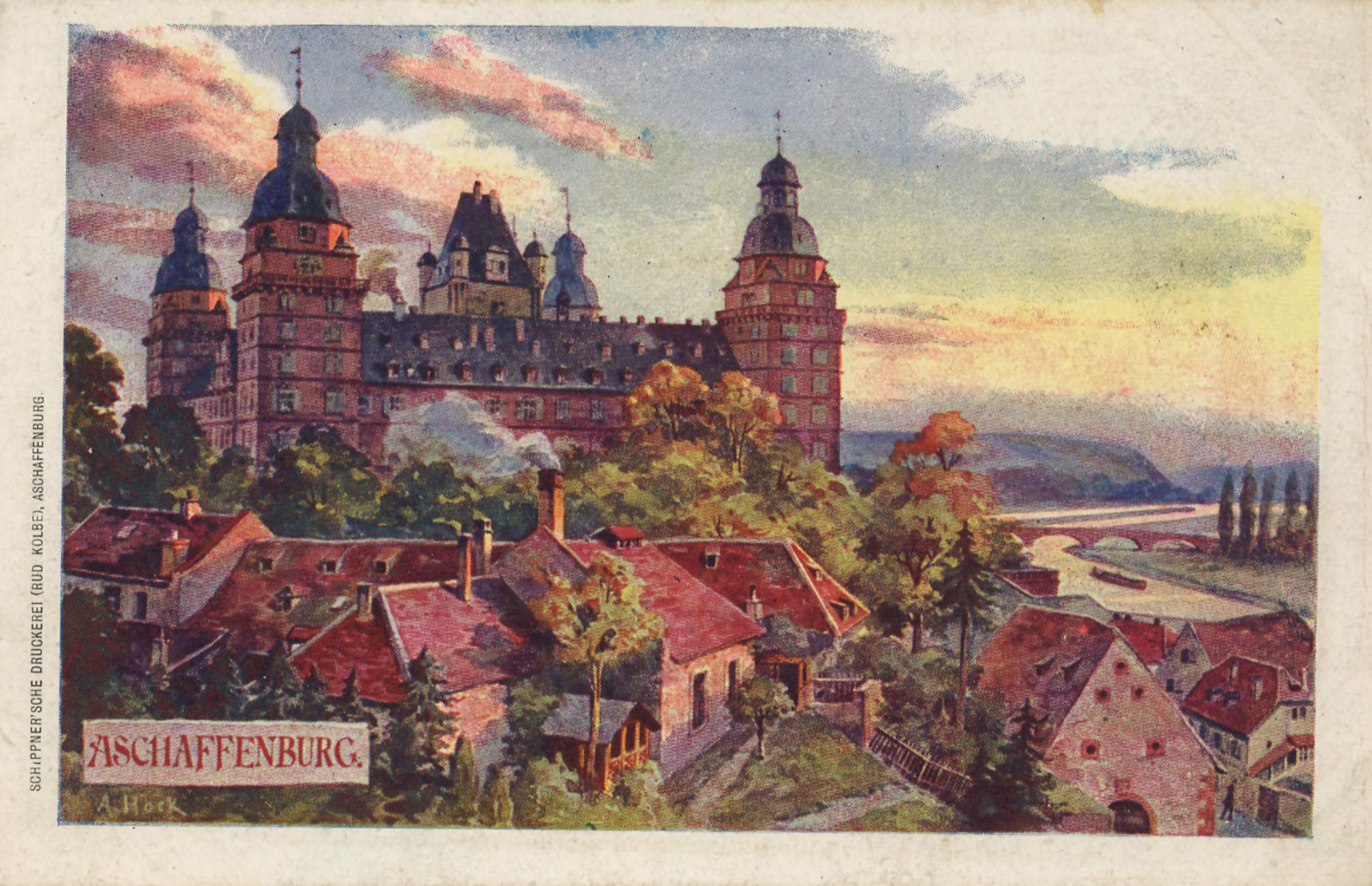
Aschaffenburg, the birthplace of Father Hans Schmidt.

Hans Schmidt was born on January 3, 1881, in the Bavarian town of Aschaffenburg, to a Protestant father and a Catholic mother. Both sides of his family had a long history of mental illness. From his early childhood, Hans was regularly beaten by his father and watched his father beating his mother. Even in childhood, Schmidt combined a fascination with blood with bisexual promiscuity. He was deeply devoted to his mother's Catholic religion and would attend services with her multiple times per day. According to his father, Hans once beheaded two of his parents' geese and kept the severed heads in his pocket. He also frequented the village slaughterhouse daily despite his parent's prohibition. He and several neighbourhood boys would engage in sexual activity at the slaughterhouse while watching the death and dissection of farm animals.

== Ordination ==
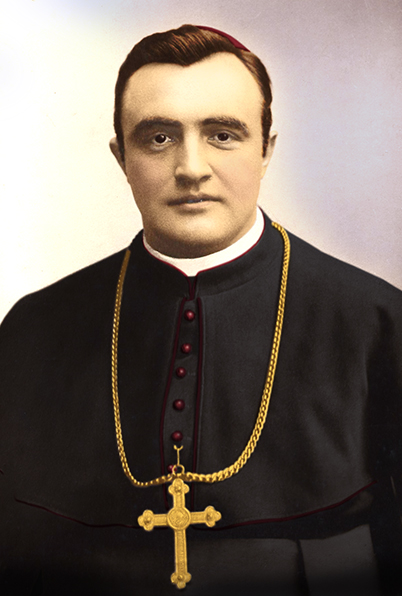
Bishop Georg Heinrich Maria Kirstein, the Roman Catholic bishop who ordained Schmidt to the priesthood in Mainz, Germany, on December 23, 1906.

Hans attended seminary in Mainz from 1901 to 1904 but struggled to follow the rules. He was told repeatedly that if he did not change his behavior he would be asked to leave. When it came time for his class to be ordained, Hans was told that he would not be ordained due to an "unbalanced mind."

From there, Hans went to the Ludwig-Maximilians-Universität München and studied philosophy for approximately one year. Some of the theology faculty at the university were connected to the Seminary at Freising, Germany, and he lived there for a while. This made him want to be a priest even more so he decided to forge a Doctorate of Philosophy for himself while "channeling" the appropriate faculty. He had the official school seals created so the document looked legitimate. He took this document back to Bishop Kirstein at the Seminary in Mainz in 1906 to show him he had done well for himself since leaving in 1904. He was able to convince Bishop Kirstein to ordain him.

Schmidt was ordained by Bishop Kirstein of Mainz on December 23, 1906. In a later conversation with Manhattan psychiatrists, he recalled "The Bishop ordained me alone. I do not like to speak of it. The real Ordination took place the night before. St. Elizabeth, she ordained me herself. I was praying at my bedside when she appeared to me and said, 'I ordain you to the priesthood.' There was light during her appearance. I told no one. I thought it best to keep it to myself. They would make fun of me. They always made fun of me for these things. They always expect others to do as they do. God speaks to different people in different ways."

Schmidt's first position was as an assistant priest at Darmstadt at the Church of St. Elizabeth but he was transferred after only a few months. During parish assignments in the villages of Bürgel and Seelingstädt, Schmidt molested choir boys, had affairs with several women, and consorted with prostitutes. While in Seelingstädt he developed a severe case of Rheumatism which spread throughout his entire body, even affecting his heart, and he had to leave his assignment as a priest to return to the home of his parents for care. He remained in bed for 9 months. Upon his recovery he was assigned to a church in Gonsenheim where he was teaching Christian education to young girls.

Schmidt left Gonsenheim abruptly and wound up arrested for fraud in Munich in 1908. German courts found Schmidt to be insane in 1909 and he was officially defrocked by the Catholic church. His father suggested he go to America, which Schmidt thought was a good idea. He forged paperwork to make it look as though he was still a priest in good standing and set sail in July 1909.

After arriving, he was first assigned to St. Mary's Roman Catholic Church in Louisville, Kentucky. There, a rift with the senior pastor resulted in Schmidt's transfer to St. Francis Church in Trenton, New Jersey. Hans couldn't get along with the bishop or the other priests there either and another transfer took him to St. Boniface's Church in New York City in December 1910.

== Early arrest ==
Schmidt left his assignment in Gonsenheim abruptly in October 1908 without permission and without notification. He was later arrested in Munich under the alias of Rudolph Baum for attempted fraud of college students. He later explained that he absconded because his cousin, Adolph Miller, had shown up to Gonsenheim and was blackmailing him for an inheritance after the death of their uncle, Leo Miller.

He believed himself to be telepathic and planned to use "thought transference" to put his knowledge into the minds of students while they took certification exams. He also planned to forge their diplomas while "channeling" the appropriate faculty. He believed that these would not be forgeries if he was "at one with the souls of the faculty" at the time that he signed their names. He sent letters to over 200 students to advertise this service using the name "Dr. Zantos." He was arrested before any students fell for the scheme, and it was then discovered that he had forged his own Doctorate of Philosophy in 1906.

Psychiatrists examined Schmidt in jail and came to the conclusion that he was insane and therefore not criminally responsible for his crimes. The German courts found that he was not a danger to society and therefore did not sentence him to an asylum, however when they released him to his father's custody they told his father that he should commit him to an asylum. His father instead checked him into a vacation spa at Jordanbad where Schmidt stayed for only a few weeks.

The Catholic officials in Germany decided to defrock him.

== Anna Aumüller ==
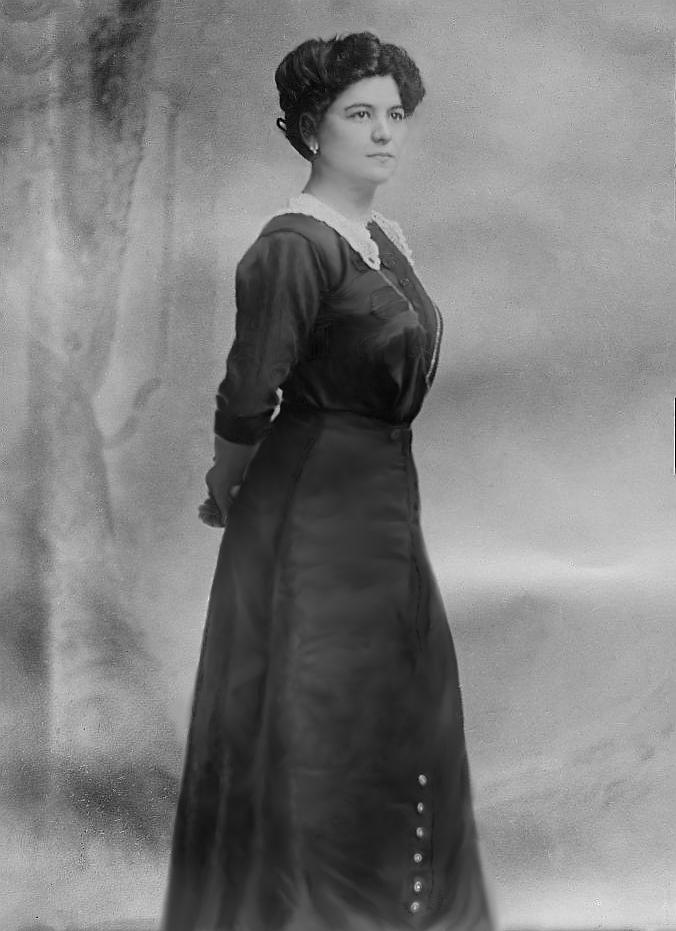
Anna Aumüller

In New York City, Schmidt met 17-year-old Anna Aumüller, a housekeeper at the Rectory of St. Boniface Church, who had emigrated from the Austro-Hungarian Empire on December 1, 1910. Anna had begun working there just 3 days before Schmidt arrived. Schmidt collapsed in a hallway when he first saw Aumüller and she helped him get to his bed. He told her he loved her and within 3 days their relationship had become sexual. Schmidt was 29.

Beginning in December 1912, Schmidt was also having a secret homosexual relationship with a New York City dentist named Ernest Muret, with whom he operated a counterfeiting ring. Schmidt later claimed to have enjoyed the relationship with Muret more than that of Aumüller.

Despite his subsequent transfer to St. Joseph's Church in Harlem, Schmidt and Aumüller continued a secret sexual relationship. It was later revealed that they were "married" in a secret ceremony, which Schmidt performed himself. Schmidt and Aumüller had paid the fee for a marriage license in the spring of 1913 but did not have a legal ceremony. However, Schmidt wrote their names on a marriage certificate and told Aumüller that he was about to leave the priesthood for her.

While celebrating mass at St. Joseph's Church in the spring of 1913, Schmidt received what he claimed was a command from God to "sacrifice" Anna. He claimed he heard the voice of God above the chalice say to him, "Anna shall be a sacrifice of love and atonement." The command was repeated so insistently that Schmidt told Aumüller, who called him "crazy". Soon after, Aumüller informed him that she was pregnant.

On the night of September 2, 1913, Schmidt went to the apartment they had rented while posing as a married couple. He slashed Aumüller's throat while she slept, drank her blood, raped her as she bled to death, dismembered her body, and threw the pieces from a ferry into the Hudson River. Schmidt then returned to St. Joseph's Church, offered Mass and administered Holy Communion as though nothing had happened.

Only 3 pieces of Aumüller's body were ever located; her upper torso, her lower torso, and her right thigh. The pieces of her torso contained all of her internal organs aside from her pancreas. Her uterus did not contain a fetus and coroners testified that she had had a natural birth within 3 days of her murder. There was no sign that any surgical tools had been used to induce any sort of labor or abortion. The size of her uterus suggested she was 6 to 7 months pregnant at the time that she gave birth. Among Aumüller's belongings were baby clothes that she had been making by hand.

== Police investigation ==
After pieces of Aumüller's torso washed ashore at Cliffside Park and Weehawken, New Jersey, Hudson County police detectives found a price tag still attached to the pillowcase used to wrap part of the body. Using the tag, the pillowcase was traced to a factory in Newark, New Jersey, which sold exclusively to Manhattan furniture dealer George Sachs. The investigation was then taken over by the New York City Police Department and assigned to Manhattan Chief of Detectives Joseph Faurot.

After arriving at George Sachs' furniture store at 2782 Eighth Avenue, Inspector Faurot found the dealer had purchased 12 of these pillows and had sold only 2 of them. A check through his receipts revealed that a bedspring, a mattress, pillows, and pillowcases had been sold on August 26, 1913. The buyer had given his name as H. Schmidt and had arranged for his purchases to be delivered to a third story apartment at 68 Bradhurst Avenue.

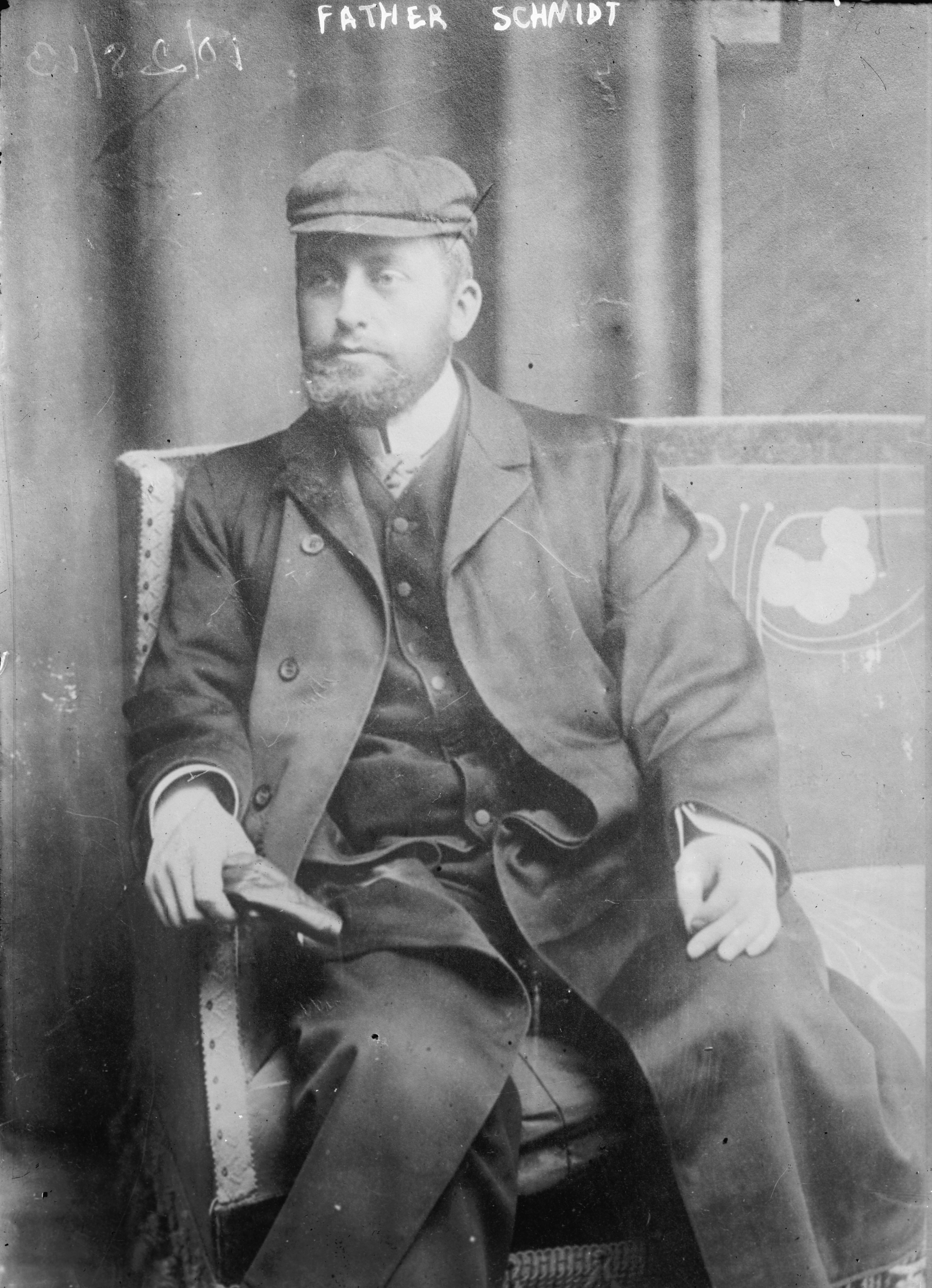
Schmidt recovering from rheumatism in 1908

Questions to the building superintendent revealed that the apartment was occupied by a married couple. The husband was described as a man with a heavy German accent who had given his name as H. Schmidt. When a three-day stake out revealed no one arriving, Inspector Faurot ordered detective Frank Cassassa to break into the apartment. A cursory search found that the floor had been recently scrubbed, but large amounts of dried blood were found on the walls. A large knife and saw were found inside of a trunk in the apartment. Men's clothing with the name A. Van Dyke sewn into the lining was found, as were letters in both German and English addressed to an Anna Aumüller at the St. Boniface's Church address.

Inspector Faurot and detectives Cassassa and O'Connell visited the address and were told by the senior pastor, Father John Braun, Aumüller had moved out on August 30. Father Braun told the detectives that she had a cousin, Joseph Igler, who lived not far away and may be able to give more insight into who she may be associated with. Igler told detectives that Aumüller had been spending most of her free time with Father Schmidt, who had since been assigned to St. Joseph's Church.

Inspector Faurot and detectives Cassassa and O'Connell arrived at St. Joseph's Rectory at 11:30 pm on the night of September 13, 1913. After Faurot rang the bell, the senior pastor, Fr. Daniel Quinn, opened the door, led them into the parlor, and woke Schmidt. Upon being confronted by the inspector and the detectives, Schmidt admitted "I killed her! I killed her because I loved her!" Schmidt then described the murder and dismemberment in detail. As his fellow priests watched in horror, Schmidt was taken into police custody.

== Trials, appeals, and execution ==
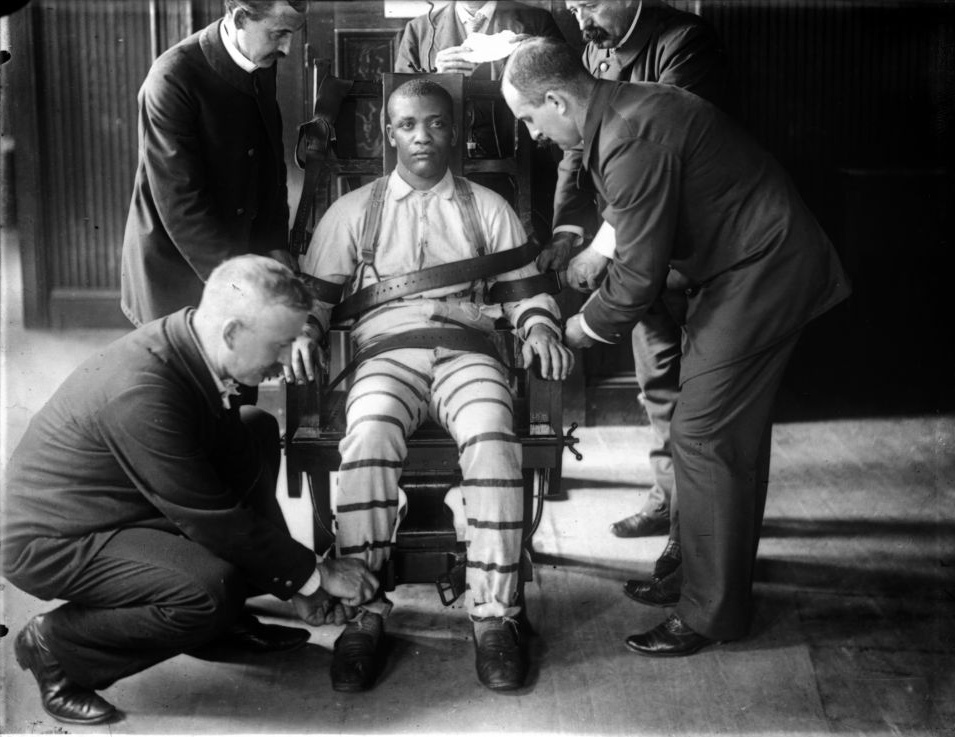
A man being strapped into the electric chair at Sing Sing prison in the early 20th century

A media spectacle ensued as the New York papers competed against each other with an ever greater degree of sensationalism regarding the case.

Following his arrest, the archdiocese of New York announced that Schmidt's priestly faculties had been indefinitely suspended.

During Schmidt's first trial, he pled not guilty by reason of insanity. His defense team accordingly used Schmidt's bisexuality and claims of hearing voices as proof of their client's psychosis. The defense also demonstrated that mental illness ran in Schmidt's family. They called psychologist Smith Ely Jeliffe, who testified that Schmidt's family tree showed up to 60 near or distant relatives who displayed signs of mental instability and, therefore, Schmidt should be spared the death penalty, because he too was insane. In rebuttal, the prosecution called in other witnesses, including multiple psychiatrists, who had questioned Schmidt before the trial. The testimony concluded that Schmidt was sane, in spite of his claims of hearing voices telling him to "sacrifice" Anna Aumüller. However, the prosecution's efforts were in vain; at the conclusion of the trial in December 1913, a hung jury was declared.

The second trial began approximately two weeks later. This time, the prosecution introduced new testimony. In April 1913, well before the defendant received his alleged command from God to "sacrifice" Aumüller, Schmidt had convinced a fellow German immigrant, a woman named Bertha Zech, to pose as Anna Aumüller and to purchase a $5000 life insurance policy in her name. The policy listed Schmidt as the sole beneficiary. Aumüller's close friend and coworker, Anna Hirt, then took the stand and testified that Aumüller had told her Schmidt was going to get her a life insurance policy for her birthday. After her birthday passed and he did not give it to her, Aumüller said she hoped he would give it to her as a wedding gift.

On February 5, 1914, after only three hours of deliberation, the jury found Hans Schmidt guilty of first degree murder. After being sentenced to the death penalty, he said, "I'm satisfied with the verdict. I would rather die today than tomorrow." He was sent to Sing Sing Prison to await execution.

Schmidt's defense team filed an appeal shortly after his sentence, which postponed his execution for at least a year while it worked its way through the courts. In December 1914, Schmidt admitted that he feigned insanity during his trials. In admitting so, however, he accused Ernest Muret, the dentist with whom he'd had a homosexual affair, of having accidentally killed Aumüller during a botched abortion. Schmidt further claimed that he allowed authorities to pursue him and not Dr. Muret for the murder because he wanted to cover for his male lover. Muret adamantly denied anything to do with Aumüller's death and police never found any evidence to the contrary.

Due in large part to both Muret and Bertha Zech's insistence to the contrary, Schmidt's new allegations were unsuccessful in gaining him a new trial. On February 18, 1916, Schmidt entered the Sing Sing death chamber at 5:50 AM. Moments before being seated in the electric chair, Schmidt said, "Pardon me. I beg the forgiveness of all whom I have offended and of all whom I have scandalized. I forgive all who have offended against me."

Moments before the switch was thrown, Schmidt said in a muffled voice, "My last thought is for my mother. Please give my mother my last good bye."

The first jolt of electricity was initiated at 5:51 AM. After two additional jolts were administered, the prison physician pronounced Hans Schmidt dead at 5:59 AM.

Though the Schmidt family originally intended to ship Schmidt's body home to Germany, the ongoing World War made these plans impossible. As a result, Fr. William Cashin, Sing Sing's Roman Catholic prison chaplain, arranged for burial in New York. Hans Schmidt is buried in the Sing-Sing Prison Cemetery.

== Other possible crimes ==
Apart from killing his young, pregnant "wife", further investigation revealed that Schmidt had a second apartment where he had set up a counterfeiting workshop.

Authorities suspected Schmidt of as many as four other murders. He had been seen with a woman named Helen Green. Green left for Chicago the month before Aumüller's murder, but had then disappeared. Police couldn't find any traces of Green. When he moved to America, Schmidt was seen with another woman whom he claimed was his wife. She also had disappeared.

Schmidt was suspected in the deaths of two children. The owner of the apartment complex where Schmidt was living said she sometimes saw him bringing a 5-year-old boy to his living room. Schmidt claimed the boy was his son. That boy had since disappeared. When the woman asked the boy for his name, he said it was August Van Dyke.

Schmidt became an alternate suspect in the murder of Alma Kellner (age 9) whose body was found buried in the basement of St. John's Church in Louisville, Kentucky, where he had once visited another priest. The body had been burned, but authorities suspected the killer had tried to dismember her. The janitor, Joseph Wendling, was convicted and sentenced to life in prison for the murder based on circumstantial evidence and bloody clothing found at his house. Upon the request of Alma's uncle, Wendling was pardoned and deported to his home country of France in 1935. No evidence has been found linking Schmidt to the area around the time that Alma Kellner went missing and any reports that Schmidt was assigned to the St. John's Church are false.
