= Debra Laefer =

American Geotechnical Engineer and director of citizen science

Debra F. Laefer
- Education: University of Illinois Urbana-Champaign (MS, PhD); NYU (MEng); Columbia University (BS, BA)
- Scientific career
- Workplaces: Tandon School of Engineering; University College Dublin
- Thesis: Prediction and Assessment of Ground Movement and Building Damage Induced by Adjacent Excavation (2001)

Debra Laefer is the Director of Citizen Science program within NYU's Center for Urban Science + Progress and Associate Professor of NYU's Tandon School of Engineering. Previously a professor at University College, Dublin, her research in geotechnical and structural engineering focuses on ways to preserve architecturally significant buildings from sub-surface construction.

Laefer leads the Urban Modelling Group which released the densest LiDAR dataset to date in order to facilitate urban development. She was also featured in a showcase of eight leading female scientists of Ireland in an exhibition in 2016.

Laefer earned her PhD from the University of Illinois at Urbana-Champaign in Geotechnical Civil Engineering. She holds a B.A. in Art History and a B.S. in Civil Engineering from Columbia University. She is a fellow of the Japan Society for the Promotion of Science and a Fulbright fellow.
