= Trump World Tower =

Residential skyscraper in Manhattan, New York

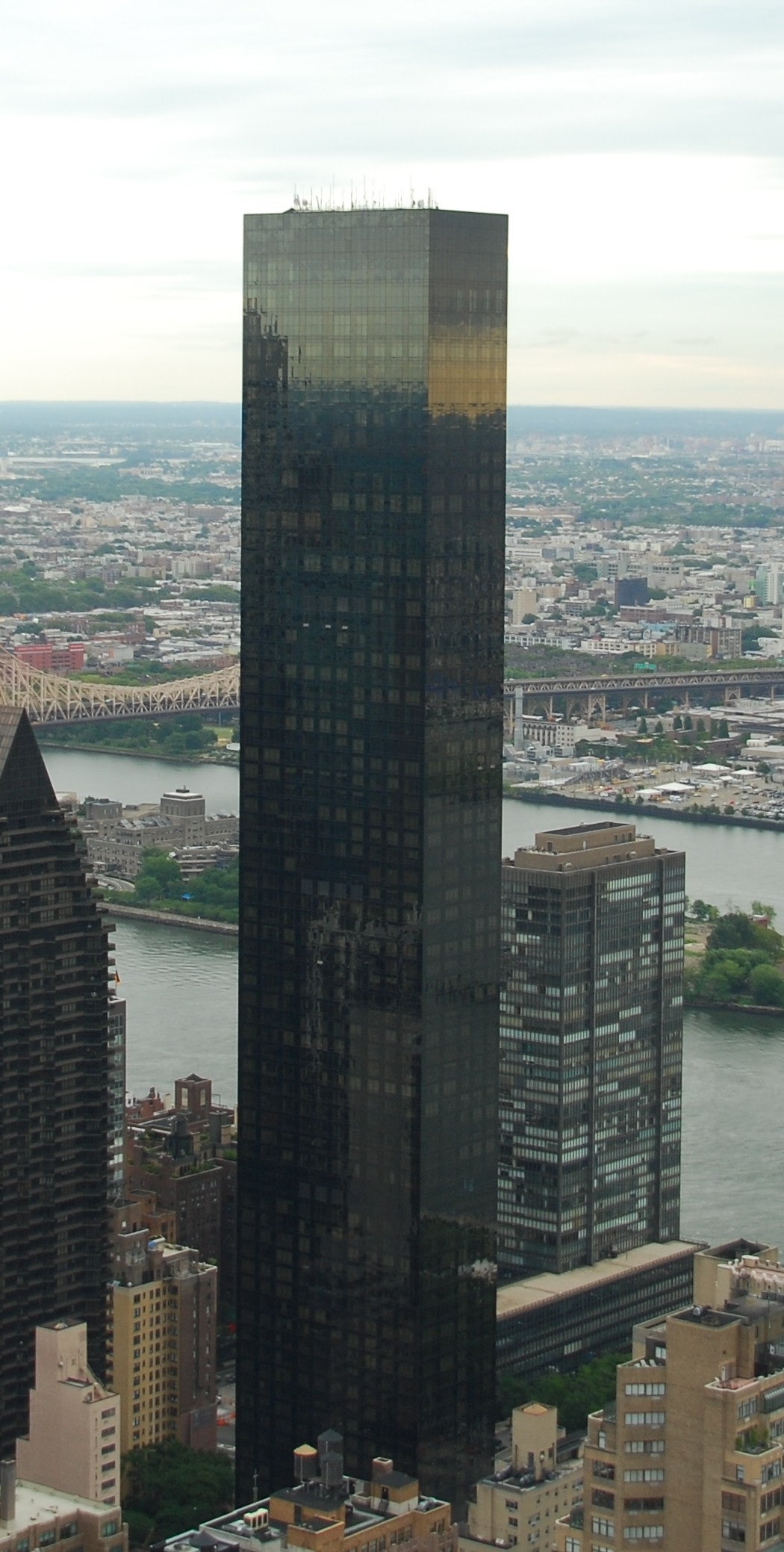
- Trump World Tower in Manhattan

General information
- Status: Completed
- Type: Residential
- Location: 845 United Nations Plaza (First Avenue), Manhattan, New York, U.S.
- Coordinates: 40°45′08″N 73°58′04″W
- Construction started: 1999
- Completed: 2001
- Cost: $300 million

Height
- Roof: 861 ft (262 m)
- Top floor: 756 ft (230 m)

Technical details
- Floor count: 72
- Floor area: 967,000 ft^{2} (89,800 m^{2})

Design and construction
- Architect: Costas Kondylis
- Developer: Daewoo E&C; The Trump Organization
- Structural engineer: WSP Cantor Seinuk
- Main contractor: Bovis Lend Lease

Other information
- Number of units: 376

Website
- www.trumpworldtower.com

Trump World Tower is a residential condominium building in the Turtle Bay neighborhood of Midtown Manhattan in New York City, United States. The tower is located at 845 United Nations Plaza, on First Avenue between 47th and 48th Streets. It was developed by Donald Trump and was constructed between 1999 and 2001.

== Architecture ==
Trump World Tower has 376 units. Designed by the architect Costas Kondylis, the building is 861 feet (262 m) high, but New York City Department of Buildings records give a separate figure of 843 feet (257 m). It has 72 constructed floors; the top floor is labeled 90, since Trump calculated the floor numbers by declaring the building to be 900 feet (270 m) high and then dividing that figure by 10. The curtain wall facades of dark, bronze-tinted glass. The tower is rectangular in plan, measuring 77 by 144 feet (23 by 44 m) with a slenderness ratio of 11:1. The resulting large windows allow for extensive views of the East River and Midtown Manhattan. The building is constructed with concrete to increase its wind resistance.

== History ==
In 1961, the 18-story United Engineering Center was built on the site. The Center was demolished to make way for the Trump World Tower. In 1997, Donald Trump and his partners, including the Daewoo Corp., a South Korean chaebol, signed a deal to purchase the site from the United Engineering Trustees for $52 million. Trump also acquired unused air rights from at least seven adjacent low-rise properties, specifically two brownstones, the Church of the Holy Family and the Japan Society. Demolition began in October 1998.

Prior to construction, many neighbors, including veteran journalist Walter Cronkite, opposed the building due to its height and lack of distinguishing exterior features. Among the concerns was that this tower would dwarf the headquarters of the United Nations across the street, in particular the United Nations Secretariat Building. East Side neighbors who opposed the project raised $400,000 in a bid to defeat it, with investment manager and philanthropist Alberto Vilar contributing $100,000. Opponents argued that the project would block views, was aesthetically unappealing, violated zoning laws, and was out of character with the surrounding neighborhood. The Municipal Art Society also challenged the project on grounds of air pollution. Opponents lost their battle in state court.

Construction of the building began in 1999. The construction was financed by two German lenders, Deutsche Bank and Bayerische Hypo- und Vereinsbank.

Trump World Tower was briefly the tallest all-residential tower in the world, prior to the completion of the 21st Century Tower in Dubai (2003) and the Tower Palace 3 in Seoul (2004). The tallest of the handful of wholly residential towers completed to date by Trump, it cost approximately US$300 million to construct. The penthouse on the top two floors of the structure which totaled 20,000 square feet (1,858 m^{2}) was priced at $58 million; however, after failing to sell for years, it was split into four different units.

Around 2006, Trump was involved in a struggle with the condominium board at the Trump World Tower. Trump requested the assistance of lawyer Michael Cohen, and Trump gained control of the board.

== Occupants ==
The tower's most expensive floors attracted wealthy buyers from the former Soviet Union. Approximately 65 units were sold to Russian buyers in the late 1990s. New York Yankees star Derek Jeter purchased a 5,425-square-foot (504 m^{2}) condominium for $12.6 million in 2001, and sold it in 2012 for $15.5 million. In 2002, Bill Gates, Harrison Ford, and Sophia Loren were reported to have owned or rented apartments in the building. Trump sold the 45th floor in June 2001 for $4.5 million to Saudi Arabia, which made the apartments part of its Mission to the United Nations in 2008. George and Kellyanne Conway owned a condominium unit at Trump World Tower during the early 2000s.

Socialite Jocelyn Wildenstein owned a 5,160-square-foot (479 m^{2}), eight bedroom penthouse in the Tower. In 2015 she listed it for $17.5 million, but it did not sell. In February 2017 she relisted it for $13 million.

The World Bar, a two-story bar and cocktail lounge, was located in the building. It was a popular spot among UN diplomats who worked nearby. The bar has since closed.

== In popular culture ==
The building and some of its condominium units have previously been featured on NBC's The Apprentice, which featured Trump. It has also appeared on the NBC syndicated television show Extra Season 13 - Ep. 193. The building also featured heavily in the 2007 film Before the Devil Knows You're Dead.

== See also ==
- List of tallest buildings in New York City
- List of things named after Donald Trump
