= United Engineering Center =

Former building in Manhattan, New York

General information
- Architectural style: Modernist
- Location: 345 East 47th Street, New York City, United States
- Coordinates: 40°45′9″N 73°58′4″W
- Groundbreaking: October 1, 1959
- Opened: September 5, 1961
- Demolished: 1998
- Cost: US$12,500,000
- Owner: United Engineering Trustees, Inc.

Height
- Height: 283 ft (86 m)

Technical details
- Floor count: 20

Design and construction
- Architecture firm: Shreve, Lamb & Harmon
- Structural engineer: Seelye, Stevenson, Value and Knecht
- Services engineer: Jaros, Baum & Bolles
- Main contractor: Turner Construction

The United Engineering Center was a building in the Turtle Bay neighborhood of Manhattan in New York City that served as the headquarters of several national associations of professional engineers and included an auditorium, exhibition hall, and library. Located on the west side of United Nations Plaza between East 47th and 48th streets—across from the headquarters of the United Nations—the building opened in 1961 and superseded the Engineering Societies' Building, which had become too small for the engineering societies' needs. By the mid-1990s, the United Engineering Center had become inefficient at serving the needs of the organizations it housed; the building was sold and demolished in 1998 in order to make way for the Trump World Tower.

== History ==
=== Planning and development ===
By the early 1950s, the professional engineering organizations that occupied the Engineering Societies' Building on West 39th Street in Midtown Manhattan had outgrown their space and were seeking larger accommodations. The building was owned and operated by the United Engineering Trustees (UET), which represented the four "founder societies" and the major tenants of the building: American Society of Civil Engineers (ASCE); American Society of Mechanical Engineers (ASME); American Institute of Electrical Engineers (AIEE); and American Institute of Mining, Metallurgical, and Petroleum Engineers (AIME). At that time, a fifth organization, the American Institute of Chemical Engineers (AIChE), wanted to join the group and move into the new building with the other engineering societies. The Engineering Societies' Building also served as the home of the Engineering Societies Library (ESL), which was one of the largest engineering libraries in the world.

There were initial considerations of a constructing a new engineering center in another part of New York City—including sites on the campus of Columbia University and adjacent to the New York Coliseum—but these locations were dismissed as being impracticable. A number of other cities in the United States—including Chicago, Hoboken, Kansas City, Miami, Philadelphia, Pittsburgh, Shreveport, St. Louis, and Washington—tried to entice the engineering societies to relocate from their national headquarters in New York City. In 1955, a committee established by the five major engineering societies recommended moving to Pittsburgh, which had offered a $1.5 million cash incentive and an additional gift of $500,000 from the Mellon family. The recommendation to relocate was met with opposition from members of each of the societies, and the following year, another committee of the five major engineering societies recommended to retain the headquarters in New York City. UET then hired Shreve, Lamb & Harmon to prepare preliminary architectural plans and studies for a new engineering center in Manhattan, exploring options of utilizing the present site of the Engineering Societies' Building or a new location in the area between 34th and 57th streets.

On August 1, 1957, UET announced that it had acquired the majority of a new site for the proposed engineering center. The property was located on the west side of United Nations Plaza between East 47th and 48th streets, across from the headquarters of the United Nations, and consisted of a five-story tenement, parking facilities and vacant land. The owner of the smallest piece of land had held out and did not want to sell, but with the help of Robert Moses he finally changed his mind and decided to sell the property. The UET also signed a contract to purchase the remaining lot at the northeast corner of the site and take title to the land about a year later. Overall, the land lot for the proposed building had an area of 37,500 square feet (3,480 m^{2}), with a depth of 150 feet (46 m) on East 47th Street and a depth of 225 feet (69 m) on East 48th Street.

Shreve, Lamb & Harmon were selected by UET as the architects of the new building on July 22, 1957. The following month, the firm of Seelye, Stevenson, Value and Knecht was approved as the building's structural engineer and Jaros, Baum & Bolles was approved as the building's mechanical engineer. A campaign to raise funds for the new engineering center—the United Engineering Center (UEC)—was launched on November 21, 1957, at a dinner held at the Waldorf Astoria Hotel. The honorary chairman of the fundraising committee was former President of the United States (and an engineer) Herbert Hoover, who spoke at the dinner about the nation's recent decline in training scientists and engineers compared to the Soviet Union, which had recently launched Sputnik.

=== Construction and opening ===
UET signed a contract with Turner Construction to construct the UEC on May 28, 1959. A groundbreaking ceremony for the new building was held on October 1, 1959, and attended by Herbert Hoover. Hoover, along with New York City Mayor Robert F. Wagner Jr., were present for the cornerstone laying ceremony on June 16, 1960.

The UEC was opened on September 5, 1961, after the engineering organizations had moved into the new building over Labor Day weekend. The engineering societies that were originally housed in the building included the five founder societies (ASCE, ASME, AIEE, AIME, and AIChE) as well as fifteen other organizations:

- American Institute of Consulting Engineers
- American Engineers' Council for Professional Development
- American Institute of Industrial Engineers (Institute of Industrial and Systems Engineers, now in Norcross, Georgia (northeast of Atlanta))
- American Society of Heating, Refrigerating and Air-Conditioning Engineers (now in Atlanta)
- American Welding Society
- Engineering Foundation
- Engineering Index Service
- ESL
- Engineers Joint Council
- Illuminating Engineering Society
- Junior Engineers Technical Society
- Municipal Engineers of the City of New York
- Society of Women Engineers
- UET
- Welding Research Council

Organizations were allowed to take as much space as they desired in the building, and the amount of space taken by each group ranged from as little as one room to as much as three entire floors. Two of the floors were initially left unfinished and vacant, providing space for additional organizations to move into the building at a later date.

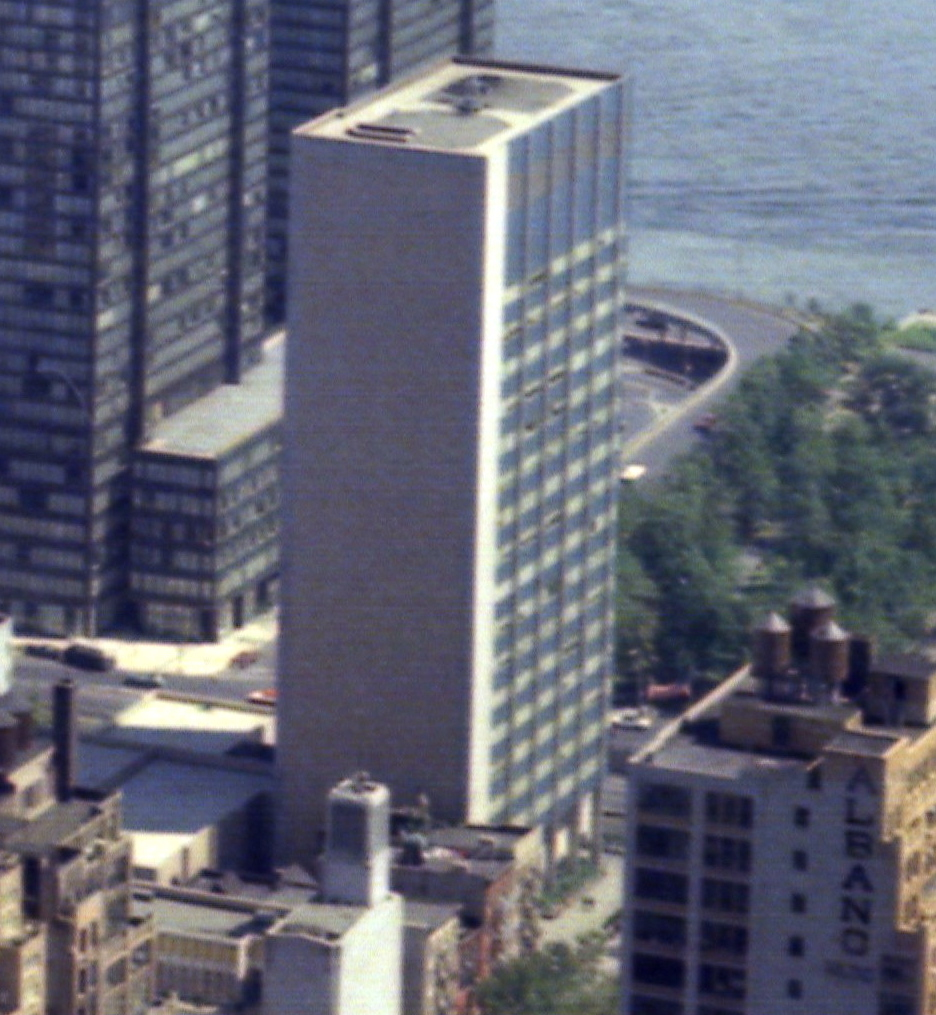
Aerial view of Turtle Bay in 1967, looking east with the UEC in front of the twin-towered 860-870 United Nations Plaza

The first official event at the UEC was a luncheon held on September 28, 1961, for the building's neighbors and included representatives from the American Institute of Physics, Boys' Clubs of America, Carnegie Endowment for International Peace, IBM World Trade Corporation, Society of Automotive Engineers, United Nations, and United States Mission to the United Nations. The event also included the opening of a metal box that was set in the cornerstone of the Engineering Societies' Building in 1906. The UEC was one of 28 new buildings that were constructed in the neighborhood between 1951 (when the headquarters of the United Nations was completed) and 1965.

The $12.5 million UEC was formally dedicated on November 9, 1961, with Herbert Hoover and Mayor Wagner in attendance. At the event, the Hoover Medal was presented to Mervin Kelly by Hoover himself. The principal speaker at the dedication ceremony was Dr. Eric A. Walker, the president of Pennsylvania State University.

=== Sale and redevelopment ===
In 1993, UET briefly listed the UEC on the market and the building was considered to be a top candidate for additional space needed by the United Nations International Children's Emergency Fund (UNICEF). That same year, UET decided to merge the ESL with another library. In 1995, the bulk of the ESL's collection was moved to the Linda Hall Library in Kansas City. A portion of the ESL's holdings known as the Wheeler Gift Collection had been given to AIEE with the stipulation that the items remain in New York City, so they were transferred to the New York Public Library. Another part of the ESL's holdings that primarily consisted of maps, plans, and photographs was transferred to the Library of Congress in Washington, D.C. As part of the merging of the ESL, a reading room and an information center with access to the Linda Hall Library was provided at the UEC.

In the mid-1990s, UET decided to sell the UEC and capitalize on New York's strong real estate market, with the proceeds from the sale being distributed among the five founder societies. The building's location was considered to be prime real estate and had unobstructed views of the United Nations and the East River. The building's age and inefficiencies, as well as the changing needs of the organizations it housed, also factored into the decision, as some of the societies had decided to relocate their offices elsewhere.

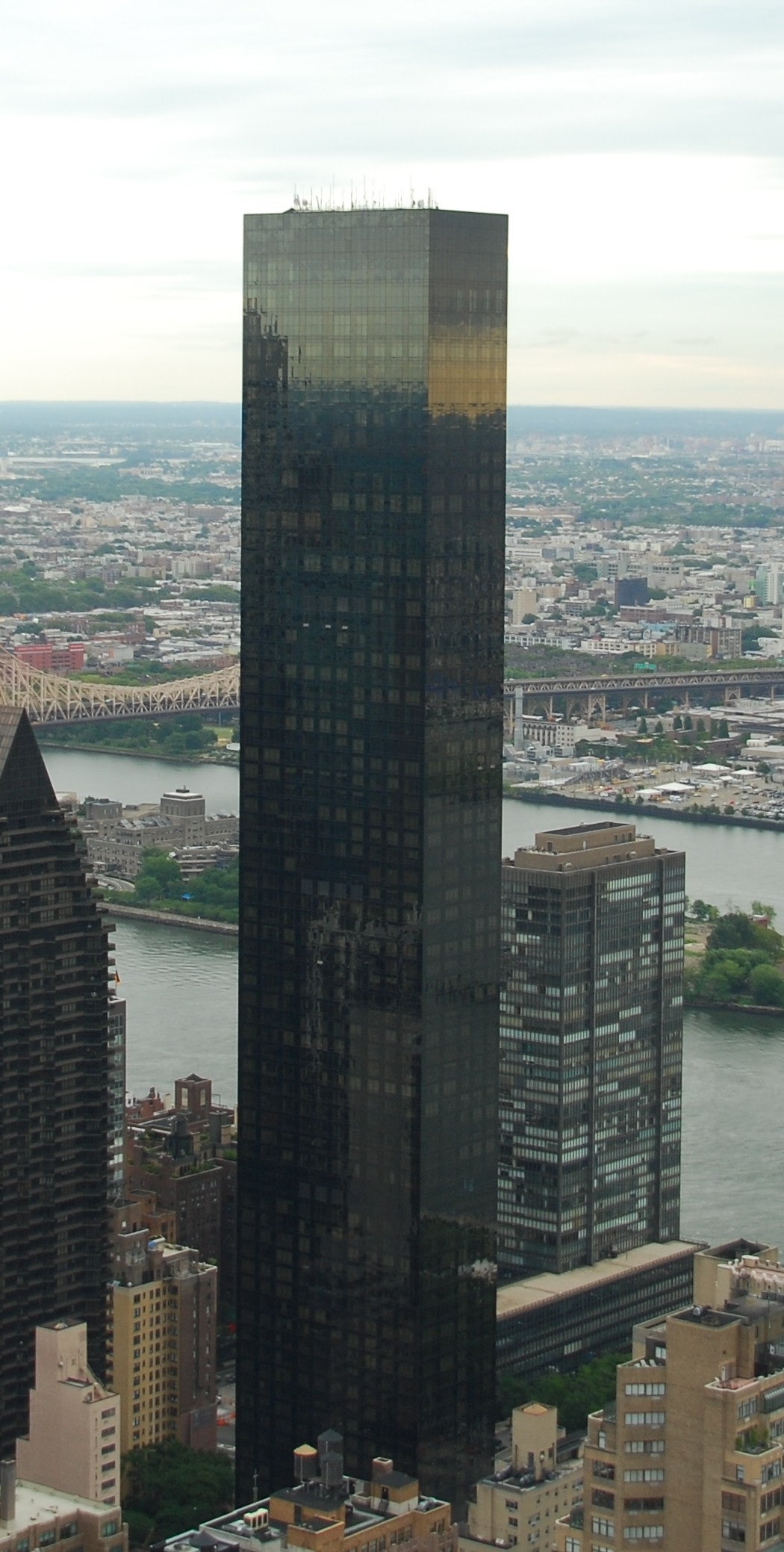
View looking east at Trump World Tower in 2009

The developer (and later U.S. President) Donald Trump and the Daewoo Corporation signed a contract to purchase the site in 1997. Meanwhile, Trump began buying unused air rights from neighboring properties on the west side of the property, including the Church of the Holy Family and the Japan Society. These air rights, along with a planned public plaza, would enable a larger building to be constructed as-of-right within the existing zoning regulations. The UEC was sold the following year for $53.5 million. Demolition of the UEC began on October 15, 1998, to make way for the 861-foot-high (262 m) Trump World Tower.

Three of the five founder societies that had occupied the UEC—ASME, AIChE, and the Institute of Electrical and Electronics Engineers (the successor of AIEE)—relocated their corporate offices to 3 Park Avenue; ASCE and AIME each had a small office suite in the same building. ASCE had previously relocated its headquarters from New York City to Reston, Virginia, in 1996.

== Architecture ==
=== Exterior ===
The exterior of the UEC was designed in the modernist architecture style to complement the United Nations Secretariat Building. The building included a twenty-story, 283-foot-tall (86 m) tower that rose above a three-story base and was fabricated out of glass, stainless steel, and limestone. A total of 170,000 pounds (77,000 kg) of stainless steel was used for the window frames and mullions as well as the covers of the columns protruding from the face of the tower; the material was selected for its appearance, durability, and low cost of maintenance. The face of the tower also had a curtain wall with bluish gray-tinted glass in the spandrels between floors. The main entrance to the building was set back 27 feet (8.2 m) from East 47th Street to create a plaza.

=== Interior ===
The main floor of the building included a lobby, exhibition hall, auditorium, and dining/conference rooms. A 6,000-square-foot (560 m^{2}) exhibition hall was located next to the lobby and included floor-to-ceiling glass windows on the east side of the building facing United Nations Plaza. The auditorium could fit up to 400 people and could be subdivided into three smaller meeting rooms. Dining/conference rooms, with capacities of 20–100 people, were located across from a pantry connected to a kitchen in the basement. The basement level (located at street level on East 48th Street due to grade changes on the site) also included an employees' lounge and a 250-seat dining room that surrounded an interior courtyard as well as the building's service entrance and loading dock. The ESL could hold up to 225,000 volumes and included a reading room with seating for up to 80 people on the second floor.

The offices for the individual organizations were located in the tower, which included mechanical floors on the upper two levels. The 69-by-139-foot (21 by 42 m) tower was designed to accommodate a future expansion by placing additional floors over the library on the third through twelfth floors. A total of four elevators served the tower and provisions were made so that two more elevators could be added if the building was expanded. The tower contained 258,000 square feet (24,000 m^{2}) of office space and up to 75,000 square feet (7,000 m^{2}) of space could be added by the expansion.
