= Faurot =

Faurot may refer to:

- Faurot Field, home field of the University of Missouri Tigers in Columbia, Missouri
- Don Faurot (1902–1995), head football coach at the University of Missouri
- Ron Faurot (born January 27, 1962), former professional American football defensive lineman
- Inspector Faurot, of the New York City Hans B. Schmidt case
