= Dag Hammarskjöld Plaza =

Public park in Manhattan, New York

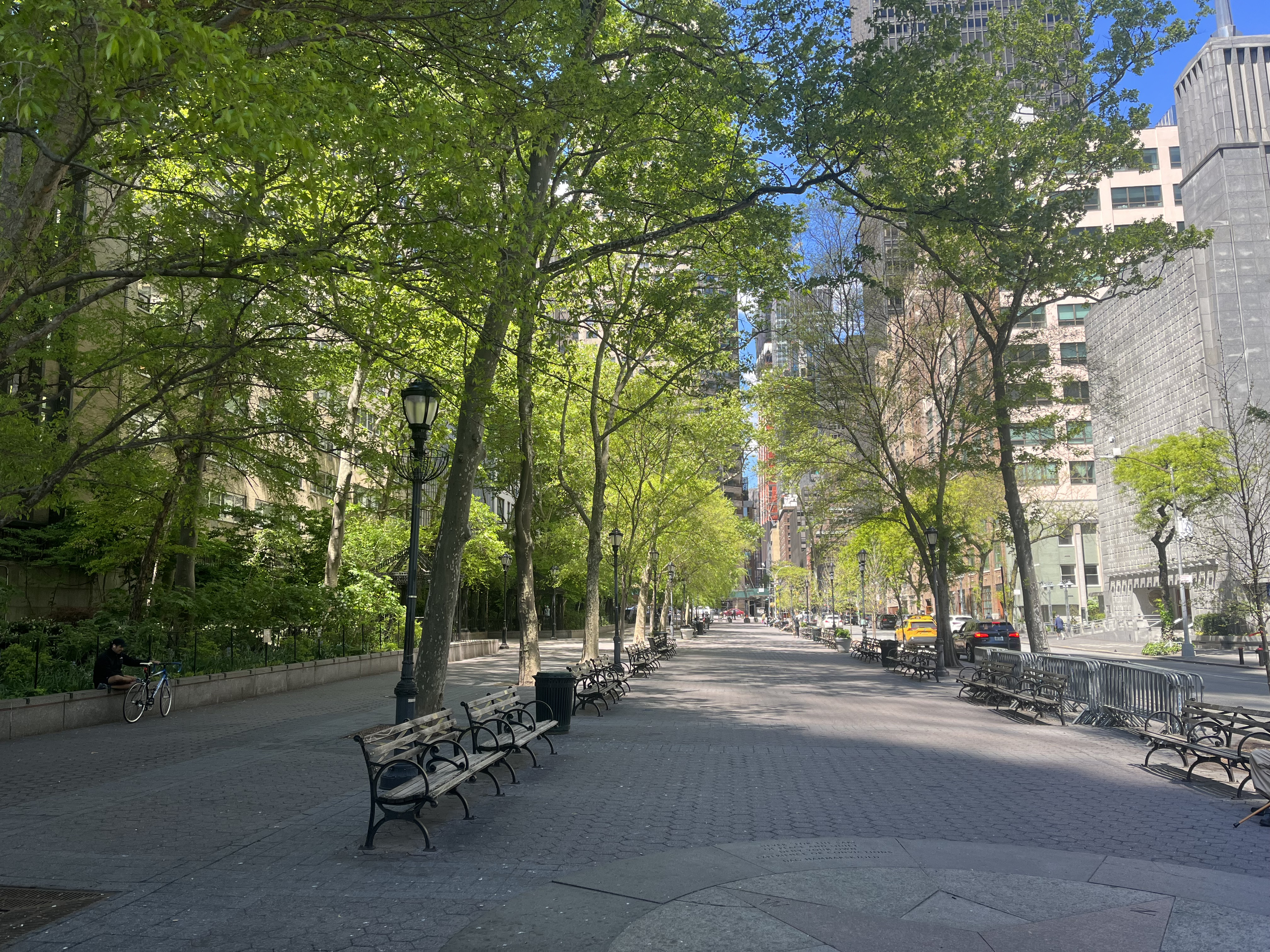
- Dag Hammarskjöld Plaza in 2023
- Interactive map of Dag Hammarskjöld Plaza
- Type: Urban park
- Location: Turtle Bay, Manhattan, New York, US
- Coordinates: 40°45′09″N 73°58′09″W
- Area: 1.59 acres (0.64 ha)
- Created: 1948
- Operator: New York City Department of Parks and Recreation

Dag Hammarskjöld Plaza is a 1.59-acre (0.64 ha) public park in the Turtle Bay neighborhood of Manhattan in New York City, New York, U.S. Located on the south side of East 47th Street between First and Second avenues, the park was established during the late 1940s and early 1950s, when 47th Street was widened to create a landscaped approach to the headquarters of the United Nations. It was renamed after Dag Hammarskjöld, the Secretary-General of the United Nations, after his death in 1961. The New York City Department of Parks and Recreation announced plans in the early 1990s to expand the plaza, which was completed in 1999.

The plaza is a frequent site of protests and demonstrations given its location near the United Nations headquarters.

== History ==
=== Establishment of park ===
Plans for the new park were originally conceived in 1947 as part of a new landscaped approach to the headquarters of the United Nations, which then was being developed on the east side of First Avenue between East 42nd and 48th streets in Turtle Bay, Manhattan. The city proposed widening and reconstructing several streets in the vicinity of the United Nations to accommodate the new complex, one of which was the segment of East 47th Street from First to Second avenues. Specifically, the city's plans called to widen this street from 60 to 160 feet (18 to 49 m) to create a two-way thoroughfare. The road was to consist of two 30-foot-wide (9.1 m) roadways separated by a 12-foot-wide (3.7 m) median, with a landscaped park running along the remainder of the south side of the street. This project was to cost about $1 million. The widened section of 47th Street was intended to serve the northern part of the United Nations headquarters, complementing the widening of 42nd Street to the south.

The project required condemnation of all of the buildings along the south side of East 47th Street, including St. Boniface Church, the church's rectory and parochial school, and a furniture maker. Over 2,000 people signed a petition sent to the Board of Estimate to block the proposed demolition of St. Boniface Church and asked the city to select another street to serve as the approach to the United Nations. Other groups felt that the city's proposal was inadequate. William Zeckendorf submitted a plan to redevelop six blocks from First to Third avenues with a 320-foot (98 m) wide east-west concourse leading to the north end of the United Nations site. The New York chapter of the American Institute of Architects (AIA) proposed a 150-foot (46 m) wide east-west approach running through a nine-block redevelopment area bounded by First Avenue, 45th Street, Lexington Avenue, and 48th Street. The AIA claimed their plan would require the demolition of only two large buildings, one of which was a ten-story YMCA branch at 224 East 47th Street.

The city decided to proceed with its original plan in August 1947, believing that the other proposals for "monumental" approaches were not justified given the city's financial condition and the legal obstacles that they would face. A New York Supreme Court justice determined in January 1948 that the properties, which the city was to acquire for the widening of 47th Street, were worth $1.435 million. The Board of Estimate authorized $3 million for the acquisition of property in August 1948. The city revised its plans for the widening of 42nd and 47th streets near the UN headquarters in March 1950, raising the total cost of the two projects by $3 million. During the construction of the UN headquarters, the planned Secretariat Building was shifted closer to 42nd Street. As a result, the enlarged portion of 47th Street failed to serve as a proper approach to the UN headquarters once the complex was completed, as the street ended at a park north of the General Assembly Building. In the book New York 1960, architect Robert A. M. Stern and his co-authors characterized the widened street as "in many ways an empty gesture".

=== Renaming and use ===
After Dag Hammarskjöld, the Secretary-General of the United Nations, was killed in a plane crash while traveling on a peacekeeping mission to the Congo, the New York City Council approved legislation to rename the park on 47th Street in his honor. Dag Hammarskjöld Plaza was formally renamed on November 11, 1961. New York City and UN officials announced plans in April 1964 to redesign the plaza by adding a wall with quotations from the late Secretary-General. The plans also included a memorial footbridge over First Avenue, designed by Daniel Chait, which would connect the plaza with the UN headquarters. The city government provided $255,375 in December 1965 for the footbridge, which was never completed. Another unrealized plan, in 1968, called for Dag Hammarskjöld Plaza to be redesigned into an actual park. At the time, The Washington Post and Times-Herald described the park as "a rather sorry affair which has only a row of young trees to justify its name".

In 1970, the western portion of the park was leased for 125 years to developer Harry Macklowe for incorporation into the plaza and arcade for the new office building at 866 Second Avenue, also known as 2 Hammarskjold Plaza. As part of the agreement, the developer built a sculpture garden and was responsible for its maintenance. In exchange, Macklowe was permitted to add 25,000 ft^{2} (2,300 m^{2}) to his building. After advocacy from local civic groups, the western part of the plaza was redesigned in 1985.

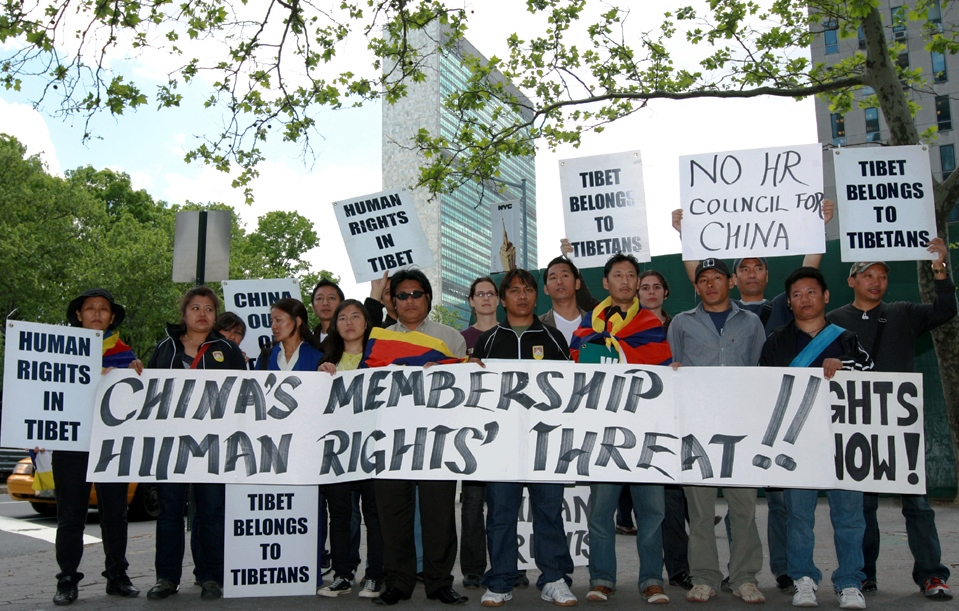
The plaza is a common site for protests and demonstrations given its proximity to the United Nations.

Throughout its history, Dag Hammarskjöld Plaza has been the site of numerous political protests and demonstrations given its location near the United Nations. The New York Times wrote in 1991 that Dag Hammarskjöld Plaza, along with the smaller Ralph Bunche Park at 43rd Street and First Avenue, were "the city's speakers' corners. The soapboxes to the world." At the time, the New York City Department of Parks and Recreation (NYC Parks) was issuing more permits for protests at the two parks than at any other part of the city; in 1990 alone, NYC Parks issued 236 permits for protests at these parks. The plaza has also served as a focal point for major marches, including the end point of marches supporting the Soviet Jewry movement in the 1970s and 1980s and the starting point of the 2017 Women's March in New York City.

=== Renovations ===
In the early 1990s, NYC Parks made plans for a $2.5 million expansion and renovation of the park, which would include removing the elevated sculpture garden at the west end of the park and the eastbound roadway on East 47th Street. These plans were met by opposition from some of the local residents, who said the plaza had become overrun by homeless in the prior decade and did not want homeless encampments to grow larger. Homeless persons had congregated in the sculpture garden at the park's western end, which was no longer displaying sculptures and was seen as a security risk by local residents. In 1993, Friends of Hammarskjold Park was formed as a community organization to address concerns that these problems would continue in a new and expanded park. The renovations to Dag Hammarskjöld Plaza were designed by NYC Parks architect George Vellonakis and included six fountains within reflecting pools, steel lattice pavilions and colonnade, and new landscaping and benches.

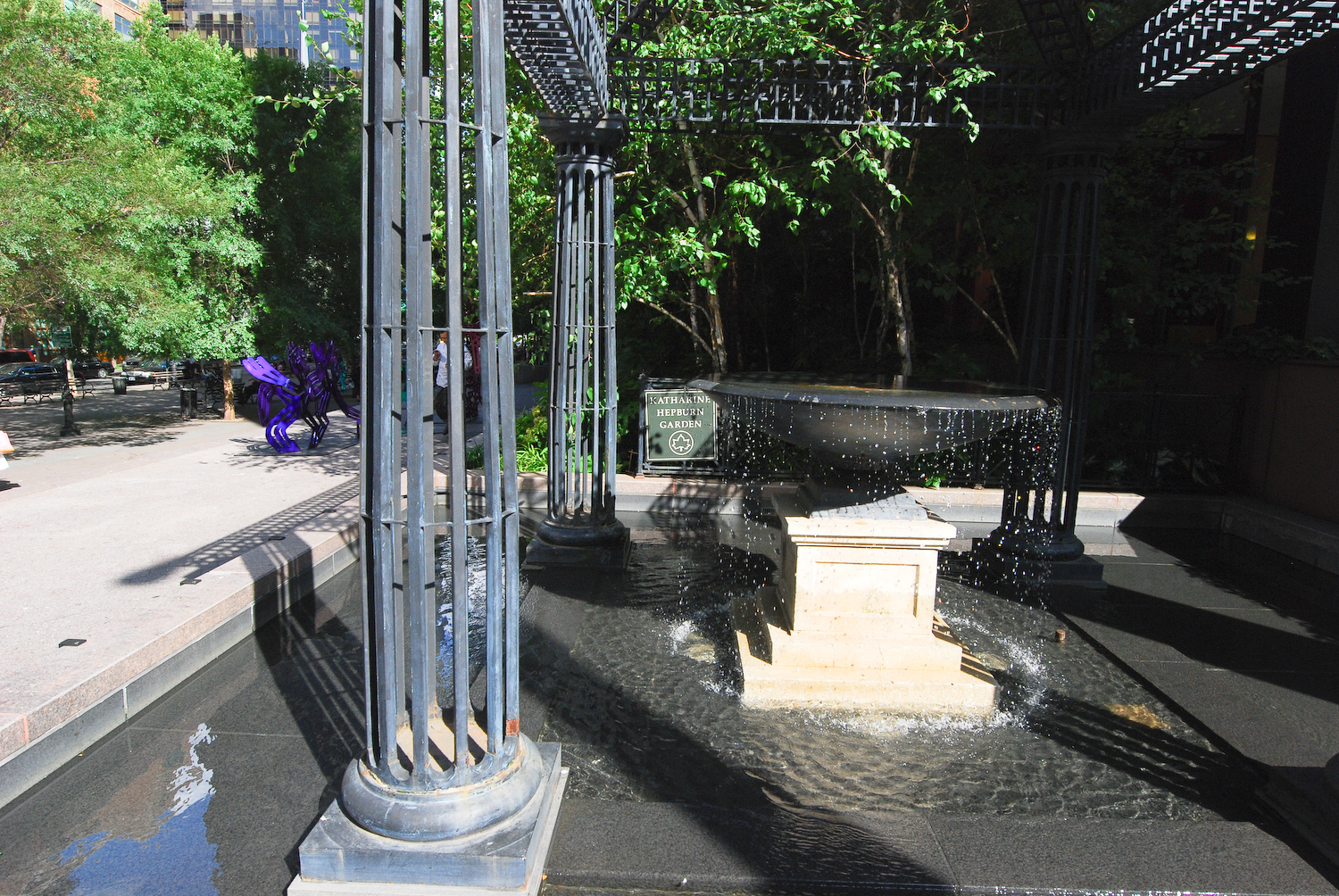
Renovations to the park included the addition of fountains within reflecting pools and steel lattice pavilions.

The owners of 866 Second Avenue, a consortium of investors who bought that building from Macklowe, agreed in 1994 to rebuild the plaza's sculpture garden for $300,000, in exchange for being absolved of responsibility for the garden's upkeep. The plans include lowering the sculpture garden so it was more visible from the street. As part of the renovations, a garden was created along the southern edge of the park and dedicated to actress Katharine Hepburn on May 12, 1997, her ninetieth birthday. The former actress had been a resident of the Turtle Bay neighborhood for six decades and fought to save trees on her block. Katharine Hepburn Garden includes a bench taken from her estate in Fenwick, Connecticut, stepping stones inscribed with her quotations, and tablets with pictures from her films.

The final phase of the renovation, which included narrowing 47th Street between First and Second avenues to a westbound-only, three-lane street, could not commence until eastbound M27 and M50 crosstown buses were rerouted away from the plaza. The Metropolitan Transportation Authority (MTA) proposed rerouting the buses onto either 46th or 48th Street, but residents of both streets opposed the plans. Mayor Rudy Giuliani decided in December 1997 to cancel plans for the final phase of the renovation, which involved converting the eastbound roadway into an expanded plaza, after local residents and the city government were unable to agree on plans to narrow 47th Street. This led Hepburn to threaten to remove her name from the garden. The city announced that it would go ahead with the park expansion in September 1998 after an agreement was reached with the MTA to reroute the M27 and M50 buses onto non-residential 42nd Street. The expansion of the plaza was completed in August 1999, which increased the size of the park by half an acre.

In 2000, a weekly greenmarket was added to the park, which continues to be held each Wednesday and is managed by GrowNYC. The following year, a small cafe opened in a private concession space near the eastern end of the park that was designed by NYC Parks to resemble a glass greenhouse. By the 21st century, Katharine Hepburn's birthday was celebrated at the park's Katharine Hepburn Garden annually.
