= Alienism =

Alienism is an obsolete term for psychiatry, the study and treatment of mental illnesses. In the early 20th century this term was replaced by that of psychiatrist.

Alienism or alienist may also refer to:

- Alienist (album), a 2016 album by the avant-garde music group Psychic TV
- The Alienist, a 1994 crime novel by Caleb Carr
  - The Alienist (TV series), a 2018 U.S. period drama based on the 1994 novel
- "O alienista" (translated as "The Psychiatrist" then "The Alienist"), a satiric novella written by the Brazilian author Machado de Assis
  - The Alienist (film), a 1970 Brazilian comedy based on the novella

== See also ==
- Alien (disambiguation)
- Alienation (disambiguation)
