= Japan Society (Manhattan) =

Non-profit organization

Coordinates: 40°45′9″N 73°58′6″W

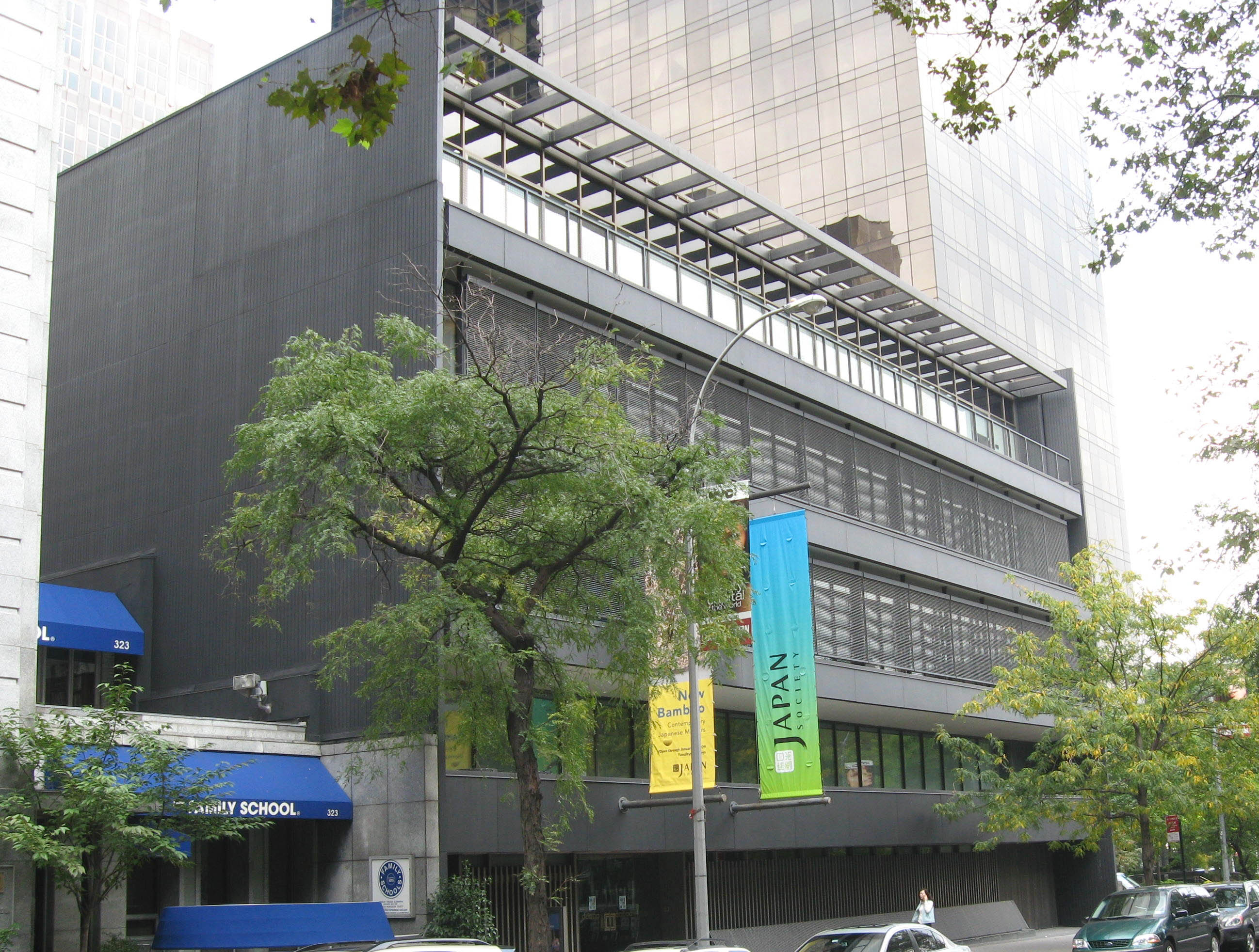
- Founded: May 19, 1907
- Type: Educational/Non-Profit
- Purpose: Education
- Location: 333 East 47th Street, New York City, NY
- Region served: New York City, NY
- Method: Film screenings, Lectures, Symposia, Cultural lectures, Workshops, Art Exhibitions
- Key people: Katherine "Kemy" Monahan, President and CEO; Ruri Kawashima, Tokyo Representative
- Revenue: $13,786,026 (2023)
- Endowment: $67,157,963 (2023)
- Website: https://www.japansociety.org

Japan Society is a 501(c)(3) nonprofit organization, formed in 1907 to promote relations between the United States and Japan. Its headquarters was designed by Junzo Yoshimura and opened in 1971 at 333 East 47th Street near the United Nations. With a focus on "arts and culture, public policy, business, language, and education", the organization has regularly held events in its many facilities, including a library, art gallery, and theater, since its opening. After suspending all activities during World War II, Japan Society expanded under the leadership of John D. Rockefeller III.

== History ==
=== Incorporation ===
In 1907, Tamemoto Kuroki and Goro Ijuin were chosen to represent Japan at the Jamestown Exposition. They attended a welcome dinner in New York City with Japanese ambassador to the United States, Shuzo Aoki, where there was talk of forming an organization to promote US-Japan relations in the city. Two days later at a luncheon held by Kuroki, Japan Society was born. The organization would be run by Aoki, then Honorary President of the Japan Society of the UK, and John Huston Finley. Japan Society spent the next forty years hosting events in honor of Japanese royalty, giving annual lectures on a wide range of topics, and presenting art exhibits that drew in thousands of New Yorkers. In 1911, Lindsay Russell, another founding member of the society and later president, met with Emperor Meiji and spent his visit to Japan encouraging more societies to form there and throughout the United States.

Japan Society was soon incorporated under New York law and finally found a home near one of Russell's work offices, though it continued to relocate throughout its history before its current headquarters was opened in 1971. At this time, Japan Society and its members began to express interest in improving teaching about Japan in the United States. The organization began sponsoring trips to the country, publishing books, and sent a report to the Department of Education about the portrayal of Japan in American textbooks.

=== Early years ===
In 1915, Dr. Takamine Jōkichi, a founding member of the Japan Society and the founder of the Nippon Club, hosted a diplomatic banquet in New York City to honor the visit of Baron Eiichi Shibusawa to the United States. This gathering was attended by Theodore Roosevelt and William Howard Taft. Also in attendance were many members of the Japan Society, including Japanese Consul-General K. Midzuno, M. Zumoto translator and secretary for Baron Shibusawa, who was also part owner and editor of The Japan Times, the financier Jacob Schiff, and John Huston Finley, president of City College, who was elected Japan Society's first president. During this significant event there were discussions related to strengthening U.S. Japan relations and how best the U.S. and Japan could work together as allies during World War One.

Japan Society remained active during World War I, operating as it had for the last seven years, but the organization became more political when it began associating with the Anti-Alien Legislation Committee, an advocacy group that spoke out against yellow peril. Russell and Hamilton Holt, another founding member, used the organization's publications to defend all of Japan's actions at the time. Unbeknownst to anyone at the time, even one of Japan Society's writers secretly worked for the Japanese government with the task of improving Japan's image in the United States. The organization eventually realized the dangers of taking sides and by 1924 stopped publishing any political commentary.

On February 27, 1934, the Japan Society's Annual Dinner event honored the visit of Prince Iyesato Tokugawa. This diplomatic goodwill gathering took place at the Waldorf-Astoria Hotel with approximately 250 guests. Attendees included: Reverend James DeWolf Perry, presiding Bishop of the Protestant Episcopal Church of the United States, and great-nephew of Commodore Perry; former Ambassador to Japan Roland S. Morris of Philadelphia; and Henry Waters Taft President of the Japan Society of New York City, who presided over this event. Henry W. Taft was the brother of former President William Howard Taft.

By the 1930s, membership had dropped significantly due to financial difficulties and the Second Sino-Japanese War. Following the attack on Pearl Harbor in 1941, Henry Waters Taft immediately resigned as president after serving from 1922 to 1929 and again from 1934. Russell also stepped down as one of Japan Society's directors. All activities were suspended and would not resume until the Treaty of San Francisco was signed in 1951.

=== Resumption of activities ===
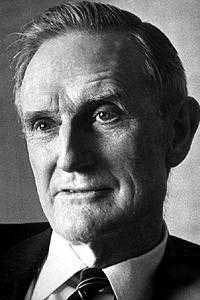
Rockefeller, who served as president and chairman from 1953 until his death in 1978, helped expand Japan Society.

John D. Rockefeller III served as president from 1952 to 1969 and then as chairman of the board until his death in 1978. He accompanied John Foster Dulles on his trip to Japan that eventually led to the signing of the 1951 treaty. Rockefeller, a supporter of the Institute of Pacific Relations who visited Japan in 1929 during one of its conferences, wanted to contribute to bettering US–Japan relations after the war and believed there needed to be non-governmental organizations like Japan Society in each country in order for such friendly relations to exist.

Under Rockefeller's leadership, Japan Society expanded and talk began to find a permanent headquarters for it. It shared offices with another Rockefeller-led organization, Asia Society, but as the two organizations continued to grow during the 1960s it became increasingly clear that Japan Society needed its own building. After receiving donations from Rockefeller and other members, construction began on "Japan House" in 1967. Designed by Junzo Yoshimura, whose work also includes Asia Society's headquarters, it became the first building in New York of contemporary Japanese architecture. On September 13, 1971, it was finally opened to the public after a ceremony attended by Prince Hitachi. He echoed Russell's first words about Japan Society, calling for "closer people-to-people" contact between the countries. In 1970, Rockefeller was succeeded by Japan-born lawyer Isaac Shapiro, who served as president until 1977.

In the late 1990s, the Japan Society sold unused air rights to Donald Trump, who used them along with air rights purchased from the Church of the Holy Family and other neighboring properties to develop the Trump World Tower at the east end of the block on the former site of the United Engineering Center.

In March 2021, Japan Society marked the 50th anniversary of the current headquarters' completion and as well as the 10th anniversary of Great East Japan earthquake and tsunami and the subsequent Fukushima nuclear disaster with an exhibition of traditional Japanese carpentry.

== See also ==
- Japanese in New York City
- Nippon Club (Manhattan)
