= St. Boniface Church (New York City) =

Demolished church in Manhattan, New York

Coordinates: 40°45′10″N 73°58′11″W

The Church of St. Boniface
- Interactive map of the The Church of St. Boniface area

General information
- Location: Manhattan, New York City, United States
- Construction started: 1868
- Completed: 1869
- Demolished: October 1950
- Client: Roman Catholic Archdiocese of New York

The Church of St. Boniface, also known as the Little Country Church of Old Turtle Bay, is a former Roman Catholic parish church under the authority of the Roman Catholic Archdiocese of New York, located at 882 Second Avenue in Manhattan, New York City.

The parish was established in 1858 by Rev. Matthew Jean Batiste Nicot to serve German immigrants that lived in the Turtle Bay neighborhood. Masses were initially held in a former carpenter's shop at the southeast corner of Second Avenue and East 47th Street before the congregation grew and raised enough funds to construct a new church. The interim chapel was replaced by a new brick church on the same site beginning in 1868, which was completed and dedicated in May of the following year. In 1869, a parochial school was also constructed behind the church at 312 East 47th Street that provided instruction to students in English and German. A rectory was later built between the church and school. The church was renovated in 1933 and rededicated by Cardinal Patrick Hayes.

In 1914, Rev. Francis X. E. Albert received permission to open St. Anthony's Chapel in the parish's school hall to provide special masses for its Italian-speaking members. Ten years later Cardinal Patrick Hayes decided to create a separate parish to serve the growing number of Italian immigrants in the area, which amounted to nearly 9,000 members. Property across the street from St. Boniface's Parochial School was purchased for the Church of the Holy Family; the new parish was headed by Father Daniel De Nonno, a priest at St. Boniface that had been closely involved with the chapel.

In 1947, the city proposed widening and reconstructing East 47th Street from Second Avenue to First Avenue to create a parkway approach to the Headquarters of the United Nations, which would open in 1951. Plans called to widen the street from 60 to 160 feet (18 to 49 m) to create a two-way thoroughfare consisting of two 30-foot (9.1 m) wide roadways separated by a 12-foot (3.7 m) wide median, with a landscaped park running along the south side of the street. This required condemnation of all of the buildings along the south side of East 47th Street, including St. Boniface's church, rectory, and parochial school. Over 2,000 people signed a petition sent to the Board of Estimate to block the proposed demolition of the church and asked the city to select another street to serve as the approach to the United Nations. The board authorized funds for property acquisition needed for the street widening in August 1948.

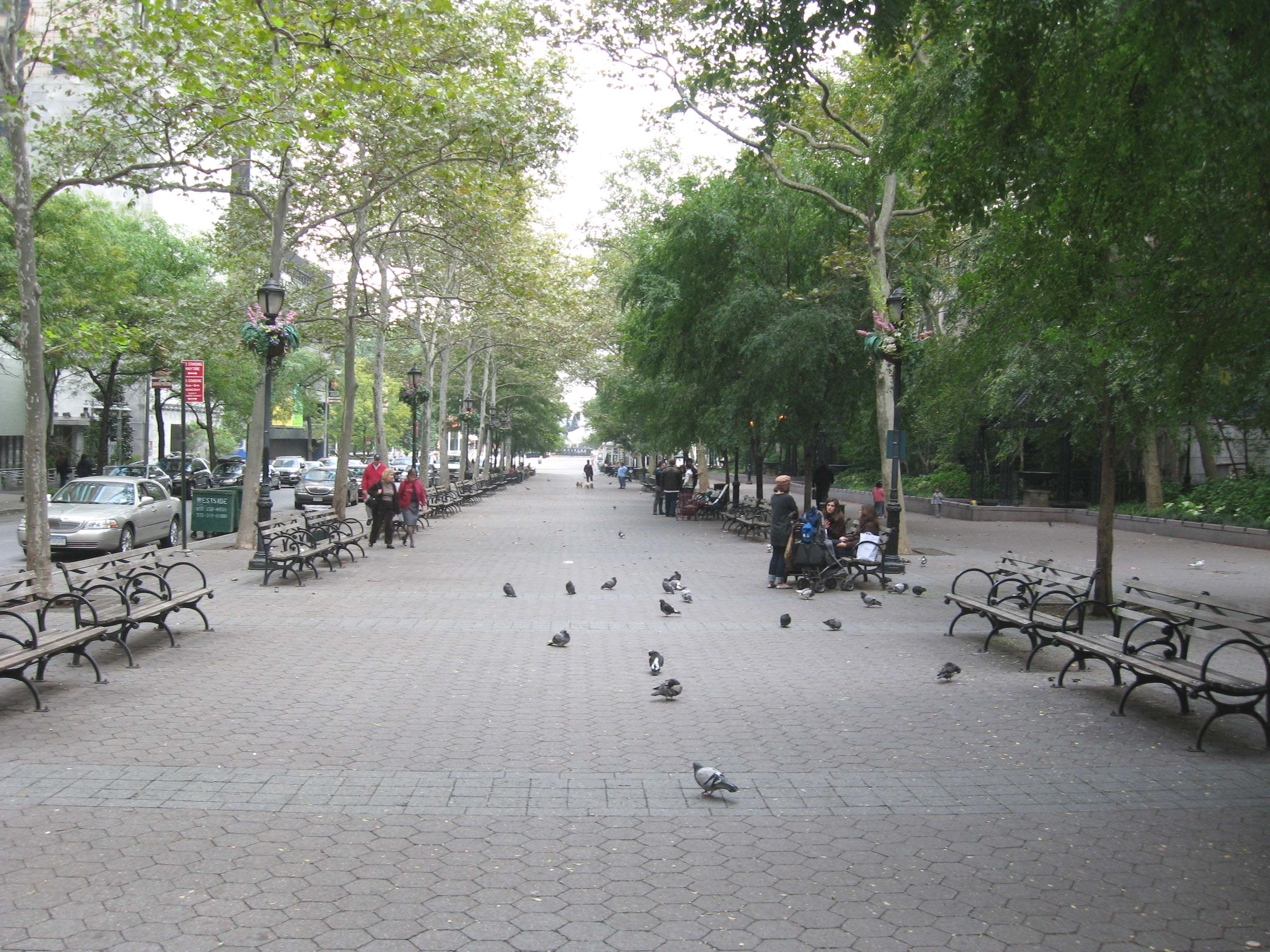
Dag Hammarskjöld Plaza now occupies the former site of the church

The final mass at the Church of St. Boniface was held on September 30, 1950 and demolition of the church began two days later. Its records are now housed at the Church of the Holy Family. Although the Church of the Holy Family was also located on East 47th Street between First and Second avenues, it was not affected by the widening because it was on the north side of the street. The site of the former church, rectory, and parochial school is now part of Dag Hammarskjöld Plaza; the segment of East 47th Street between First and Second avenues was converted back to a one-way westbound street in 1998 and the former eastbound roadway and median were incorporated into the public park along the south side of the street, which was named after Dag Hammarskjöld in 1961.
