= 47th Street (Manhattan) =

West-east street in Manhattan, New York

- Diamond Jewelry Way
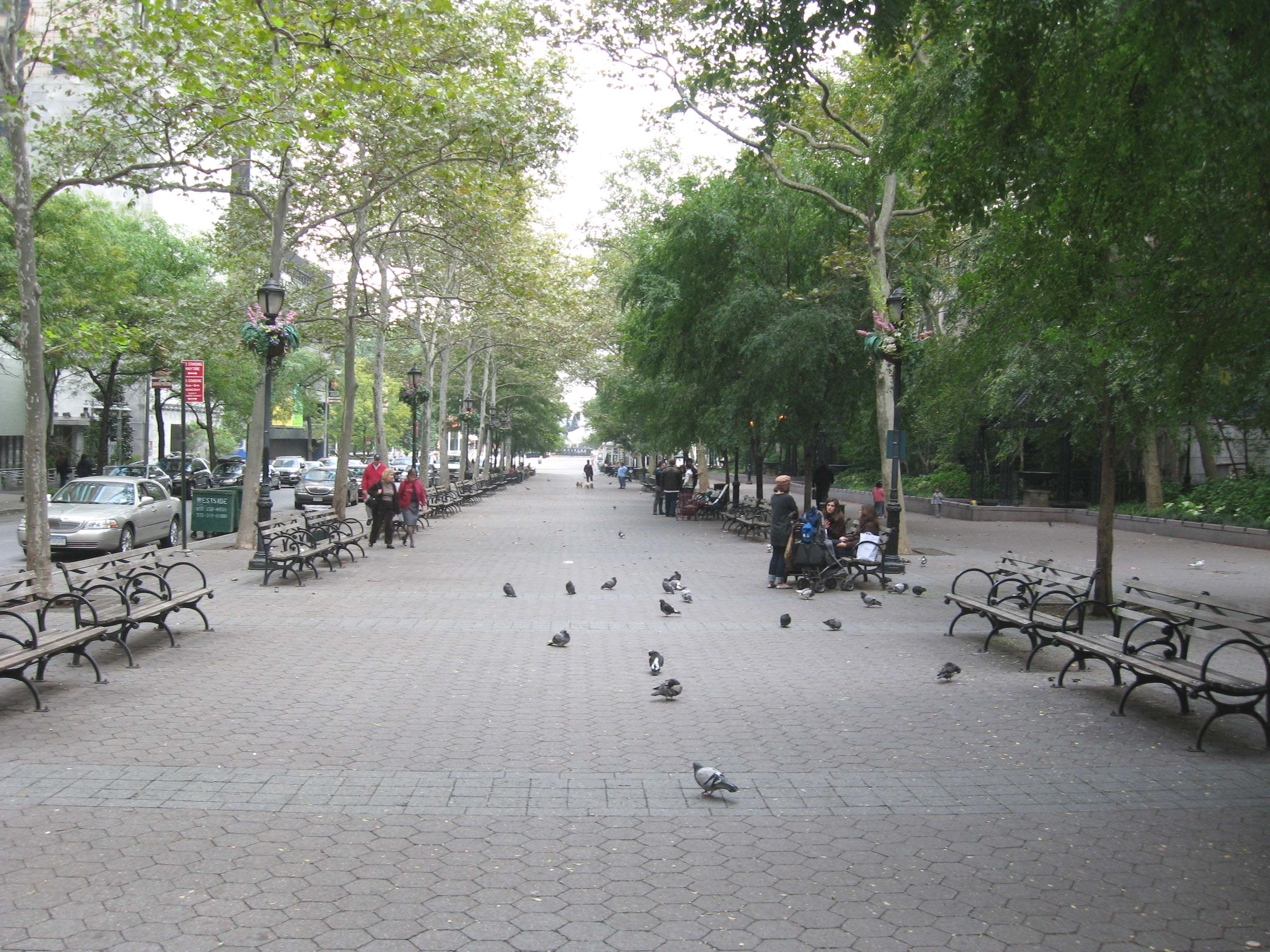
- Dag Hammarskjöld Plaza, located at the east end of 47th Street
- Maintained by: NYCDOT
- Length: 1.8 mi (2.9 km)
- Location: Manhattan
- Postal code: 10036, 10167, 10017
- Nearest metro station: 47th–50th Streets
- Coordinates: 40.7586°N 73.9832°W
- West end: NY 9A (12th Avenue) in Hell's Kitchen
- East end: First Avenue in Midtown East
- North: 48th Street
- South: 46th Street

Construction
- Commissioned: March 1811

47th Street is an east–west street in Midtown Manhattan, running between First Avenue and the West Side Highway (bisecting Times Square). Traffic runs one way along the street, from east to west, starting at the headquarters of the United Nations. The street includes Manhattan's Diamond District, which lies between Fifth and Sixth Avenues; this section of the street is also known as Diamond Jewelry Way.

== Notable locations ==
- Dag Hammarskjöld Plaza is a park on the south side of 47th Street between First and Second Avenues.
- The Factory was Andy Warhol's original New York City studio from 1963 to 1968, although his later studios were known as The Factory as well. The Factory was located on the fifth floor at 231 East 47th Street, between Second Avenue and Third Avenue.
- The top duplex of the Dyckman's Jewelry Exchange at 73 West 47th Street was Russian emigrant artist Alexander Ney's studio and home for four decades (1974–2015) following his immigration from the Soviet Union.
- After opening in 1920 on West 45th Street, the Gotham Book Mart later moved to 51 West 47th Street and then spent many years at 41 West 47th Street before moving to 16 East 46th Street.
- Vanderbilt Avenue is a short street that runs from 42nd Street to 47th Street, between Park Avenue and Madison Avenue. The street was built as the result of construction of Grand Central Terminal, and is named for the family of the terminal's original owners, Cornelius Vanderbilt. Grand Central Terminal can be accessed via 47th Street through the "Northwest Passage", a 1,000-foot (300 m)-long corridor that runs parallel to the tracks, connecting to the Main Concourse by way of an entrance at the northeast corner of East 47th Street and Madison Avenue.
- The portion of 47th Street between Fifth Avenue and Sixth Avenue is known as the Diamond District, which hosts a kosher cafe, the IDT Megabite Cafe.
- An NHL store stands at 1185 Sixth Avenue (Avenue of the Americas) between West 46th Street and West 47th Street. It is the only one of its kind in the country and has its own Starbucks within the store.
- The TKTS booth, reconstructed and reopened in 2008, is located on 47th Street at Duffy Square, between Seventh Avenue and Broadway. Theater-goers may purchase Broadway theatre tickets at a discount of 25 to 50% for listed plays and musicals on the day of the shows. The Morgan Stanley Building is located diagonally opposite to TKTS at Broadway and 47th Street.
- There are four active Broadway theaters on West 47th Street between Sixth Avenue and Eighth Avenue: the Palace Theatre at the southeast corner of Broadway and 47th Street; the Ethel Barrymore Theatre at 243 West 47th Street; the Lena Horne Theatre, formerly the Brooks Atkinson Theatre, at 256 West 47th Street; and the Samuel J. Friedman Theatre, formerly the Biltmore Theatre, at 261 West 47th Street.

=== Diamond District ===
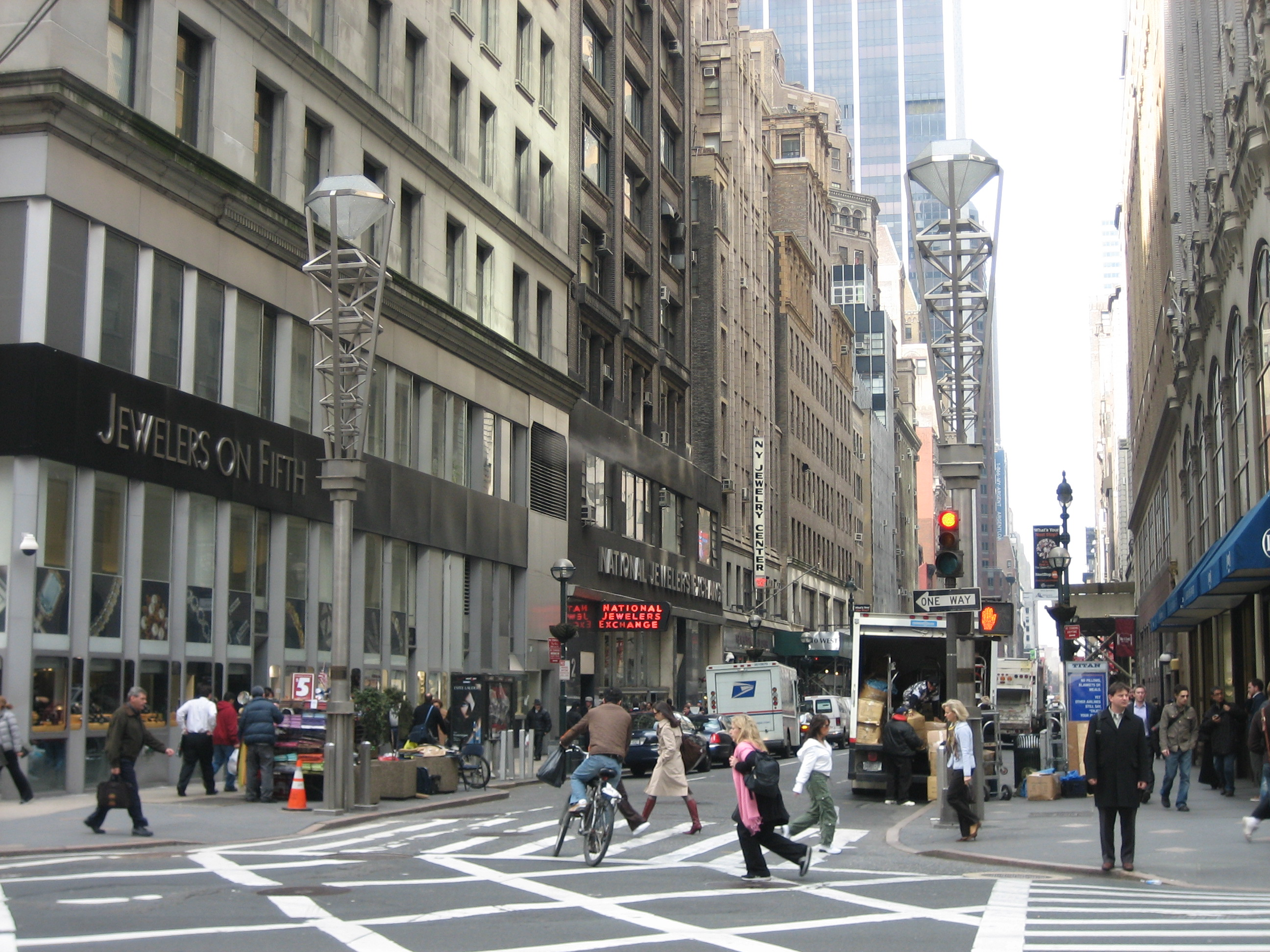
The Diamond District at 47th Street and Fifth Avenue

The Diamond District is a commercial stretch containing a series of jewellers' shops. The new Diamond District was formed when dealers moved north from an earlier district near Canal Street and the Bowery, created in the 1920s, and from a second district located in the Financial District, near the intersection of Fulton and Nassau streets, which started in 1931, and also from the one-time jewelry district of Maiden Lane, which had existed since the 18th century.

A notable, long-time anomaly of the district was the famous Gotham Book Mart, a bookstore, which was located at 41 West 47th Street from 1946 to 2004.

The move uptown started in the 1920s when rents in Maiden Lane began increasing drastically as finance and insurance companies moved into the Financial District. The district grew in importance when Nazi Germany invaded the Netherlands and Belgium, forcing thousands of Orthodox Jews in the diamond business to flee Amsterdam and Antwerp and settle in New York City. Most of them remained after World War II, and remain a dominant influence in the Diamond District. In 1941, the Diamond Dealers Club moved from Lower Manhattan to 36-38 West 47th Street. The organization, founded in 1931, brought together diamond merchants and helped establish the street as a major trading center.

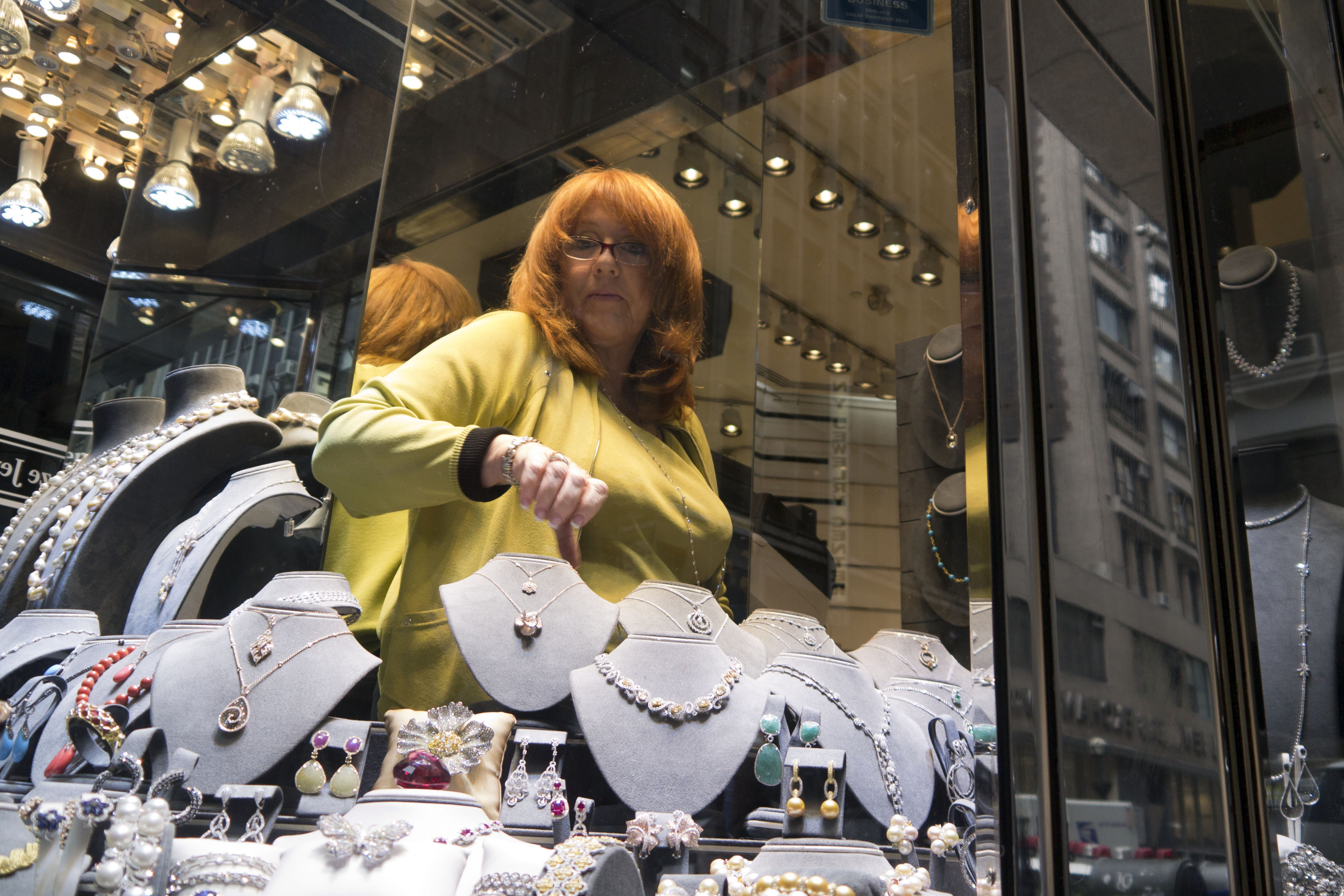
A jewelry shop in the Diamond District

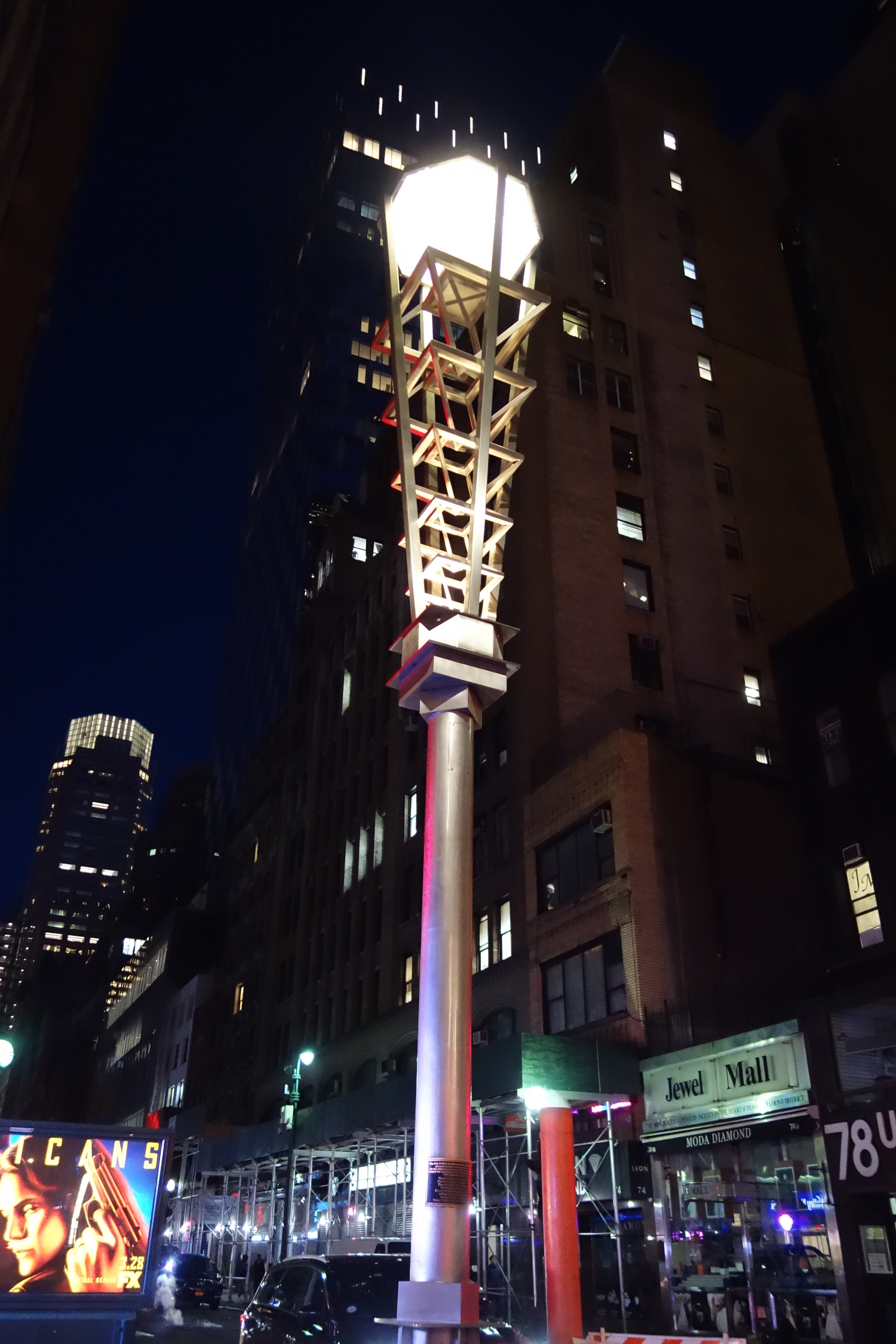
One of the unique diamond-shaped streetlights in the Diamond District

The area is one of the global hubs of the diamond business, as well as the premier center for jewelry shopping in the city. It is one of the largest diamond and jewelry districts in the United States, along with Jewelers' Row, Philadelphia and Los Angeles's Jewelry District, and it is the second oldest surviving jewelry district in the United States after Jewelers' Row in Philadelphia. Total receipts for the value of a single day's trade on the block average $400 million, while annual sales amount to approximately $24 billion.

An estimated 90% of diamonds in the United States enter through New York. There were some 3,500 independent businesses (cutting, polishing and sales) in the district in 2019. According to other sources, the district was home to more than 2,600 businesses in 2020, a majority of them were on the same block, many shop owners and managers of the district were Orthodox Jews. The wholesale business made up most of the $24.6 billion in annual sales in 2019. The industry employed 33,000 people, still predominantly Jews. Most businesses are located in booths at one of the 25 "exchanges" in the district. Commission based hawkers are a common sight and they usually solicit business for stores located on the street level.

According to The New York Times, the Diamond District has maintained a thriving, bazaarlike marketplace since the 1920s. Many deals are finalized by a simple, traditional blessing (mazel und brucha, which mean "luck and blessing" in Yiddish) and handshake. Retailers with shops line the streets outside. At 50 West 47th Street is the Gemological Institute of America which trains gem dealers. One distinguishing figure of the district is the diamond-motif street lights illuminating the corners. The NYC Diamond District holds three prominent trade interconnected buildings: the 580 Fifth Avenue Exchange, the DDC, Diamond Dealers Club, and the International Gem Tower. It is close to other landmarks such as Rockefeller Center and Radio City Music Hall.

A January 2020 article in Smithsonian magazine described the Diamond District as follows:

"Visit 47th Street today, and the stylish pedestrians of Fifth and Sixth Avenues vanish. In their place are elderly, ultra-Orthodox Jews wearing black overcoats and fedoras; south and central Asians with traditional karakul hats; and gaggles of merchants shouting in languages from across the world ... Forty-seventh Street is, in fact, a thick network of middlemen, with diamantaires buying and selling large caches of diamonds much like stock brokers..."

== Transportation ==
The New York City Subway's 47th–50th Streets – Rockefeller Center station on the IND Sixth Avenue Line offers service on the B, D, F, <F>, and M services. An underground concourse connects the station with the buildings of Rockefeller Center. The 49th Street station on the BMT Broadway Line offers service on the N, Q, R, and W trains, and is accessible via a part-time booth at Seventh Avenue and 47th Street at the south end of the station.

Several New York City Bus routes running along north-south avenues stop near the street.

== In popular culture ==
- The Velvet Underground song "Run Run Run" (1967), written by Lou Reed, talks about different characters who buy or take drugs in New York: "Beardless Harry, what a waste / Couldn't even get a small town taste / Rode the trolleys down to forty seven / Figured he was good to get himself to heaven".
- Seen in the John Schlesinger film Marathon Man (1976) with Laurence Olivier and Dustin Hoffman.
- One of the starting rounds of the arcade game Cadillacs and Dinosaurs (1992) portraits a rundown 47th Street in a flooded 26th-century New York.
- West 47th Street, co-produced by Bill Lichtenstein and June Peoples, was the title of a PBS documentary that debuted on P.O.V. in August 2003. The documentary focused on the mentally ill who inhabit the streets and was filmed over three years at Fountain House, a renowned 50-year-old rehabilitation center on West 47th Street.
- Seen in the closing scene of the Mike Nichols film Closer (2004), starring Natalie Portman and Jude Law.
- The 47th Street Diamond Exchange was featured in the 2009 film New York, I Love You in a segment with Natalie Portman and Irrfan Khan.
- Cardi B references the Diamond District in her 2018 single "I Like It" with Bad Bunny and J Balvin.
- The Safdie Brothers film Uncut Gems (2019) starring Adam Sandler follows the story of a Jewish jeweler with a shop in the Diamond District.
