= Lescaze House =

House in Manhattan, New York

- U.S. National Register of Historic Places
- New York State Register of Historic Places
- New York City Landmark
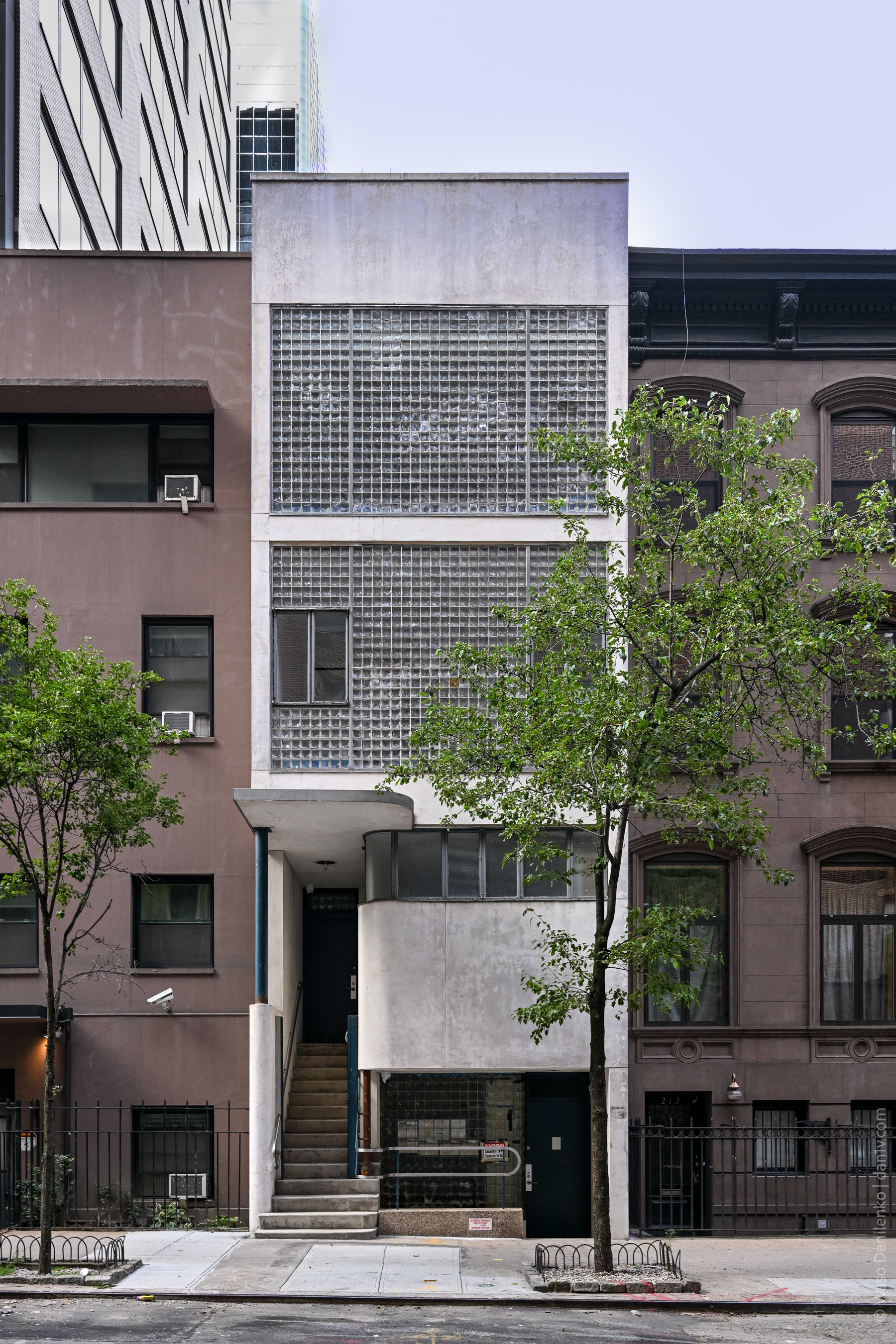
- The street facade in 2025
- Location: 211 E. 48th St., New York City
- Coordinates: 40°45′15.9″N 73°58′15.1″W
- Built: 1933–1934
- Architect: William Lescaze
- NRHP reference No.: 80002698
- NYSRHP No.: 06101.000630
- NYCL No.: 0898

Significant dates
- Added to NRHP: 1980-05-19
- Designated NYSRHP: 1980-06-23
- Designated NYCL: 1976-01-27

The Lescaze House is a four-story house at 211 East 48th Street in the East Midtown and Turtle Bay neighborhoods of Manhattan in New York City. It is along the northern sidewalk of 48th Street between Second Avenue and Third Avenue. The building was designed by William Lescaze in the International Style between 1933 and 1934 as a renovation of a 19th-century brownstone townhouse. It is one of three houses in Manhattan designed by Lescaze.

The four-story building contains a facade of white-painted stucco blocks and glass block windows. The glass blocks, the first to be used on a building in New York City, were installed to provide insulation and privacy while also allowing illumination. The house was designed to accommodate his office at the bottom and his family's residence on the upper floors. The Lescaze House was designed with a dining room at the first story, bedrooms on the second story, and a living room on the third story, as well as a basement and first-story annex in the back yard. Lescaze designed much of the furniture for his residence.

William Lescaze and his wife Mary moved into the house in June 1934. Their son Lee Lescaze, in his adulthood, also moved his own family into the neighboring rowhouse at 209 East 48th Street. After William Lescaze's death in 1969, Mary continued to maintain the property. The New York City Landmarks Preservation Commission designated the Lescaze House as an official landmark in 1976, and the house was added to the National Register of Historic Places in 1980. The house was sold in 1985 to the William Kaufman Organization, which conducted renovations but largely maintained the house's historic design. In 2020, the house was sold again to Hendale LLC.

== Site ==
The Lescaze House is at 211 East 48th Street in the East Midtown and Turtle Bay neighborhoods of Manhattan in New York City. It is along the northern sidewalk of 48th Street between Second Avenue and Third Avenue. The house has a frontage of 16.58 feet (5.05 m) along 48th Street. The land lot has an area of 1,666 square feet (154.8 m^{2}) and a depth of 100 feet (30 m). Nearby buildings include Turtle Bay Gardens to the east, as well as Amster Yard and the Morris B. Sanders Studio & Apartment to the north.

Numerous masonry houses with brick or brownstone facades were developed in Turtle Bay starting in the 1860s. These buildings usually occupied land lots that were at most 20 feet (6.1 m) wide and had classically inspired design features such as cornices and porticos. In the early 20th century, some of these houses were renovated with new interiors or exteriors. By then, a large portion of Turtle Bay's population was involved in the arts or architecture, and structures such as the Beaux-Arts Institute of Design and the residential Turtle Bay Gardens and Beaux-Arts Apartments were constructed for this community.

== Architecture ==
The Lescaze House was designed by William Lescaze in the International Style between 1933 and 1934. The house is a redesign of an Italianate-style brownstone residence, constructed in 1865 by Elias and Daniel Herbert as part of a row of brownstone residences on the same block. It is among New York City's few remaining structures designed by architects or artists as their own residences. The house accommodated Lescaze's office at the bottom and his family's residence on the upper floors.

The Lescaze House was the first building in the city to use a facade of glass blocks, although Lescaze claimed it was the first such structure in the United States. The house was characterized by later owner Sage Realty as "the first modernist house in New York City". It is one of only three houses designed by Lescaze in Manhattan, all of which share a similar style. The other two are at 124 East 70th Street and 32 East 74th Street, both on the Upper East Side. The design of the Lescaze House inspired businessman Raymond C. Kramer to hire Lescaze to design the 74th Street property in a similar style.

The Lescaze House was characterized by Ada Louise Huxtable in 1961 as "still extraordinarily contemporary after more than twenty-five years". Steve Dougherty, writing for The New York Times in 2002, stated that the "house puts the much more recent buildings nearby to shame". Architectural writer Robert A. M. Stern wrote that the use of glass blocks became "not only a trademark of his personal style but also a symbol of high-style Modernism throughout the 1930s". However, Lewis Mumford objected to the extension of the house into the rear yard, saying: "When architecture forgets the necessity of open spaces, it moves one step forward and two backward, no matter how 'modern' its design." Despite this, Mumford called the house "a very useful piece of individual pioneering".

=== Facade ===
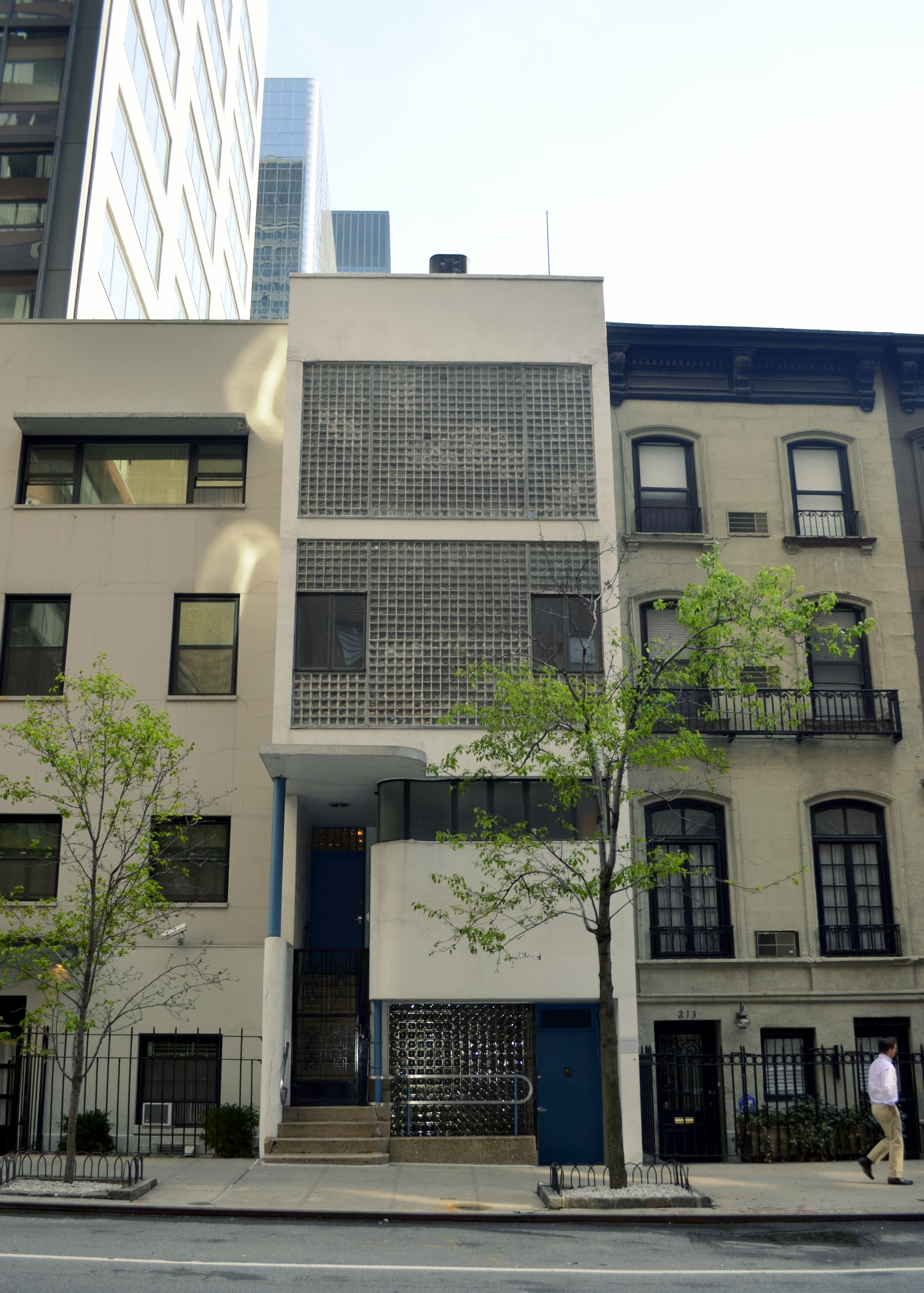
Front view of the facade

The front facade on 48th Street was pulled forward to the building line. Separate entrances were provided for the office, at the English basement slightly below ground level, and the residence, above ground level at the first story. (Note: Architectural Forum 1934, Turett Collaborative 2021, and the interior description of National Park Service 1980, p. 2, consider the residential floors as the first through third floors. However, Landmarks Preservation Commission 1976, pp. 3–4, as well as the exterior description of National Park Service 1980, p. 2, consider the residential floors as the second through fourth floors.) The entrances are grouped under a projecting porch supported by one Lally column. A short flight of steps at the center of the facade led down to Lescaze's office. The entrance was recessed to the lot line of the original 1865 brownstone. The office itself had a wall of glass blocks that separated it from the street, providing privacy while still letting sunlight in. On the left side of the house, a stoop leads up to the Lescaze family's main residence on the first floor. The stoop was retained from the original brownstone design.

The second and third floors of the front facade are nearly identical, with large glass-block windows across almost the full width of each floor. The hollow glass blocks measure 5-by-5-inch (130 mm × 130 mm) across and 2.5 inches (64 mm) thick. The glass block wall on the third floor lit the living room, but had no movable windows, as the top floor had air conditioning. The living room's glass wall is the largest in the house, with 680 glass blocks. The guest room at the front of the second floor had no air conditioning, so the glass block walls were fitted with two movable windows. The master bedroom at the rear of the second floor is slightly curved outward in an "S" shape.

The glass blocks on the facade were made by the Macbeth-Evans Glass Company. The glass blocks served to reduce heat, provide privacy, and allow light to pass through. Translucent glass blocks were used at the front of the second-floor bedroom and third-floor living room. The first-floor kitchen, as well as the rear, used transparent blocks because these rooms did not need as much privacy. At night, when the Lescaze family turned on the lights, the glass block facade appeared to be illuminated. According to Architectural Forum, this allowed the facade to be "at night as frankly expressive of the life within as it is by day". The Lescaze House's glass block exterior inspired the use of the material on nearby structures, such as the Morris Sanders Studios and 212 East 49th Street one block north.

=== Interior ===
As of 2018, the building has 7,000 square feet (650 m^{2}) of floor area. Lescaze designed the interior with a neutral color palette that reflected sunlight. The design was meant to let in large amounts of light given the building's small width. Lescaze also made custom furniture and furnishings for his residence. These furnishings included a dining room that contained metal-tube chairs with upholstery, a rosewood table, and walls with two hues of gray paint. Additionally, chenille curtains were used for the windows, while the floors were made of gray rubber padding. The house was the city's first private residence with central air conditioning. Indirect lighting was also used throughout the house. The interior originally used a color scheme with various hues of yellow, blue, gray, and white.

At the front of the basement office was a reception room that originally contained a counter. The reception room had a plaster ceiling with sound-absorbing tiles. Behind the reception room was a bathroom, storage room, and a studio on the left side of the office, all connected by a corridor on the left side. Below the basement, there is a cellar that had storage and a mechanical room.

On the first floor is an eat-in kitchen at the front of the residence, as well as an office (formerly a dining room) at the rear. On the second story are two offices, which consist of the former guest room at the front and the former master bedroom at the rear. The third story contains the living room. The living room has a fireplace with refractory bricks. The living room was originally entirely illuminated by indirect lighting and contained a skylight at the center of its ceiling. As of 2021, the living room was being split into a family room in the front and a bedroom in the rear. A fourth story was proposed to be added atop the living room, with a lounge in the front and a guest bedroom in the rear. In Lescaze's original design, a narrow staircase with a wooden railing connected all of the stories. A hydraulic elevator also connects each story. In 2021, the elevator was proposed to be extended upward to the fourth floor.

The basement and first floor are extended at the house's rear into part of what was originally the garden. The annex stories are slightly raised above the main house's stories. Within the annex at basement level, a stair led up to the library in the annex's basement and led down to another studio in the annex's cellar. At the first story, a roof terrace was installed above this addition to offset the loss of part of the rear yard. The roof doubled as a sundeck. Outside the dining room at the rear of the first story, is a patio with a short flight of stairs leading up to the annex's roof terrace. The balcony and roof terrace both contained glass-tile floors on its roof to illuminate the rooms below. These glass tiles are made of solid blocks for strength. In 2021, the skylights were proposed for cleaning, and the rear yard was proposed to be lowered to the annex's cellar.

== History ==
William Lescaze was born in Onex, Switzerland, near Geneva, in 1896. He received his diploma from the Swiss Federal Institute of Technology in Zurich in 1919 and founded his business in New York City in 1923. Lescaze partnered with George Howe to design structures such as Philadelphia's PSFS Building, an early International Style skyscraper. Just after buying the 211 East 48th Street brownstone in 1933, Lescaze married Mary Connick Hughes.

=== Lescaze family ownership ===
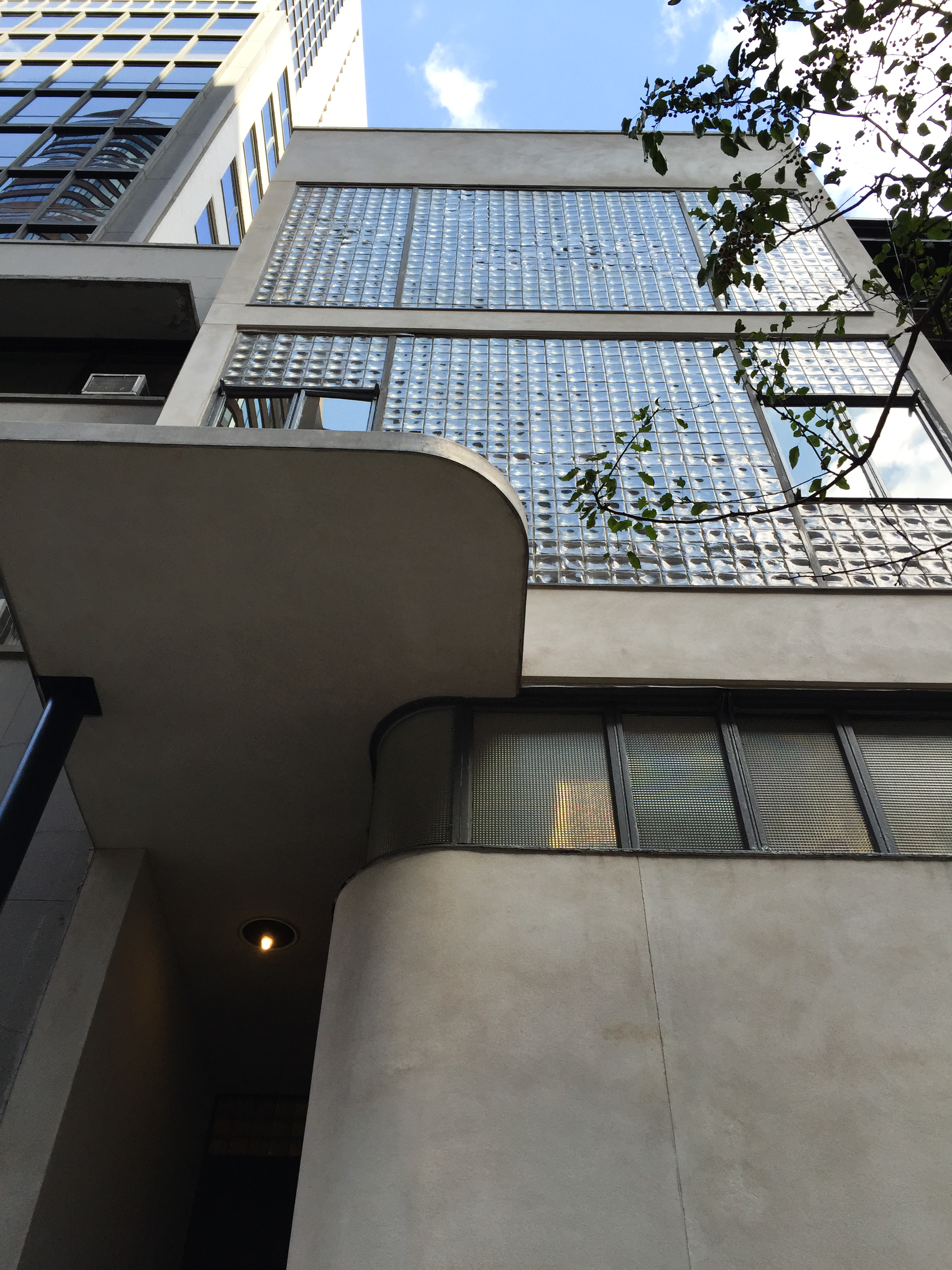
View of the facade from the sidewalk

In August 1933, William Lescaze submitted plans to the New York City Department of Buildings for a modification to the 19th-century brownstone at 211 East 48th Street. The four-story brownstone townhouse had been classified as a single-family home, but Lescaze proposed converting the basement to commercial use, retaining the first through third floors as a residence. Lescaze's original plans called for central air-conditioning. Due to objections over the proposed zoning of the building, the city government rejected Lescaze's initial proposals to modify the house. Lescaze resubmitted his plans for his house in December 1933 and, in an amendment the next month, clarified that the glass-block windows would enable ventilation and air-conditioning equipment to be installed. The glass block tiles were delivered to the house but stayed on the sidewalk until the building department approved the revised plans in February 1934. The Lescaze family moved into the house in June 1934.

The design of the Lescaze House inspired similar renovations to other structures in the neighborhood, including four townhouses on 49th Street in the 1930s and 1940s. The Lescaze House initially attracted so much attention that, according to the Associated Press, William and Mary Lescaze "had about as much privacy as a traffic cop". The couple agreed to invite passersby to look at the house for one hour each Monday. They then left a servant to tend to the house every Monday while they traveled elsewhere. Despite this, Mary Lescaze said the couple was not afraid of stone-throwers, as "the stones will simply rattle off". The couple's only son, Lee Lescaze, was born in 1938 and grew up in the house. In Lee Lescaze's adulthood, his father renovated the adjacent brownstone at 209 East 48th Street for Lee's family. The two houses were connected at their third stories.

William Lescaze died of a heart attack at his house in 1969, at the age of seventy-two. Following his death, his wife Mary continued to maintain the house in largely its original condition. On January 27, 1976, the New York City Landmarks Preservation Commission (LPC) designated the Lescaze House as a New York City landmark. The building was added to the National Register of Historic Places on May 19, 1980. Lescaze's family continued to own the house for sixteen years after his death. The William Kaufman Organization acquired the Lescaze House and the adjacent property at 209 East 48th Street in 1985.

=== Later ownership ===
Melvyn and Robert Kaufman, the subsequent owners of the house, were looking for a tenant by 2001. Although the glass blocks used in the windows were no longer being manufactured, the LPC insisted that any replacements be to the same specifications as the original design. According to a spokesman for SageGroupAssociates (later Sage Realty), which leased property on behalf of the Kaufman Organization, a Pennsylvania studio had agreed to make replicas of the glass blocks. Sage completely renovated the Lescaze House sometime before 2011. By 2015, the building contained both a residence and a commercial unit. According to Gothamist, representatives of Sage researched the house's history before making modifications. Some time afterward, the 48th Street facade was restored to its original appearance; the stucco was painted and glass blocks were installed to Lescaze's original specifications. The interior was renovated with a new hydraulic elevator and a contemporary-style kitchen.

In 2018, after renovating the house, Sage Realty placed the building on sale for nearly $5 million. Sage also separately placed the adjacent structures at 209 East 48th Street and 210 East 49th Street for sale. The three buildings were worth almost $15 million combined and were sold separately. 211 East 48th Street was the last of the structures to be sold, when Hendale LLC purchased it for $3.8 million in March 2020. The following January, architecture firm Turett Collaborative submitted renovation plans for the Lescaze House to the LPC. The company proposed repairing the exterior, consolidating mechanical equipment on the roof, and excavating the rear yard.

== See also ==
- List of New York City Designated Landmarks in Manhattan from 14th to 59th Streets
- National Register of Historic Places listings in Manhattan from 14th to 59th Streets
