= Lescaze =

Lescaze is a surname. Notable people with the surname include:

- Lee Lescaze (1938–1996), American journalist
- William Lescaze (1896–1969), American architect
