= Sun Terrace =

Historic house in Connecticut, United States

- U.S. National Register of Historic Places
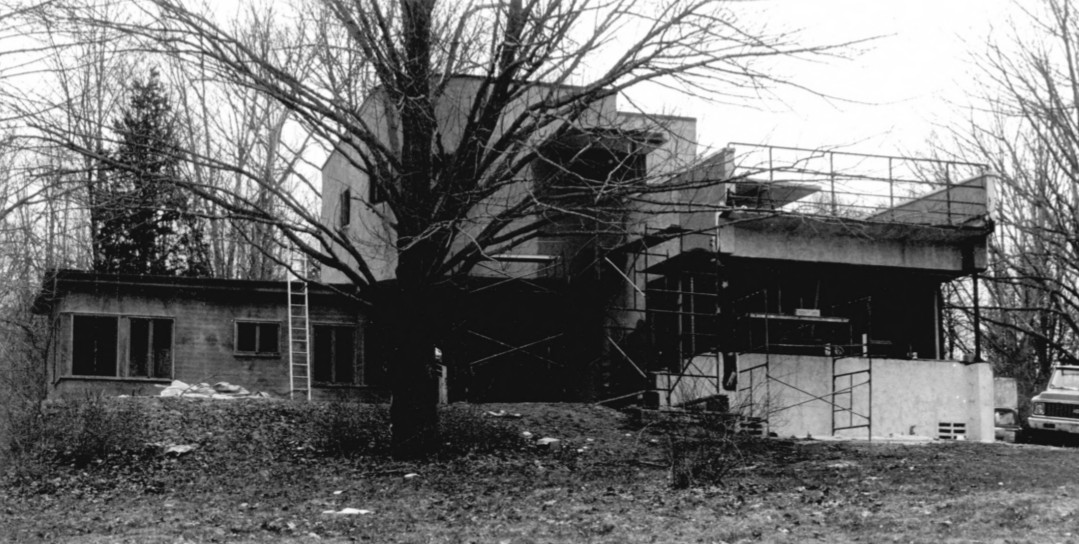
- Sun Terrace, 1978

- Location within Connecticut Location within the United States
- Location: Stub Hollow Road, New Hartford, Connecticut
- Coordinates: 41°51′15″N 73°0′47″W
- Area: 7.9 acres (3.2 ha)
- Built: 1929
- Architect: William E. Lescaze
- Architectural style: International Style
- NRHP reference No.: 78002849
- Added to NRHP: December 20, 1978

Sun Terrace, also known as the Field House, is a historic house on Stub Hollow Road in New Hartford, Connecticut. Commissioned in 1929 for a scion of the Vanderbilt family and completed in 1932, it is the first successful residential commission of William Lescaze, and the first documented example in the United States of an International Style country house. It was listed on the National Register of Historic Places in 1978.

== Description and history ==
Sun Terrace is located in an isolated rural setting near the geographic center of New Hartford. It is set on a wooded ridge southwest of the town center, its east flank traversed by Stub Hollow Road. The house is set at the crest of the ridge, with expansive views to the west and southwest. It is a 1 1/2-story structure, with a frame of steel finished with cement stucco. It is an asymmetrical but roughly rectangular mass, with a flat roof, cantilevered decks, and a prominent curved wall section. It has grouped windows, including at some of its corners, and is generally devoid of exterior ornamentation. A spiral staircase provides access between the rooftop terrace and lower outside spaces. Interior features include a curved soapstone fireplace, and extensive use of fluorescent lighting, a technology in its infancy at the time of the house's construction.

The house was commissioned from William Lescaze, a Swiss architect, in 1929 by Frederick Vanderbilt Field, a scion of the Vanderbilt family railroad fortune who was disinherited for his political views. Lescaze was at the time also designing the PSFS Building, the nation's first International style skyscraper. When completed, this house was the first country house of that style, being preceded in residential architecture only by the Lovell House of Richard Neutra.

== See also ==
- National Register of Historic Places listings in Litchfield County, Connecticut
