= Raymond C. and Mildred Kramer House =

House in Manhattan, New York

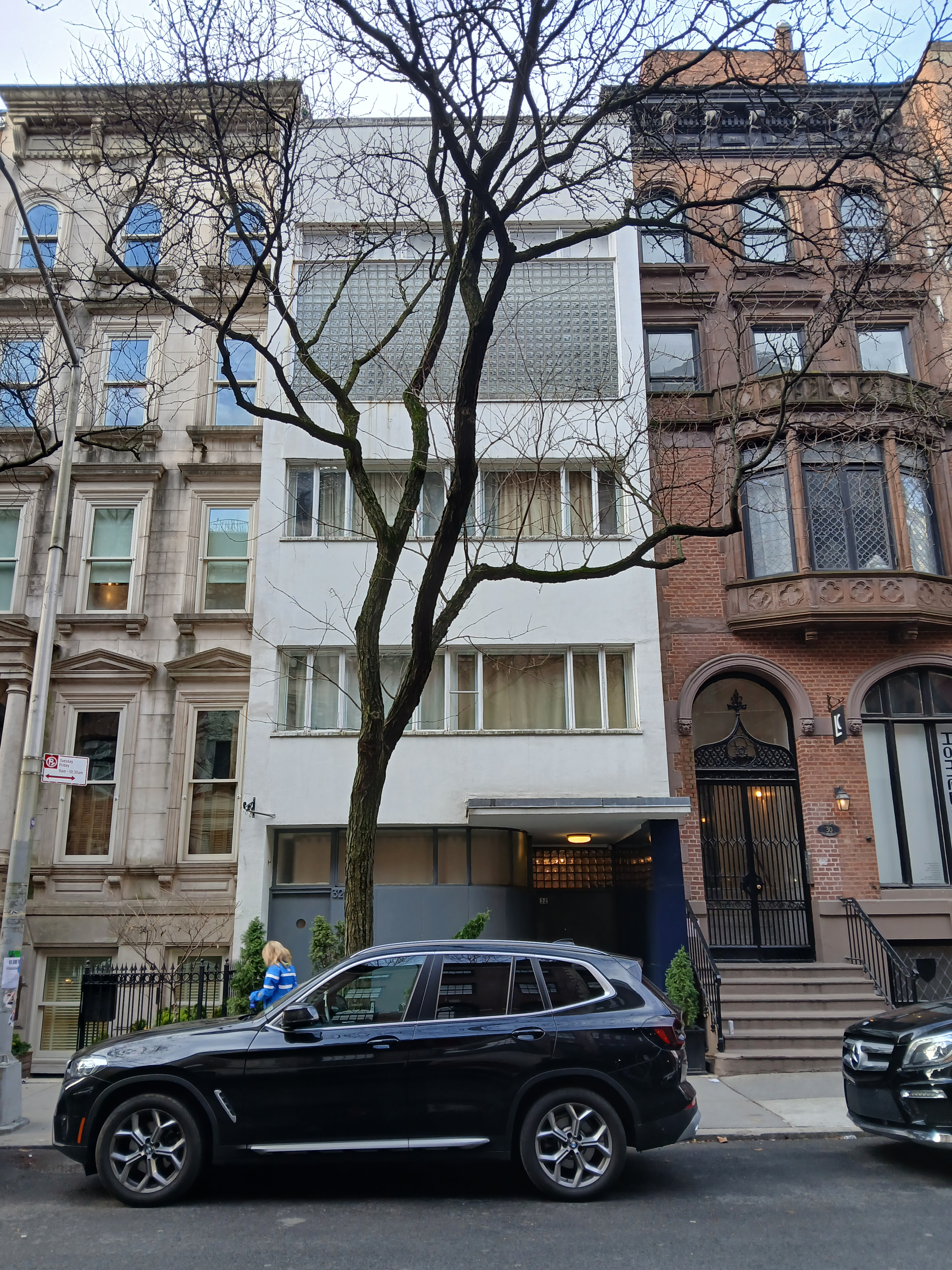
- Interactive map of the Raymond C. and Mildred Kramer House area
- Alternative names: 32 East 74th Street

General information
- Type: Townhouse
- Architectural style: Early Modern
- Location: 32 East 74th Street, Upper East Side, Manhattan, New York City, United States
- Coordinates: 40.7728°N 73.9641°W
- Construction started: 1934
- Completed: 1935

Technical details
- Floor area: 6,800 sq ft (630 m^{2})

Design and construction
- Architect: William Lescaze

The Raymond C. and Mildred Kramer House is an early Modern–style townhouse at 32 East 74th Street on the Upper East Side of Manhattan in New York City, New York, U.S. Developed from 1934 to 1935, the house was designed by William Lescaze for the merchant Raymond C. Kramer and his wife Mildred. After Mildred's death in 1969, the building was used as the Madagascar government's mission to the United Nations. The house was sold in 2015 and renovated, after which it was placed on sale again.

The townhouse is stylistically similar to the Lescaze House and Morris B. Sanders Apartment in Midtown Manhattan. Its facade is composed of glass blocks and frosted glass casement windows, white stucco, blue-enameled steel panels, a projecting marquee, and a curved, inset front entrance. The house has 6,800 square feet (630 m^{2}) of interior space. While the facade has been preserved over the years, the interior has been extensively modified.

== History ==
The house was designed by William Lescaze for the textile merchant and U.S. Colonel Raymond C. Kramer and his wife Mildred. Prior to the house's construction, the Kramers had lived at One Fifth Avenue. The Kramers decided to hire Lescaze after walking past the architect's own house, the Lescaze House, on 48th Street in the eastern section of Midtown Manhattan. In April 1934, the Trepur Realty Corporation sold a 20-by-102-foot (6.1 by 31.1 m) site at 32 East 74th Street, with the Worthington Whitehouse Company acting as the real-estate broker. Kramer was recorded as the owner. The existing structure on the site had been partially demolished to make way for a building for physicians, but the physicians' building had been canceled due to zoning restrictions. Lescaze and his partner George Howe submitted plans for the building to the New York City government in August 1934, and Kramer began constructing the house that month. It was one of fewer than six houses being built in Manhattan during that year due to the Great Depression.

The Kramer House was completed by January 1935. The 1940 United States census records the Kramers and two servants as having lived in the house; one of these servants was the house's longtime cook, Maria Warren. During the summers, the Kramers frequently stayed in their country estate instead. After air conditioning became more widespread, Mildred Kramer did not want to install air conditioners, fearing that they would ruin the house's exterior appearance. Raymond Kramer lived in the house until his death in 1957, as did Mildred until she died in 1969. Mildred's daughter and Raymond's stepdaughter, Jo Parrish Maloney, decided to sell the building to the government of Madagascar, who paid $290,000 for the house in January 1973, and the house was subsequently used as Madagascar's mission to the United Nations. The real estate agent Richard Steinberg said in 2010 that he then sold the house to a couple, then to a single woman.

The Kramer House was placed on sale in 2008, but no one offered to buy the building at the time, and it was again placed for sale two years later. Christopher Gray, writing for The New York Times in 2013, said that the house had deteriorated over the years. In particular, some of the facade's steel panels had rusted, and stucco was peeling off the facade. The house was ultimately sold in 2015 for $15.9 million, and the subsequent owner renovated it extensively, dividing it into three apartments. In December 2017, after renovation, the house was back on sale. The real estate agent who was marketing the Kramer House, Todd Vitolo, said in 2021 that he had received numerous calls from people who were interested in buying the house. The house still remained unsold by February 2025.

== Description ==
The Kramer House is located at 32 East 74th Street on the Upper East Side of Manhattan in New York City, New York, U.S. The townhouse is on the south side of the street between Park Avenue to the east and Madison Avenue to the west. Designed by William Lescaze, the building is an early example of modern architecture in New York City and one of three Lescaze designs in Manhattan. Stylistically, it is similar to Lescaze's 48th Street house and to the Morris B. Sanders Apartment near Lescaze's residence.

=== Exterior ===
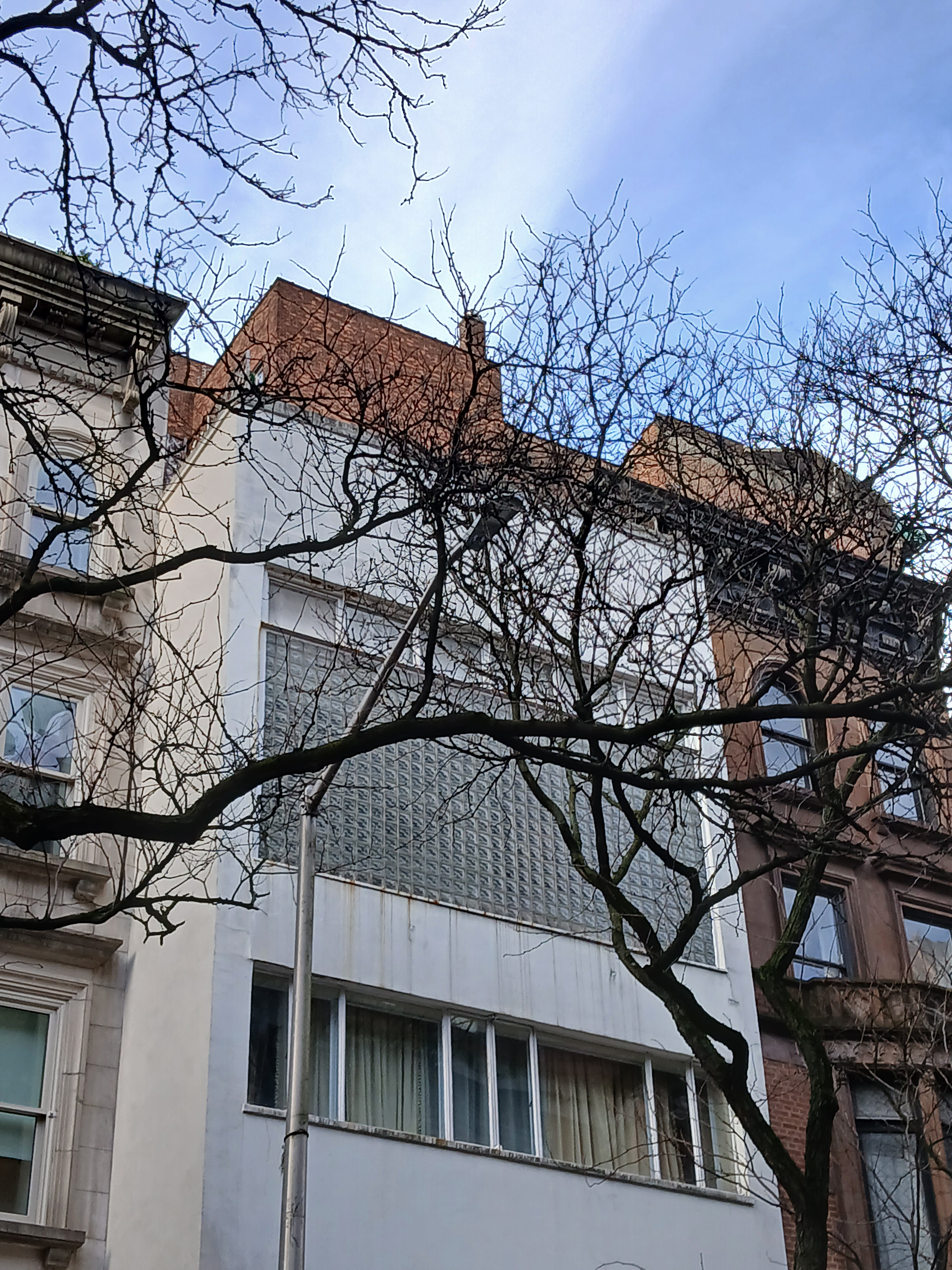
Detail of upper-story windows

As planned, the house was supposed to have a facade measuring 20 feet (6.1 m) wide and four stories high. The townhouse's facade is largely composed of glass blocks, frosted glass casement windows, and white stucco. This makes the building one of several glass-block structures on the Upper East Side. The first story is clad in blue-enameled steel panels, with a concrete marquee protruding 5 feet (1.5 m) above a curved, inset front entrance. The main doorway is to the right, and there is a recessed service doorway to the left. One of the walls is made of several types of glass. The glass walls were intended to provide soundproofing to the house while also illuminating the interiors. The house's curved rear facade has an asymmetrical cantilevered balcony; one article in The New York Observer wrote that the rear facade "undulates like a Gaudi-sculpted tsunami".

For the most part, the exterior of the building retains its original design. The 2010 edition of the AIA Guide to New York City described the building as "a handcrafted version of a machine aesthetic common to most Bauhaus-inspired design and architecture".

=== Interior ===
The house has 6,800 square feet (630 m^{2}) of interior space. When the house was built, it had beige, gray, and white interiors. The house originally had a large number of custom-designed, built-in pieces of furniture, including wooden shelves. The basement had a game room measuring 18 by 30 feet (5.5 by 9.1 m). The ground floor included a kitchen and dining room, as well as a terrace raised 6 feet (1.8 m) above the rear garden. The upper stories had five bedrooms and four bathrooms. The linen room and three of the bedrooms were on the second floor, while the other two bedrooms were on the third floor next to a library and sewing room. Mildred's grandson Scott Tower recalled that one of the third-floor rooms was used as an office for Mildred's assistant. The fourth floor included a living room measuring 18 by 50 feet (5.5 by 15.2 m), with a curved rear wall, a fireplace, and a sunroom at the front. All of the stories were connected by an elevator. Over the years, the original interiors have been extensively modified, and the original elevator was removed.

As of 2025, the building was subdivided into three duplex apartments, each accessed by an elevator; the current elevator was added during the 2010s renovation. There are three bedrooms (one of which has a terrace) and two-and-a-half bathrooms in the uppermost duplex. The middle duplex also has three bedrooms, an office, and three bathrooms. Within the lowermost duplex are two bedrooms (one of which abuts a patio) and two-and-a-half bathrooms. In total, this gives the house eight bedrooms and seven bathrooms. Each of the apartments has marble bathrooms and hardwood floors. In the basement is a winter garden, which is located below the house's actual garden. There is also a library on the top level, as well as a yoga room. A Curbed article from 2021 said that the house's interiors blended contemporary and neoclassical architectural elements, These features included balustrades, curtains with swag motifs, and wooden floors laid in herringbone patterns.

== See also ==
- Architecture of New York City
- Early American modernism
