= Williamsburg Houses =

Public housing development in Brooklyn, New York

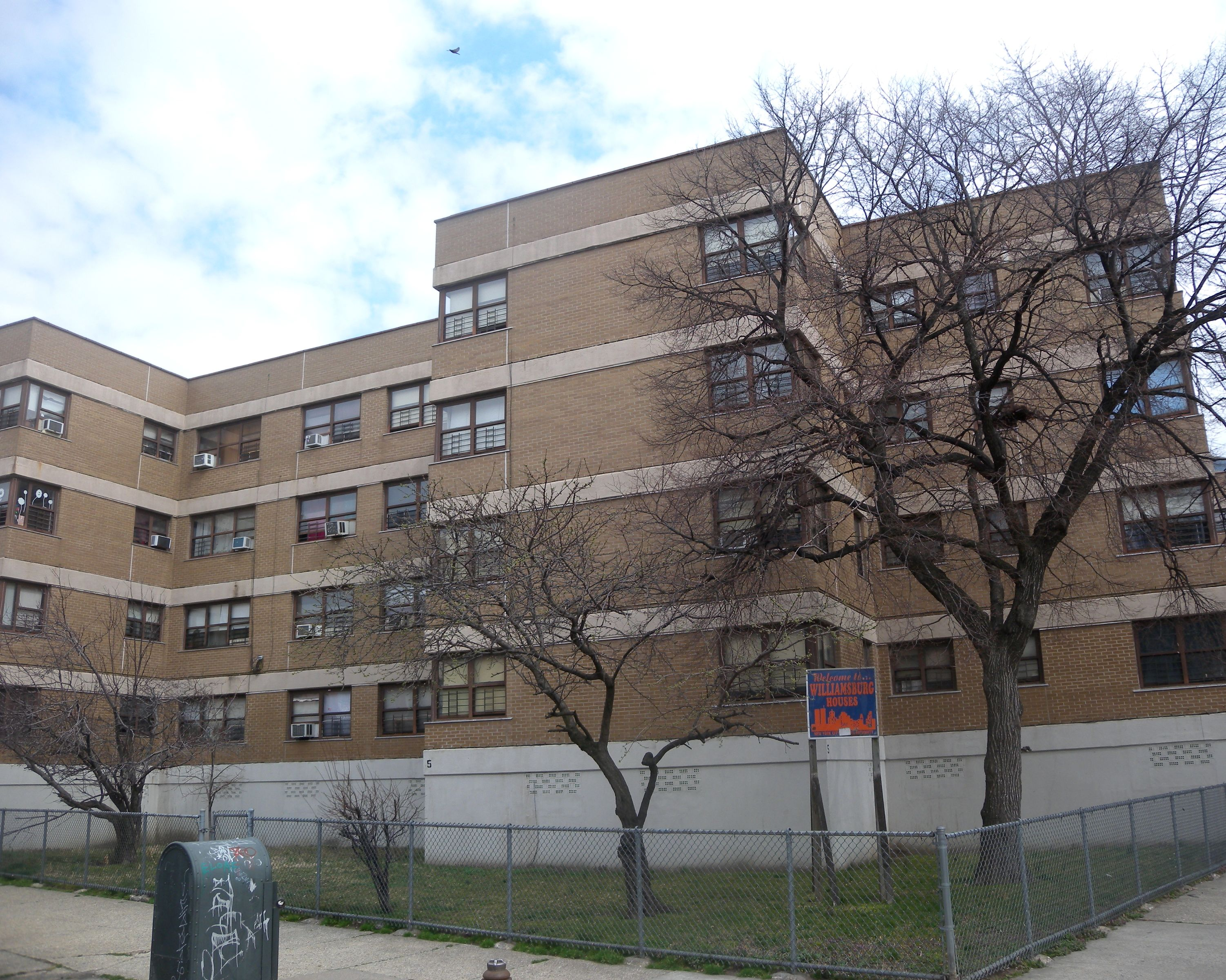
- Williamsburg Houses looking east on Leonard and Scholes Streets in 2012
- Former names: Ten Eyck Houses

General information
- Location: Brooklyn, New York City, United States
- Coordinates: 40°42′36″N 73°56′36″W
- Construction started: 1936
- Opened: April 10, 1938
- Cost: $12.5 million
- Owner: New York City Housing Authority

U.S. National Register of Historic Places
- Designated: April 22, 2021
- Reference no.: 100006484

New York City Landmark
- Designated: June 24, 2003
- Reference no.: 2135

The Williamsburg Houses, originally called the Ten Eyck Houses (pronounced TEN-IKE), is a public housing complex built and operated by the New York City Housing Authority (NYCHA), in the Williamsburg neighborhood of Brooklyn. It consists of 20 buildings on a site bordered by Scholes, Maujer, and Leonard Streets and Bushwick Avenue. The Williamsburg Houses were built in 1936–1938 under the auspices of the Housing Division of the Public Works Administration (PWA). Richmond Shreve was the chief architect of the project; the design team of nine other architects was led by the Swiss-American modernist William Lescaze. The construction contract was awarded to Starrett Brothers & Eken. The designs called for the inclusion of modern art commissioned through the Federal Arts Project.

The Williamsburg Houses were designated a New York City Landmark in 2003. They were added to the National Register of Historic Places in 2021.

Since December 28, 2021, NYCHA converted the housing development into Section 8 RAD PACT management in Public–private partnership leases with private real estate developers and companies named RDC Development and Wavecrest Management Group LLC as well as adding social service provider programs named St. Nicks Alliance Corp and Grand Street Settlement.

== Architecture ==
The project's chief architect was Richmond Shreve, and the design team of nine other architects was led by the Swiss-American modernist William Lescaze, whose PSFS Building of 1928–1932 was one of the first major International Style buildings in the United States. The construction contract was awarded to Starrett Brothers & Eken, which had worked closely with Shreve on the Empire State Building and later built the housing developments in Parkchester, Stuyvesant Town, and Peter Cooper Village.

=== Facade ===
The development is approximately 25 acres between Maujer, Scholes, Leonard Streets, and Bushwick Avenue. Its 20 four-story residential buildings occupy twelve city blocks. The buildings are positioned to allow a sequence of courtyards, playgrounds, and ball courts between them; a school and community building are part of the site plan, and two curving pedestrian pathways cut through the grounds. The buildings have one of three shapes, viewed from overhead: a capital "H," lowercase "h," and a "T" shape. The T-shaped buildings are in the middle of the complex, with both H-shaped buildings surrounding them. The houses are oriented towards the sun at a 15-degree angle. Each building has a light tan brick facade, and building entrances are marked by blue tiles and stainless steel canopies. Commercial storefronts run parallel to the streets and accompany apartment buildings throughout many locations. Although the materials are not historically accurate, the new elevations are similar to the originals. Between Maujer Street and Ten Eyck Walk, on either side of Graham Avenue, are the largest storefronts. Graham Avenue (near Scholes Street), Leonard Street (near Maujer Street), and Bushwick Avenue (between Maujer and Stagg Walk) all have smaller retail spaces.

=== Murals ===
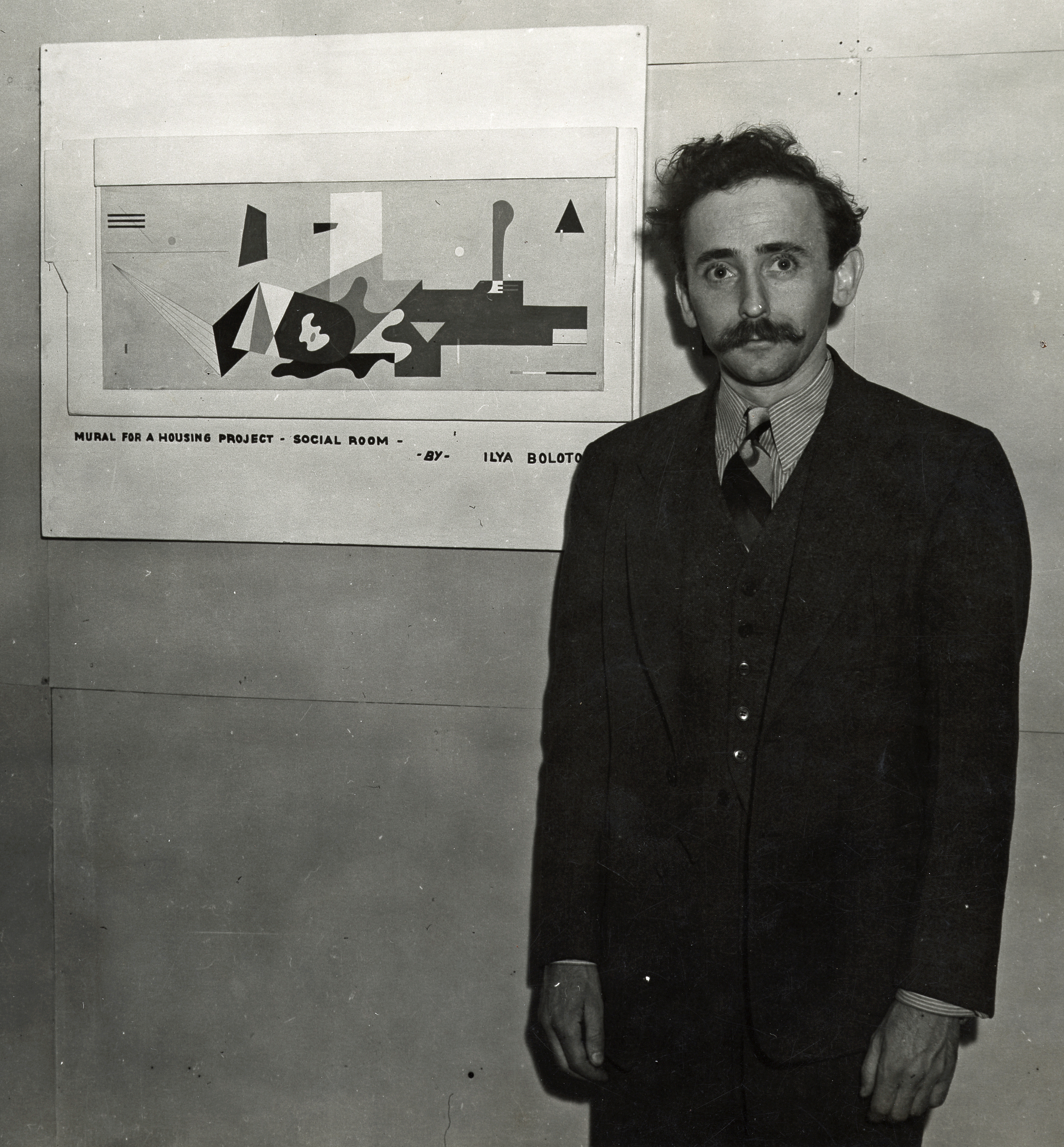
Ilya Bolotowsky (pictured in 1938) with his artwork.

Because of its innovative International Style design, the housing project designs called for the inclusion of modern art. Working with Lescaze, the NYC Federal Arts Project mural division, headed by abstract artist Burgoyne Diller, handled the commissions. Five abstract murals by Ilya Bolotowsky, Balcomb Greene, Paul Kelpe, and Albert Swinden were installed in basement meeting rooms in the late 1930s. These murals were rediscovered in the late 1980s after having been painted over for some time. After careful removal and restoration, the Williamsburg murals were installed at the Brooklyn Museum in 1990, where they remain on long-term loan from NYCHA.

Other artists received commissions for the project, but their murals were ultimately not used. Stuart Davis painted a large semi-abstract mural entitled Swing Landscape for the project, but the work was instead sold by the Federal Art Gallery in New York, eventually landing up at the Indiana University Art Museum. Francis Criss completed a 1938 oil-on-canvas mural called Sixth Avenue El, a realist abstraction of a Sixth Avenue El platform. The subject was timely, given that the elevated line was closed in late 1938 and razed in 1939. However, Criss's mural was never installed and now forms part of the Whitney Museum of American Art collection. According to Time magazine, it was rejected because the color scheme did not match the prescribed colors for the project.

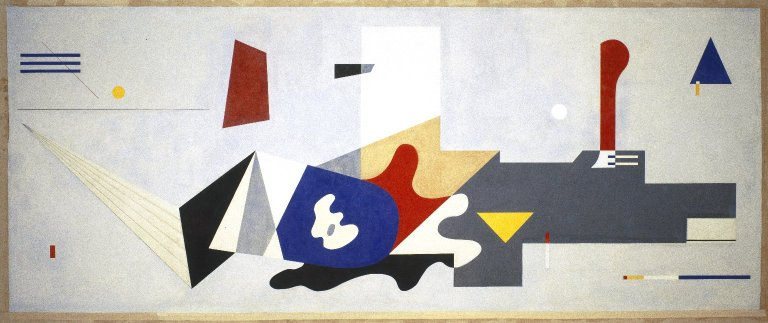
Bolotowsky mural recovered from Williamsburg Housing Project

Other artists engaged for the mural commissions were Jan Matulka, Byron Browne, George McNeil, Willem de Kooning, Harry Bowden, and Eugene Morley. Abstract sculptures, including work by Martin Craig and Jose de Rivera, were also part of the initial plans. The uncompleted murals and sculptures status has not been fully established.

== History ==
=== Construction ===
In 1935, 568 buildings were demolished on 349 lots to make space for construction, and approximately 5,400 residents were relocated. The population was divided equally between those born in the United States, those born in Italy, and others. Most were semi-skilled manufacturing workers, such as clerks, truck drivers, or construction workers. As the foundations were nearing completion, the PWA solicited construction bids. In October 1936, Starrett Brothers & Eken won a $7.5 million contract for the first 18 buildings.

=== Opening ===
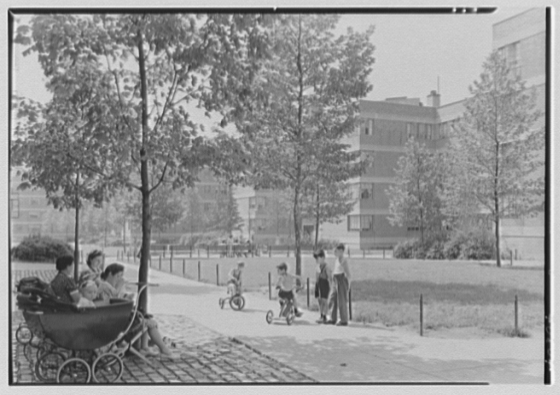
Williamsburg Houses seen in 1941

The Williamsburg Houses were built in 1936–1938 under the auspices of the Housing Division of the Public Works Administration (PWA). The project was originally segregated and allowed only white residents. It was one of the first and, at the time, the most expensive New York City housing project, costing $12.5 million. New York City Mayor Fiorello La Guardia was a strong supporter of the project; he even poured the first shovel of concrete when ground broke. The site formerly contained Williamsburg Continuation School and the Finco Dye and Print Works Inc.

The initial tenancy rents were set by WPA Secretary Ickes in August 1937, four months before the first tenants moved in. The building's commercial rents were also set, though, within six months, they were decreased by 50% to compete with cheaper rents in nearby tenements.

The federal government conveyed the housing developments to NYCHA in 1957. A $70-million-dollar renovation was done in 1999 by NYCHA architect David J. Burney.

== Notable people ==
- Rosie Mendez, New York City Council politician

== See also ==
- New York City Housing Authority
- List of New York City Housing Authority properties
