= 219 East 49th Street =

Building in Manhattan, New York

Morris B. Sanders Studio & Apartment
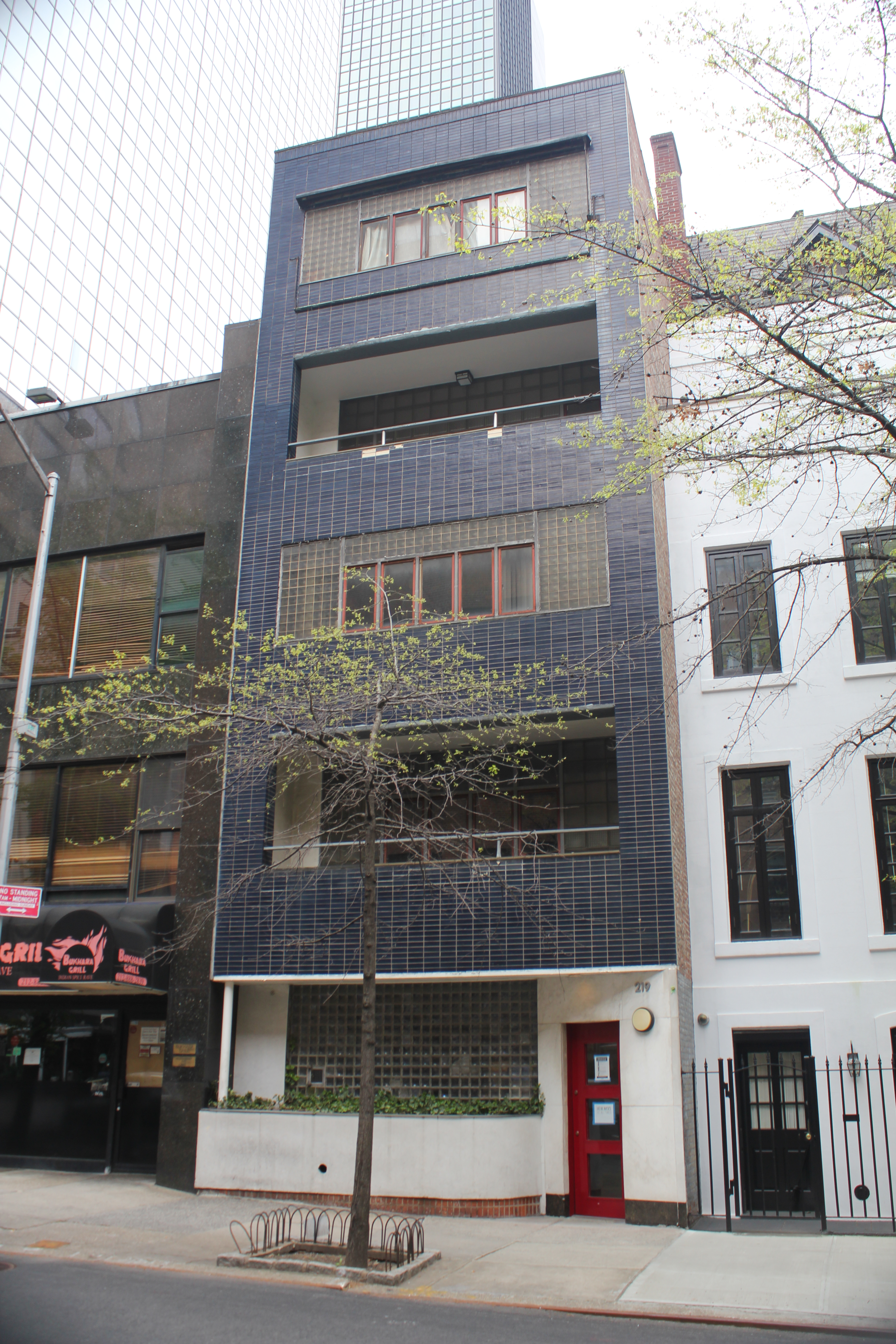
- The main facade of 219 East 49th Street, seen in April 2021
- Interactive map of the Morris B. Sanders Studio & Apartment area

General information
- Type: Residential
- Architectural style: Modernist
- Location: Manhattan, New York, US, 219 East 49th Street
- Coordinates: 40°45′18″N 73°58′13″W
- Construction started: March 1935
- Completed: December 1935

Technical details
- Material: Blue brick, glass block (facade)
- Floor count: 5 (front); 6 (rear)

Design and construction
- Architect: Morris B. Sanders

New York City Landmark
- Designated: November 18, 2008
- Reference no.: 2267

219 East 49th Street, also known as the Morris B. Sanders Studio & Apartment, is a building in the East Midtown and Turtle Bay neighborhoods of Manhattan in New York City, along the northern sidewalk of 49th Street between Second Avenue and Third Avenue. The house, designed by Arkansas architect Morris B. Sanders Jr. and constructed in 1935, replaced a 19th-century brownstone townhouse. It contained Sanders's studio, as well as a residence for him and his wife Barbara Castleton Davis.

The five-and-a-half-story building contains a facade of dark blue bricks as well as glass block windows. The glass blocks were installed to provide insulation and privacy while also allowing illumination. The house was designed with two residential units: Sanders's seven-room apartment on the fourth, fifth, and partial sixth floors, as well as a six-room unit on the second and third floors that was rented to others. The ground story, with a white marble facade and a slightly angled entrance doorway, was used for Sanders's studios. Upon completion, 219 East 49th Street was largely praised for its design.

Davis bought the previous structure in mid-1934 and originally intended to remodel it. Ultimately, the old brownstone was removed and replaced with the current building, which was completed in December 1935. Sanders lived in the house until his death in 1948, and it was sold the year afterward. Since 1980, the house has been owned by Donald Wise. The New York City Landmarks Preservation Commission designated the building as an official landmark in 2008.

== Site ==
The Morris B. Sanders Studio & Apartment is at 219 East 49th Street in the East Midtown and Turtle Bay neighborhoods of Manhattan in New York City. It is along the northern sidewalk of 49th Street between Second Avenue and Third Avenue. The building has a frontage of 19.5 feet (5.9 m) along 49th Street. The land lot has an area of 1,443 square feet (134.1 m^{2}) and a depth of 74 feet (23 m). Nearby buildings and places include Amster Yard immediately adjacent to the north; Turtle Bay Gardens to the east; and Lescaze House to the south.

The site occupied by the Sanders Studio was previously occupied by a two-story (plus basement) house completed in 1869. It was one of numerous masonry houses with brick or brownstone facades to be developed in Turtle Bay starting in the 1860s. These buildings usually occupied land lots that were at most 20 feet (6.1 m) wide and had classically inspired design features such as cornices and porticos. In the early 20th century, some of these houses were renovated with new interiors or exteriors. By then, a large portion of Turtle Bay's population was involved in the arts or architecture, and structures such as the Beaux-Arts Institute of Design and the residential Turtle Bay Gardens and Beaux-Arts Apartments were constructed for this community. William Lescaze's renovation of an existing brownstone on 48th Street, and its subsequent conversion into the Lescaze House, inspired similar renovations to other structures in the neighborhood, including four townhouses on 49th Street in the 1930s and 1940s.

== Architecture ==
219 East 49th Street was designed by Morris B. Sanders and completed in 1935. It was constructed as a new building, rather than a redesign of an existing structure. The building measures five stories high on its south facade, along 49th Street, and six stories high on its north facade, along Amster Yard.

=== Facade ===
219 East 49th Street contains glass block windows that served to provide insulation and privacy while allowing light to pass through. The Macbeth-Evans Glass Company and the Structural Glass Corporation manufactured smaller 5-by-5-inch (130 mm × 130 mm) glass bricks for the first, third, and fifth stories. The Corning Glass Company fabricated 12-by-12-inch (300 mm × 300 mm) glass bricks for the second and fourth stories, which were larger than any other glass bricks manufactured at the time. The differently sized glass blocks were used "to preserve the general scale of decorations" inside.

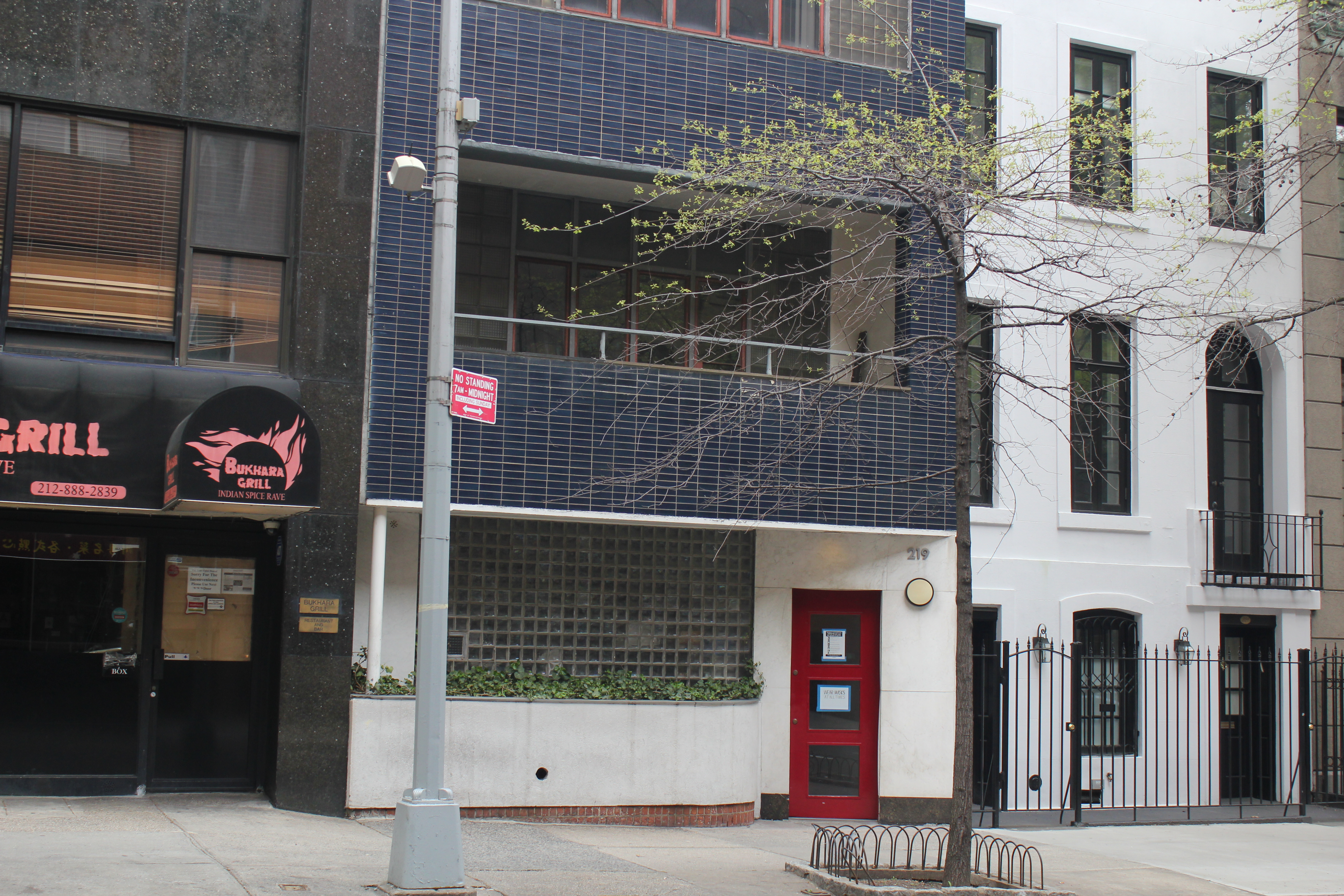
Detail of slanted main entrance

The ground story on 49th Street is framed in white marble and is slightly recessed from the upper stories. On the left side of the ground story is a concrete planter raised a few feet above ground level. Recessed behind the planter is a window of glass blocks shielding Sanders's office inside. The planter curves inward toward a door on the right, which is slightly slanted from the building's lot line. The door consists of three square panes of glass within a red frame; to the right is a circular light and the number "219". The south facade initially contained decorative ivy, which was intended to draw attention from what architectural writer Robert A. M. Stern described as "the seeming contradiction between an almost all glass facade and the seeming lack of windows". (Note: As of 2008, the north facade was the only facade with ivy.)

The second through fifth stories of the south facade are clad with dark blue glazed brick and contain a single rectangular opening on each story. The blue brick served to keep the exterior free of soot; at the time, most similar structures in Manhattan contained white facades, which were susceptible to dirt buildup. The second and fourth stories contain open-air balconies with metal railings, which are set within the blue-brick openings. A wall of large glass blocks, with a doorway on the right side, is set behind the balcony. The recessed balconies also indicated where the living areas of the apartments were. The third and fifth stories have walls of small glass blocks within the blue-brick openings, as well as five casement windows within each glass-block wall. These casement windows were designed with double glazing for insulation and are set in aluminum frames. Above the fifth story, the blue bricks are laid vertically to resemble a cornice.

The west, north, and east facades are clad in red brick. The west and east facades have no windows and abut the neighboring buildings. The north facade has casement windows and glass-block windows, but in a different arrangement for each story. The first story of the north facade is blocked by a parapet of concrete blocks along the border of Amster Yard. The second, third, and fourth stories on the north facade are similar in design, with two casement windows on the left and a larger multi-pane window on the right. The third story retains its original window of small glass blocks on the right, while the second and fourth stories do not; the fourth story also has an iron balcony in front of the windows. The fifth and sixth stories on the north facade are also similar to each other, with small-glass-block walls divided vertically into three sections. The fifth floor has a pair of casement windows in the central panel of the glass-block wall, while the sixth story has two pairs of casement windows within the outer panels.

=== Features ===
As planned, 219 East 49th Street was arranged with a studio apartment on the first floor, as well as two multi-story apartments on the upper stories. Morris B. Sanders and his wife Barbara Castleton Davis were to occupy the studio and the upper triple-story unit. The lower unit, a duplex, to be rented to another family, was designed with six rooms on the second and third rooms. The upper unit, a triplex, was designed as a two-and-a-half-story unit with seven rooms across the fourth, fifth, and partial sixth stories. The sixth floor contained a penthouse for Sanders and Davis's maid.

Each of the two units was served by its own air-conditioning system in the basement, as well as a heat furnace. The basement AC systems were made by Schwerin Air-Conditioning Corporation. Sanders planned the house around the presence of the air-conditioning systems since he anticipated that the windows would never need to be opened. The air-conditioning units took air from both inside and outside, which was then filtered, temperature-adjusted, dehumidified, and circulated through all rooms of both apartments. Sanders also included indirect and direct lighting using a then-new lightbulb design. The living rooms and master bedrooms in both apartments were also equipped with fireplaces and some built-in furniture. The units had open plan rooms as well as floors made of cork and linoleum. The house originally was equipped with metal furniture and recessed cupboards, shelves, and bookcases. Sanders and Davis's unit was characterized as having several storage cupboards.

== History ==
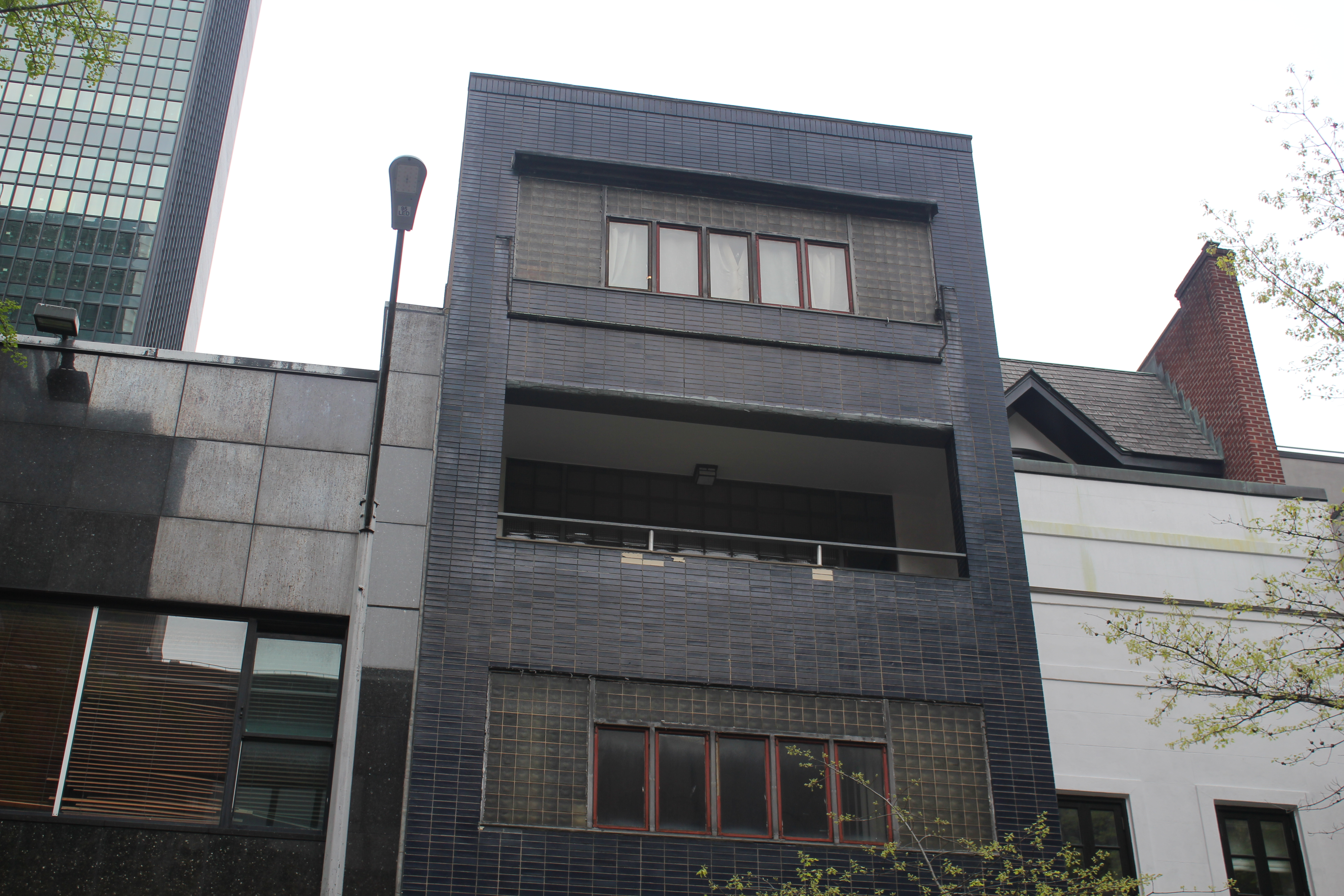
Detail of upper stories

The building's architect and initial tenant, Morris B. Sanders, was born in 1904 in Arkansas. His immediate family ran a plumbing company in Little Rock, and his uncle was prominent Arkansas architect Theodore M. Sanders. Morris Sanders studied at the Phillips Academy and attended college at Yale University before traveling to Paris to study cabinet making. Sanders married window dresser Altina Schinasi in 1928 and became a licensed architect in New York in December 1929. He had divorced Schinasi by 1935 and married Barbara Castleton Davis.

In July 1934, Davis bought a two-story house at 219 East 49th Street for $11,500, giving the seller a purchase money mortgage for $7,000. Davis planned to expand the building by two stories and subdivide the house into two duplex units. Later that year, Sanders prepared plans for a completely new structure with a blue-brick and glass facade. Sanders's plans were officially filed with the New York City Department of Buildings on October 19, 1934, at a projected cost of $20,000. Work began the following March after the previous residence was demolished. The house was finished in December 1935.

The duplex was rented in October 1935 to Armar Archbold and John D. Archbold. The former was described in the New York Herald Tribune as the "director of several air lines", while the latter was a grandson of oil mogul John Dustin Archbold. News media further reported in May 1938 that Armar Archbold had rented the duplex unit. The duplex unit was rented to Fanshawe Lindley in 1943. Around this time, the building also contained the Art Headquarters, which hosted exhibitions such as a display of war posters. Sanders died at his home in September 1948. Architect Morris Lapidus, one of Sanders's neighbors, alleged that Sanders had killed himself, even as news media reported that he had died of a heart attack. Sanders's only obituary was published in the September 3, 1948, issue of Interiors magazine, which characterized 219 East 49th Street as architecturally significant.

After Sanders's death, the triplex unit was rented to Frederick Hurd and Carr F. Pross, who in turn leased the apartment to Maximilian Simon. Another unit was leased to Helen Sprackling that year. The house was sold in August 1949, and owner Anna D. Wiman received a $40,000 mortgage for the building in 1952. Pross apparently also lived in the building until he died in 1954. In 1980, Donald Wise purchased the building. The New York City Landmarks Preservation Commission designated the building as a landmark on November 18, 2008. As of 2021, the building is owned by East 49th Street LLC.

== Critical reception ==
In 1936, the year after the house was completed, Architectural Forum lauded the design as breaking the "stodgy row of brown-faced houses" with its glass-block walls and other materials. The same year, the magazine Modern Mechanix appraised the facade as "impressively beautiful", in large part because of its glass-block walls. 219 East 49th Street was described in the 1939 WPA Guide to New York City as an "interesting building design" with its alternating porches and windows. According to the WPA Guide, the house, along with William Lescaze's and Michael Hare's houses, were distinctive for their colors, materials, and interior design. Several years after Sanders's death, Morris Lapidus recalled that the house had been "a fine modern building, one of the first of its kind", even as he personally found Sanders to be difficult.

After World War II, the Sanders Studio and Apartment was mentioned in numerous guidebooks of New York City architecture. In her 1961 book of modern-architecture walking tours, Ada Louise Huxtable wrote that the house was "a good example of the modern style during its pioneering decades", with its blue brick facade and recessed balconies. (Note: Huxtable characterized the house as "a remodeled brownstone", when it was in fact a new construction.) The 1967 edition of the AIA Guide to New York City described the blue-brick facade and the recessed balconies as being utilitarian, with the duplexes being "clearly expressed on the facade". The 2000 version of the same guidebook focused more on its modernist design. In his 1987 book New York 1930, Robert A. M. Stern lamented that the balconies were "regrettably" oriented toward the street, but described it as one of several residences following the Lescaze House's example.

== See also ==
- List of New York City Designated Landmarks in Manhattan from 14th to 59th Streets
