= Richmond Shreve =

Canadian-American architect (1877–1946)

Richmond Harold Shreve
- Born: June 25, 1877; Cornwallis, Nova Scotia, Canada
- Died: September 11, 1946 (aged 69); Hastings-on-Hudson, New York, U.S.
- Education: Cornell University
- Occupation: Architect
- Practice: Shreve, Lamb and Harmon
- Buildings: Empire State Building

Richmond Harold Shreve (June 25, 1877 – September 11, 1946) was a Canadian-American architect.

== Biography ==
He was born on June 25, 1877, in Cornwallis, Nova Scotia, the son of Richmond Shreve, an Anglican priest, and Mary Catherine Parker Hocken. Shreve attended Cornell University, taught there from 1902 to 1906, and was a member of the Sphinx Head Society.

He was president of the American Institute of Architects from 1941 through 1943.

He died on September 11, 1946, in Hastings-on-Hudson, New York.

== Legacy ==
His company Shreve, Lamb and Harmon led the construction of the Empire State Building as well as several Cornell University buildings. Shreve was also the lead architect for the landmark 1937 Williamsburg Houses housing development in Brooklyn and the Parkchester planned community developed by the Metropolitan Life Insurance Company in the east Bronx in 1941.

He was profiled in the book The 100 Most Notable Cornellians.
