= Lynn Darling =

American author and journalist (born 1952)

- Born: January 9, 1952 (age 74)
- Education: Harvard University (1972)
- Occupations: Author; journalist
- Spouse: Lee Lescaze (1986–1996, his death)

Lynn Darling (born January 9, 1952) is an American journalist and author. She wrote for The Washington Post and became senior editor at Esquire. She is author of the non-fiction books Necessary Sins (2007) and Out of the Woods (2014).

== Early life and education ==
Darling was born January 9, 1952, to Colonel Howard N. Darling and Dorothy Elizabeth Darling (née Budnik). She has two brothers, Howard Christopher Darling and Eric Joseph Darling.

Darling was an army brat and spent her childhood moving every few years between bases in Japan, Hawaii, and Kansas. She graduated from Wilbert Tucker Woodson High School in Fairfax County, Virginia in 1968 before attending Harvard University, where she worked as a reporter for the Harvard Crimson. She graduated in 1972.

== Career ==
After graduating from Harvard University in 1972, Darling joined the staff of the Richmond Mercury, a local newspaper founded by Crimson alumni, including Frank Rich, before being hired by Ben Bradlee of The Washington Post. She worked primarily for the Styles section.

While at The Post, Darling met her future husband, then-married editor Lee Adrien Lescaze. Their subsequent marriage was captured in her 2007 work of non-fiction, Necessary Sins. When Lee Lescaze left the Post, the pair moved to New York City, where Darling became a senior editor at Esquire.

In 2014, she published the non-fiction book Out of the Woods.

== Personal life ==
Darling married American editor and journalist Lee Lescaze on January 18, 1986, in Washington, D.C. The couple have one daughter, Zoe Eliza Lescaze.

Lescaze died on July 26, 1996, from lung cancer.

== Publications ==
- Necessary Sins: A Memoir. The Dial Press. 2007. ISBN 9780385336062.
- Out of the Woods: A Memoir of Wayfinding. Harper. 2014. ISBN 9780061710247.
