= William Lescaze =

Swiss-born American architect (1896–1969)

William Lescaze FAIA
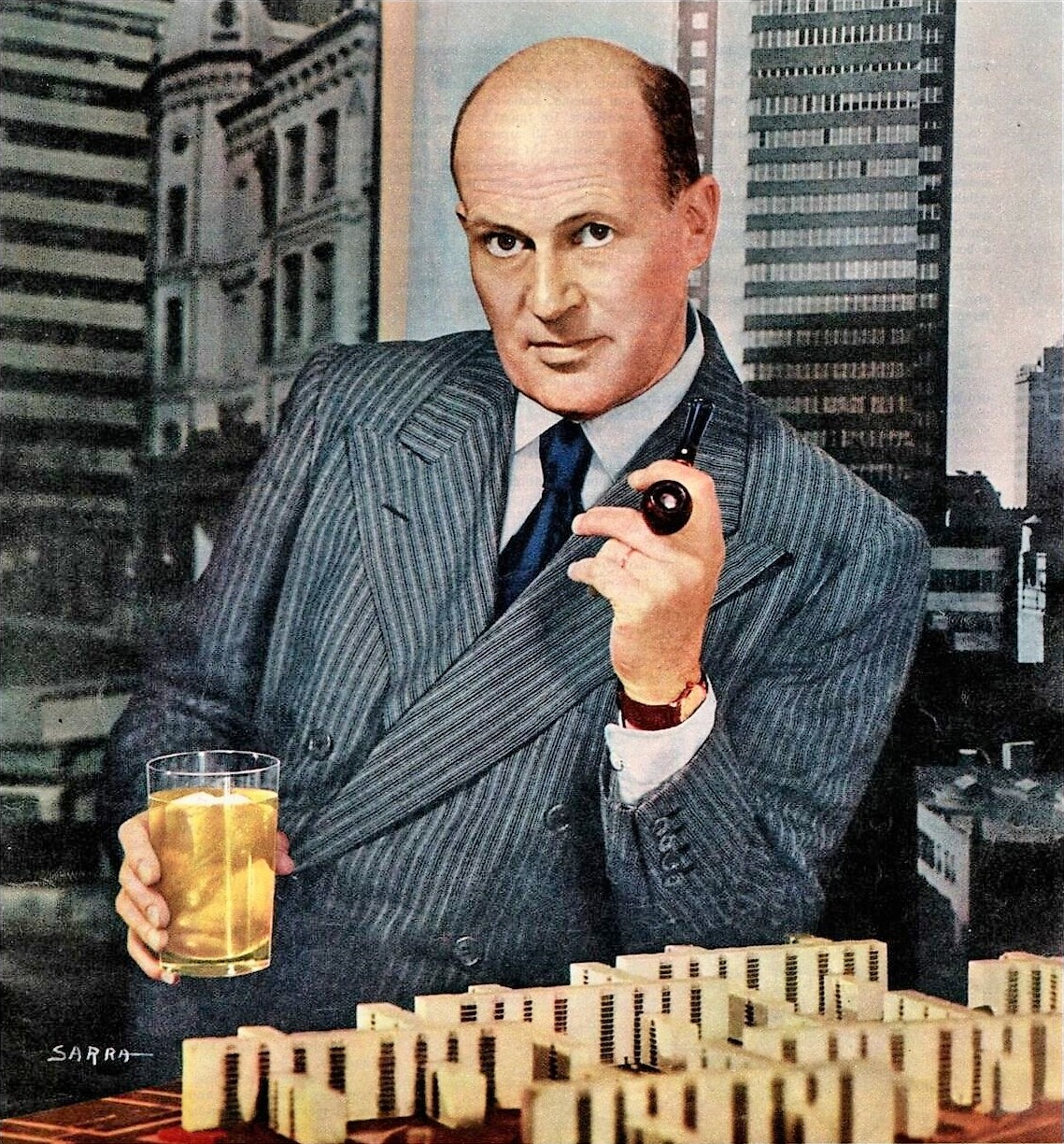
- Lescaze in a 1948 whiskey advertisement
- Born: William Edmond Lescaze; March 27, 1896; Onex, Canton of Geneva, Switzerland
- Died: February 9, 1969 (aged 72); New York City, U.S.
- Education: ETH Zurich; École des Beaux-Arts
- Occupation: Architect
- Spouse: Mary Hughes (m. 1933)
- Children: Lee Lescaze
- Practice: Lescaze & Associates; Howe & Lescaze; Hubbell & Benes
- Buildings: Philadelphia Savings Fund Society (PSFS) Building; Church Center for the United Nations; Raymond C. and Mildred Kramer House; Lescaze House; Williamsburg Houses

William Edmond Lescaze FAIA (March 27, 1896 – February 9, 1969) was a Swiss-born American architect, city planner and industrial designer. He is ranked among the pioneers of modernism in American architecture.

== Early life and education ==
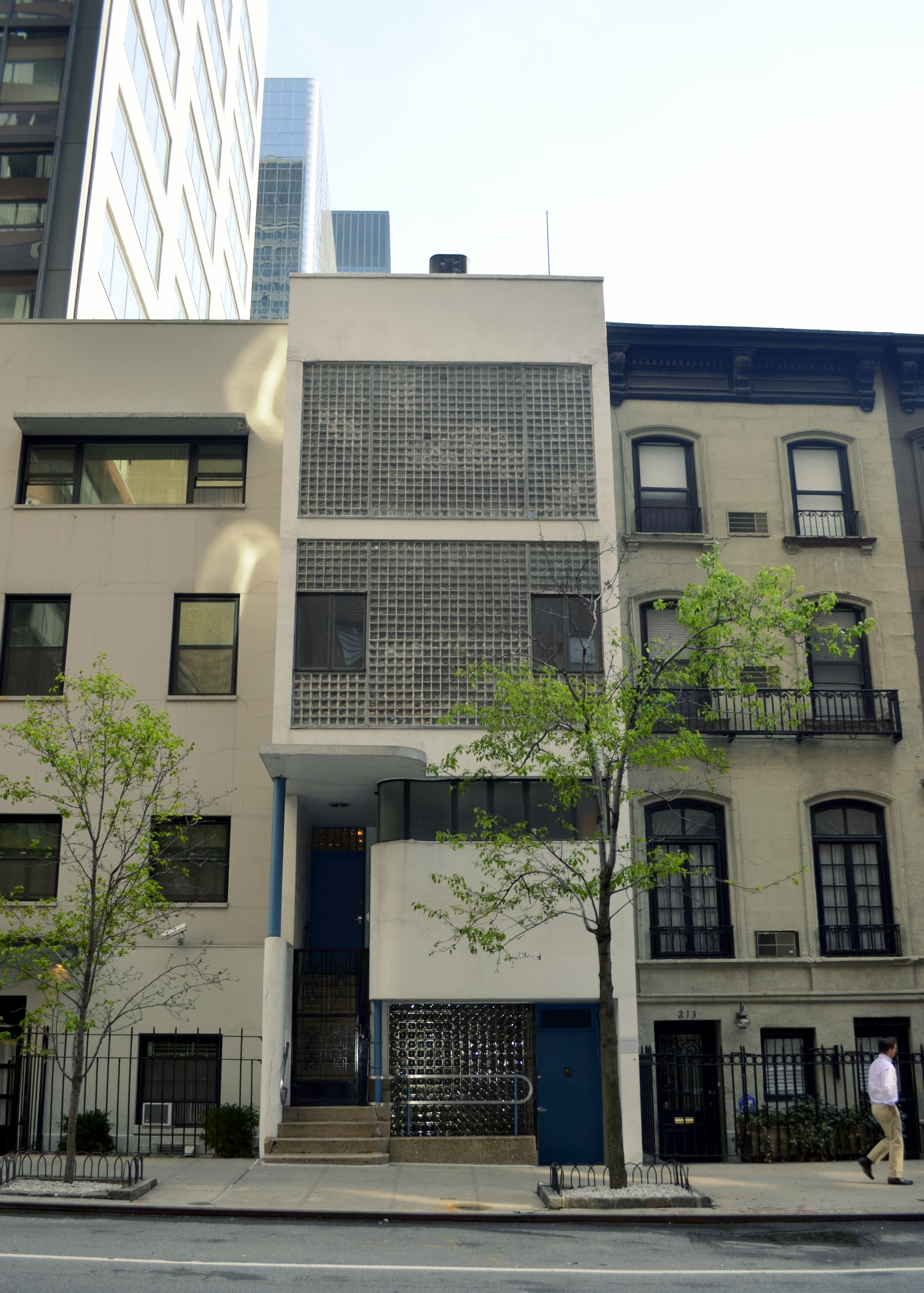
Lescaze House and office at East 48th Street in Manhattan

Lescaze was born in Onex, Switzerland. He studied at the Collège Calvin and at the École des Beaux-Arts, before completing his formal education at the ETH Zurich, where Karl Moser was a teacher, receiving his degree in 1919.

== Career ==
Lescaze contributed to the post-World War I reconstruction effort in Arras, and then immigrated to the United States in 1920. He worked for some time at the architectural firm of Hubbell & Benes in Cleveland, Ohio, and taught French at the local YMCA's night classes.

In 1923, he was offered a modeling job and moved to New York City where he set up his business. His first major work was the design of the Oak Lane Country Day School outside Philadelphia. After a brief time in New York, he returned to Cleveland.

In 1927, he designed the Sutton House Apartments project in New York City. Income from the project allowed him to move back to New York City.

In 1929, Philadelphia architect George Howe invited William Lescaze to form a partnership, Howe & Lescaze. Within just a few weeks after joining forces, the duo began work on a large project for downtown Philadelphia. The resulting structure, completed in 1932, was the Philadelphia Savings Fund Society (PSFS) Building, which is today generally considered the first International Modernist skyscraper, and the first International Style building of wide significance in the United States. It was also the first building with full air conditioning. Lescaze is generally given credit for the design: letters from Howe to Lescaze quote the former insisting to the latter that "the design is definitely yours." The structure replaced the bank's former headquarters in Philadelphia, a classicist structure near Washington Square built in 1897.

In 1930, Howe & Lescaze submitted a design for the new building of the Museum of Modern Art in New York. The wood and metal model was donated to the MOMA in 1994. In 1935, William Lescaze established his own architecture firm, Lescaze & Associates.

His 1937 Alfred Loomis house in Tuxedo Park, NY is regarded as an early experiment in double-skin facade construction. In 1939 he designed a futuristic "House for 2089" that included a helipad on the roof.

Lescaze was also the design lead for the 1937 Williamsburg Houses in Brooklyn, a pioneering 20-building modernist housing project modeled on European examples. He later taught industrial design at the Pratt Institute (1943–1945). Among his built works were the CBS West Coast studios Columbia Square on Sunset Boulevard (1938).

Lescaze also designed the office building at 711 Third Avenue, the city and municipal courts building in the Civic Center in Manhattan, and the High School of Art and Design. From 1949 to 1959, he served at the State Building Code Commission He was a proponent of modern architecture, stating it was the only architecture that could solve the housing problem.

== Personal life ==
He was married to Mary Hughes. His son Lee Adrien Lescaze (1938–1996) was an editor for The Washington Post.

== Death ==
Lescaze died on February 9, 1969, of a heart attack at his home at 211 East 48th Street in Manhattan.

== Major buildings and projects ==
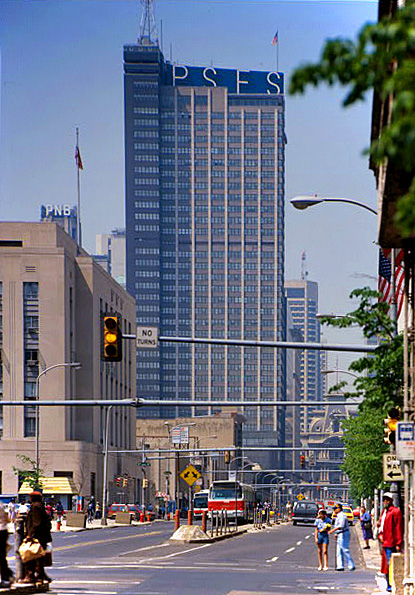
The former Philadelphia Saving Fund Society (PSFS) is now restored and is known as Loew's Philadelphia Hotel.

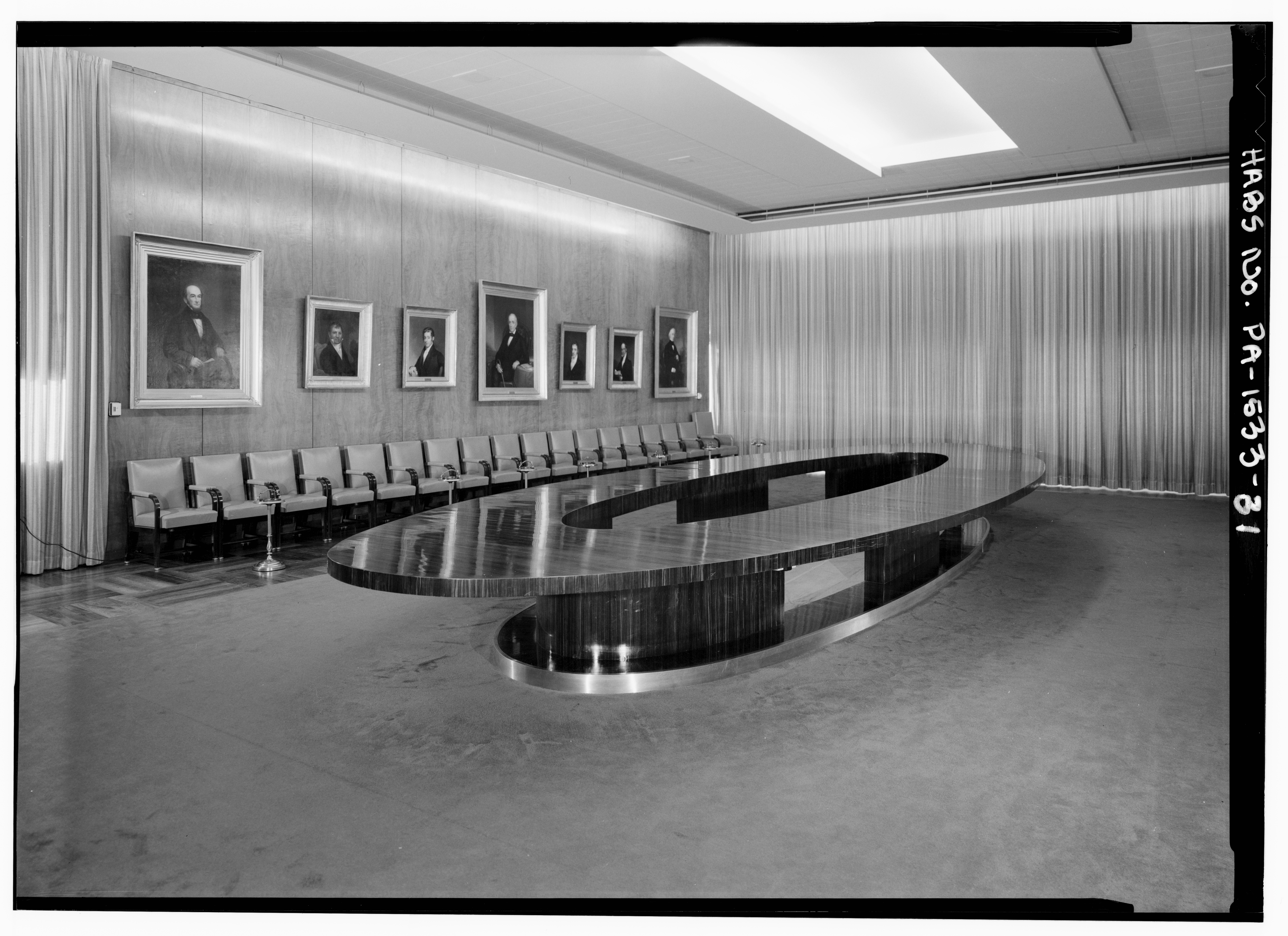
PSFS interior view showing board room conference table

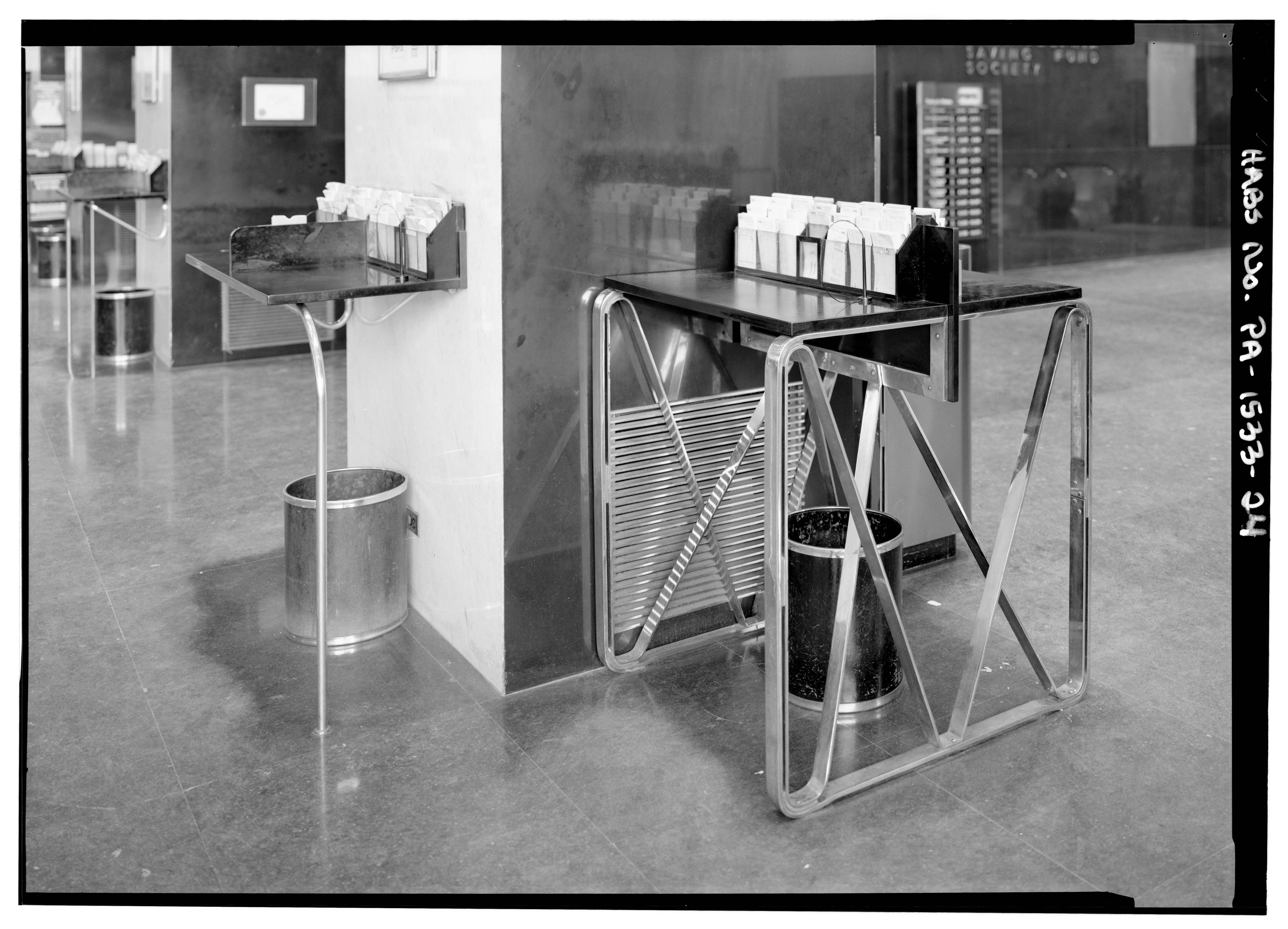
PSFS interior view showing customer writing desks

- 1929: Oak Lane Country Day School, Blue Bell, Pennsylvania
- 1930: Sun Terrace (Field House), New Hartford, Connecticut
- 1932: High Cross House, Dartington Hall, Devon, United Kingdom
- 1932: PSFS Building, (today: Loews Philadelphia Hotel) Philadelphia, Pennsylvania
- 1934: Roy Spreter Studio, Philadelphia, Pennsylvania
- 1934: William Lescaze House and Office, 211 East 48th Street, Manhattan, New York City The house was the first to use glass blocks in New York.
- 1935: Raymond C. and Mildred Kramer House at 32 East 74th Street, Manhattan, New York City
- 1936: Magnolia Lounge, Dallas, Texas
- 1937: Alfred Loomis house, Tuxedo Park, New York
- 1938: CBS Columbia Square Studios, Los Angeles, California
- 1938: Williamsburg Houses, Brooklyn, New York City
- 1941: Norman residence, 70th Street between Park Avenue and Lexington Avenue, Manhattan, New York City
- 1960: Manhattan Civil Court, Civic Center, Manhattan, New York City
- 1961: Manhattanville Houses, New York City
- 1962: Church Center for the United Nations, United Nations Plaza and 44th Street, Manhattan, New York City
- 1963: Brotherhood in Action Building (today: David M. Schwartz Fashion Education Center, Parsons The New School for Design), Manhattan, New York City
- 1971: Metro North Plaza, New York City

== Honors ==
- 1951: Named a Fellow of the American Institute of Architects (AIA)
- In Geneva, a street, the chemin William-Lescaze, was named after him.
