= Lee Lescaze =

American journalist (1938–1996)

Lee Adrien Lescaze (December 8, 1938 – July 26, 1996) was an American journalist from Manhattan. After attending Harvard University, he worked as an editor successively at The Washington Post and The Wall Street Journal. During his Washington D.C., assignment, the FBI rented his Georgetown house as a safe house in the ABSCAM sting operation.

Lee Lescaze was the son of the famous early American modernist architect William Lescaze (1896–1969).

Lescaze had three children from his first marriage: daughters Alexandra and Miranda, and son Adrien, who died in 1989 of injuries sustained in an automobile accident. In 1986, he married American author and journalist Lynn Darling. The couple had one daughter, Zoe Eliza Lescaze.
