= Turtle Bay Gardens Historic District =

Historic district in Manhattan, New York

- U.S. National Register of Historic Places
- U.S. Historic district
- New York State Register of Historic Places
- New York City Landmark
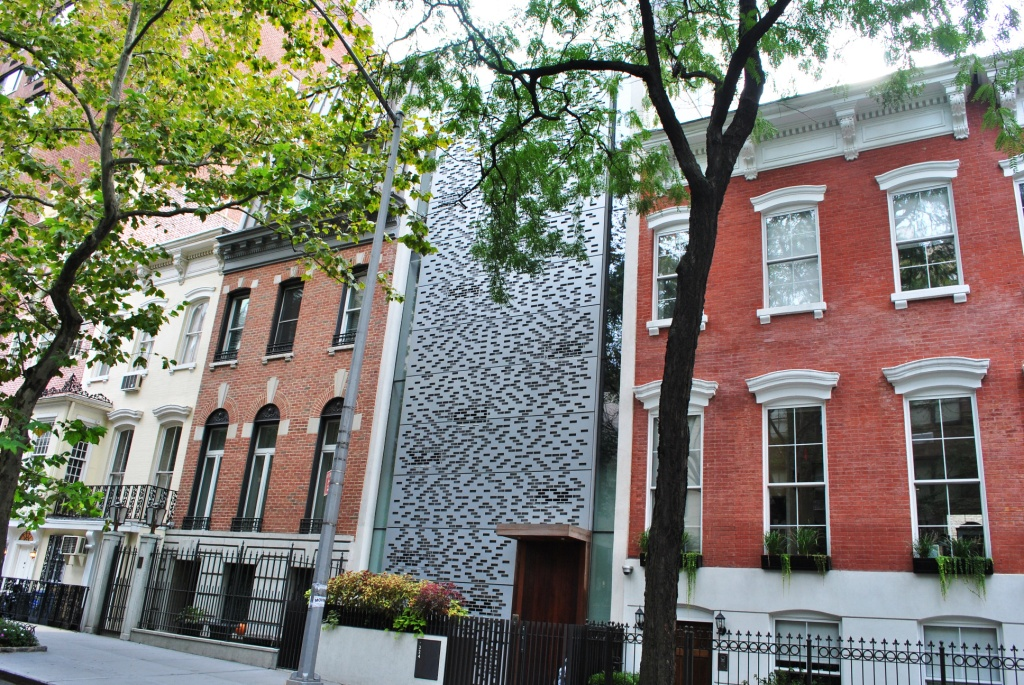

- Location within Manhattan Location within New York City Location within New York
- Location: 226–246 E. 49th St. and 227–245 E. 48th St., New York, New York
- Coordinates: 40°45′15″N 73°58′13″W
- Area: 1.5 acres (0.61 ha)
- Built: 1860
- Architect: Clarence Dean
- Architectural style: Italianate
- NRHP reference No.: 83001750
- NYCL No.: 0279

Significant dates
- Added to NRHP: July 21, 1983
- Designated NYSRHP: May 24, 1980
- Designated NYCL: June 21, 1966

The Turtle Bay Gardens Historic District is a collection of twenty rowhouses in the Turtle Bay neighborhood of Manhattan in New York City. They consist of eleven houses on the south side of 49th Street and nine on the north side of 48th Street, between Second and Third Avenues. The rowhouses, dating from the 1860s, were renovated between 1918 and 1920 by Charlotte Hunnewell Sorchan to plans by Clarence Dean.

The New York City Landmarks Preservation Commission designated the Turtle Bay Gardens Historic District in 1966, and it was listed on the National Register of Historic Places in 1983.

== Design ==
The 20 rowhouses, dating from the 1860s, were purchased in 1918 by Charlotte Hunnewell Sorchan (who remarried in 1921 to Dr. Walton Martin). Her own Hunnewell Mansion was one of the 20 properties. She renovated them between 1918 and 1920 to plans by Clarence Dean. Dean refaced the brownstone street-fronts with pale stucco.

None of the houses are exactly alike, but the street facades are generally four stories high, and some houses have rear attics. The stoops in front of each house were removed; the basements were converted into English basements, slightly below ground level, with rusticated facades. On the street facades, Dean used decorative elements such as balconies made of cast iron, cartouches, parapets, pilasters, quoins, roundels, and stucco detailing. Inside each house, Dean rearranged the interiors so that service room, such as dining rooms faced the noisy street and living areas faced inward.

The rear facades are more plainly decorated, and many of the structures contain roof terraces. The rowhouses' secluded character was emphasized by the presence of tall apartments to the east, along Second Avenue, and office buildings to the west, along Third Avenue. There are loggias on many of the houses' rear facades.

The individual backyards are arranged so that each opens into a common garden of trees and shrubs down the center. Strips of land measuring 6 feet (1.8 m) wide were taken from the rear boundary of each backyard to create the common garden. The shared space is separated from each individual backyard by short walls made of masonry. Running through the center of the garden is a walkway paved in flagstone. There is also a fountain, designed in the style of another at the Villa Medici, which is surrounded by iron benches and shaded by a willow tree.

== Residents and tenants ==
Sorchan sold the houses to friends at cost, with property restrictions that kept the commons secure. Among the first purchasers was Maria Bowen Chapin, founder of the Chapin School. Celebrity residents since have included actors Katharine Hepburn, Ruth Gordon, June Havoc, Ricardo Montalbán, and Tyrone Power; writer-director Garson Kanin; jurist Learned Hand; conductor Leopold Stokowski; editor Maxwell Perkins; publisher Henry Luce; journalist Dorothy Thompson; and writer/journalist E. B. White, who wrote Charlotte's Web when living on 48th Street. Later occupants also included composer Stephen Sondheim and actress Mary-Kate Olsen.

As of 2024, the rowhouse at 240 East 49th Street is the Consulate General of Ukraine in New York. The government of Ukraine had acquired the house from the journalists Gardner Botsford and Janet Malcolm after the dissolution of the Soviet Union.

== See also ==
- List of New York City Designated Landmarks in Manhattan from 14th to 59th Streets
- National Register of Historic Places listings in Manhattan from 14th to 59th Streets
