= PSFS Building =

Skyscraper in Philadelphia, Pennsylvania

Loews Philadelphia Hotel (Former PSFS Building)
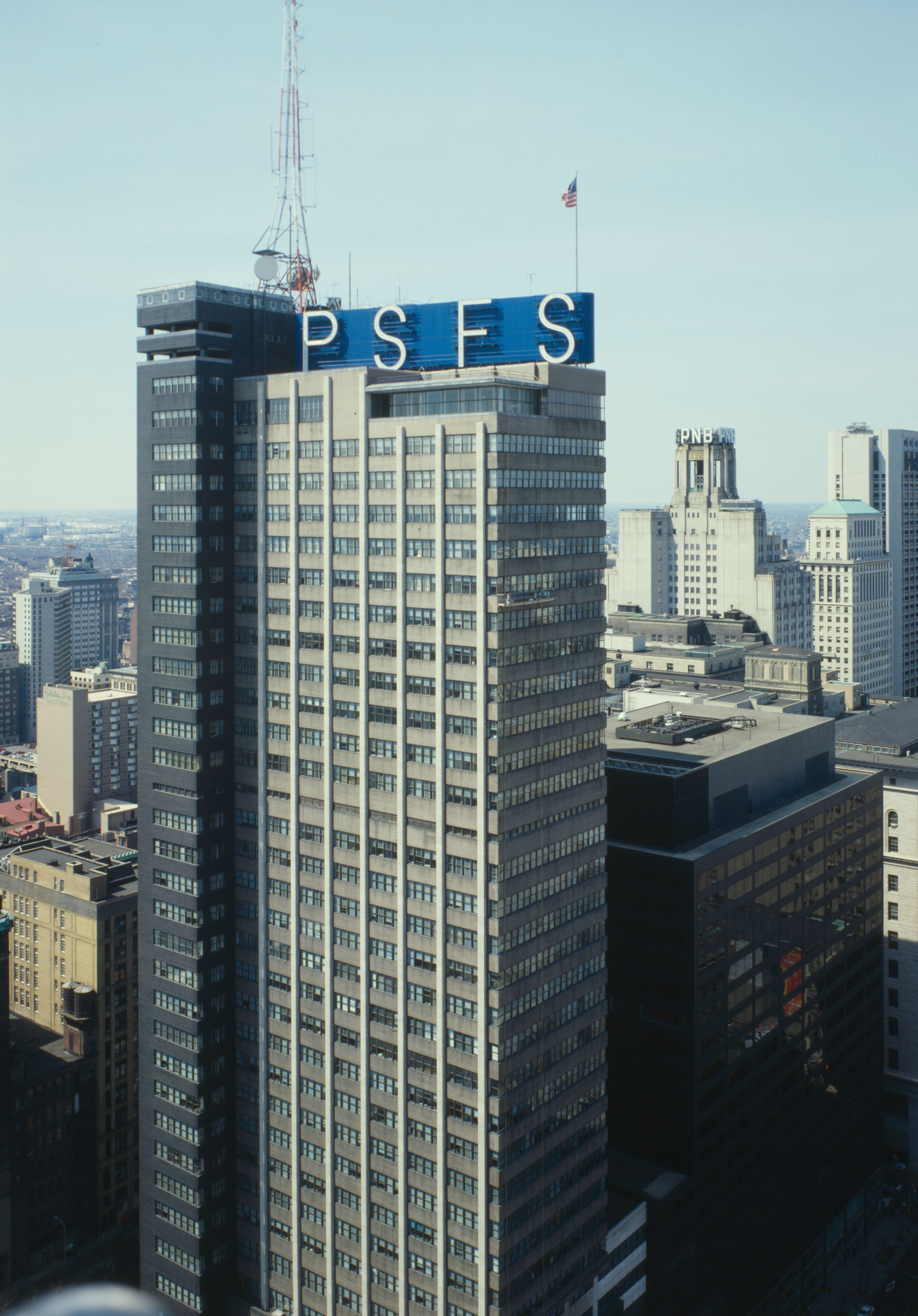
- The PSFS Building in 1985, before its conversion into Loews Philadelphia Hotel

- Location within Philadelphia Location within Pennsylvania Location within the United States

General information
- Status: Completed
- Type: Hotel
- Location: 1200 Market Street, Philadelphia, Pennsylvania, U.S.
- Coordinates: 39°57′5.51″N 75°9′38.21″W
- Opening: 1932; 94 years ago
- Cost: US$8 million (1932)
- Owner: Loews Hotels

Height
- Antenna spire: 794 feet (242 m)
- Roof: 491 feet (150 m)

Technical details
- Floor count: 36

Design and construction
- Architects: William Lescaze; George Howe
- Developer: Philadelphia Saving Fund Society
- Main contractor: George A. Fuller Company
- Philadelphia Savings Fund Society Building
- U.S. National Register of Historic Places
- U.S. National Historic Landmark
- Philadelphia Register of Historic Places
- Pennsylvania state historical marker
- Architectural style: International Style
- NRHP reference No.: 76001667

Significant dates
- Added to NRHP: December 8, 1976
- Designated NHL: December 8, 1976
- Designated PHMC: November 11, 2005

The PSFS Building, also known as the Loews Philadelphia Hotel, is a skyscraper in Center City, Philadelphia, Pennsylvania. The building, the first International Style skyscraper constructed in the United States, was designed by architects William Lescaze and George Howe, was built for the Philadelphia Saving (later Savings) Fund Society. The skyscraper's design was a departure from traditional bank and Philadelphia architecture, lacking features such as domes and ornamentation. Combining Lescaze's experience with European modernism, Howe's Beaux-Arts background and the desire of Society President James M. Wilcox for a forward-thinking, tall building the skyscraper incorporated the main characteristics of International style architecture. The building is listed on the National Register of Historic Places as a National Historic Landmark.

Called the United States' first modern skyscraper, and one of the most important skyscrapers built in the country in the first half of the 20th century, the building featured an innovative and effective design of a T-shaped tower that allowed the maximum amount of natural light and rentable space. The Philadelphia Saving Fund Society's offices and banking hall featured custom-designed furniture, including custom Cartier clocks on every floor. The top of the skyscraper featured the bank's boardroom. The building was the second high-rise in the U.S. to be equipped with air conditioning. The skyscraper is topped by a red neon sign with the PSFS initials. Visible for 20 miles (32 km), the sign has become a Philadelphia icon.

In the 1980s, the Philadelphia Savings Fund Society lost millions of dollars. In 1992, the bank and its building were seized by the Federal Deposit Insurance Corporation (FDIC); by then, the skyscraper was 85 percent vacant. The FDIC auctioned the building off, and it was bought by developers to turn into a Loews Hotel. The Pennsylvania Convention Center opened in 1993 a block away. Conversion into a hotel began in 1998, and the Loews Philadelphia Hotel opened in time for the 2000 Republican National Convention.

== History ==
=== Construction ===
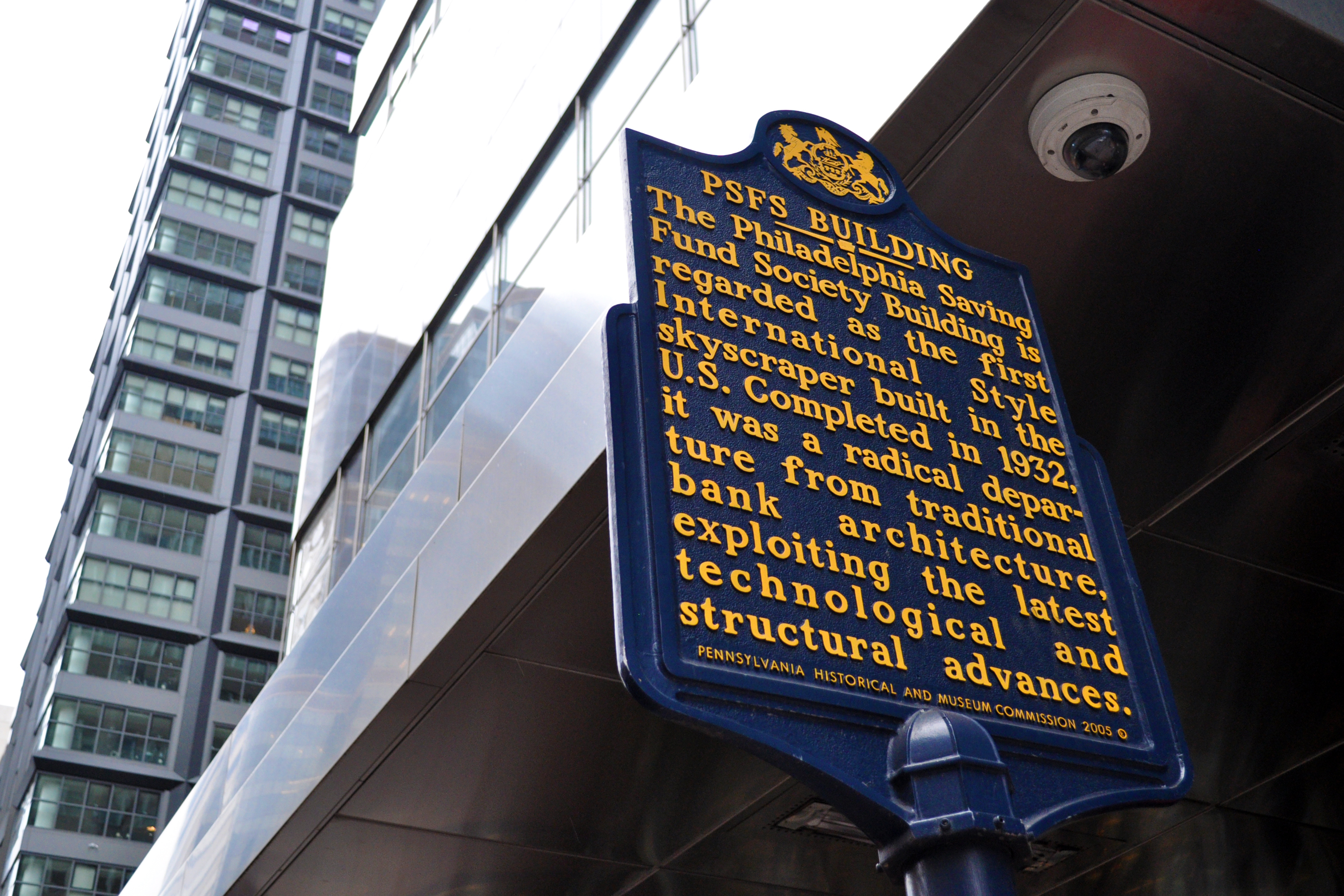
Historical marker for the building at 1200 Market Street

In the 1920s, banks such as Girard Trust Company and other businesses such as Wanamaker's and Sun Oil Company were expanding by building skyscrapers in Center City Philadelphia. To replace their Walnut Street headquarters, the Philadelphia Saving Fund Society (PSFS) began planning a new building on Market Street at the former location of the William Penn Charter School. Under direction of bank President James M. Wilcox, they began seeking designs for a new building. The proposal submitted by architects William Lescaze and George Howe was accepted by the board of directors in November 1930. During the 1920s, Howe worked for the firm Mellor, Meigs and Howe where he designed two Beaux-Arts styled bank branches for PSFS.

In 1929, Howe left the firm and partnered with Lescaze. Together, with influence from Wilcox, they designed the new PSFS Building.

Construction was contracted to the George A. Fuller Company. Completed in 1932 at a cost of $8 million, the PSFS Building was a modern departure from traditional bank architecture and other Philadelphia skyscrapers. Designed in the International style, the building was among the first skyscrapers of its type built in the United States.

Part of the modern amenities installed to attract tenants included radio reception devices installed in each of the building's offices by the RCA Victor Company. The Carrier Engineering Corporation was contracted to install air conditioning inside the building, making it only the second air-conditioned high-rise in the United States.

=== PSFS use ===
The skyscraper was completed during the Great Depression, and the neon initials of the Philadelphia Saving Fund Society were kept lit throughout the economic troubles to create a symbol of hope and consistency for the city. In the early part of the Depression the initials were jokingly said to mean "Philadelphia Slowly Faces Starvation." The Philadelphia Saving Fund Society occupied 112,723 square feet (10,000 m^{2}) of the 374,628 square feet (35,000 m^{2}) of office space in the building. The remaining office space was available for rent by other tenants. One notable tenant was Towers Perrin, which established itself in the PSFS Building in 1934.

Over the years, the building with its sign became a Philadelphia landmark. The PSFS Building was listed as a National Historic Landmark in 1976 because of its architectural significance.

In 1982, PSFS merged with the Western Savings Fund Society and expanded into other financial services. In September 1985, the bank began doing business as Meritor Financial Group, of which PSFS became a subsidiary. Meritor's aggressive expansion in the 1980s led to the company losing millions of dollars in new business ventures. In 1989 Meritor sold 54 of its PSFS branches and the PSFS name to Mellon Bank. The deal went into effect in 1990 and, on May 21 of that year, the building's neon sign was turned off. Meritor said that having sold the name it was inappropriate to light the sign. Turning off the sign provoked outrage and protest from the public, historians, and architecture buffs. As a result, Meritor and Mellon Bank agreed to relight the sign and keep it lit. Meritor said, "We agreed that it was in the best interest of the city to relight it."

In the late 1980s, an office building boom in the Market Street West neighborhood of Center City was attracting tenants looking for larger office space away from the older PSFS Building. By 1992, the building was 85 percent vacant and in December of that year the Federal Deposit Insurance Corporation (FDIC) seized Meritor Financial Group and sold off the rest of its bank branches to Mellon Bank. The FDIC took control of Meritor's remaining assets including the PSFS Building. The FDIC was not the sole owner of the building since Meritor had, by the 1990s, sold off interest in the building to several partners.

=== Hotel conversion ===
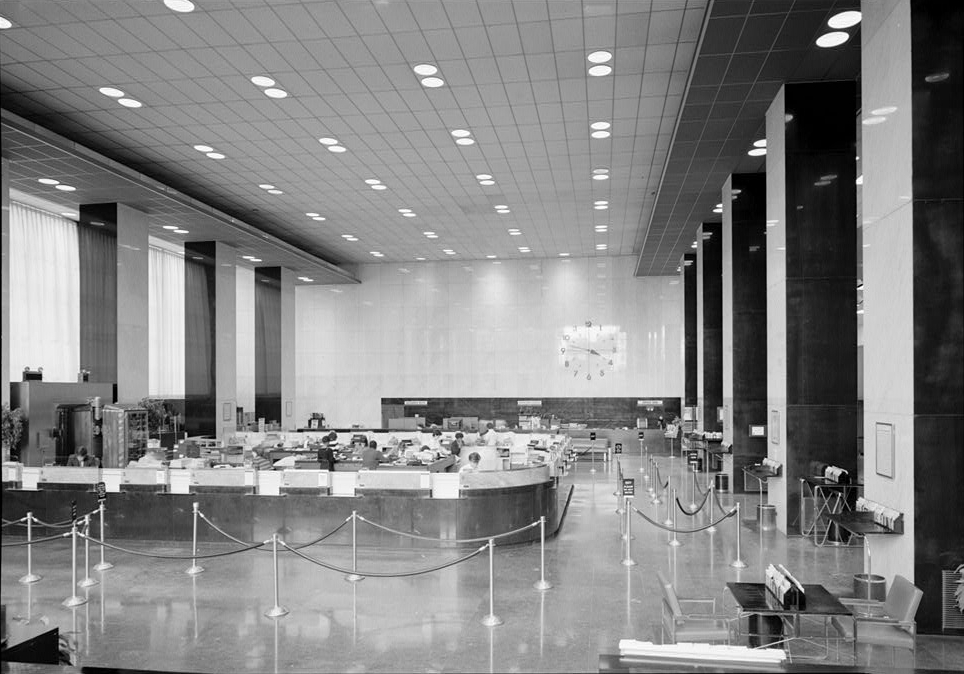
The banking hall in 1985

By 1994, the PSFS Building was looking frayed and much of Meritor's furniture and equipment was sold off at auction by the FDIC in 1993. That same year, the Pennsylvania Convention Center opened one block away from the PSFS Building and numerous new hotels were appearing around the city. Originally thinking of turning the PSFS Building into apartments, developer Carl Dranoff decided a hotel would be best after noticing a Marriott being built across the street. Dranoff hired Bower Lewis Thrower Architects who created a plan, which he took to commercial developer Ronald Rubin of the Rubin Organization. Rubin took over the project and hired Dranoff to oversee it. Rubin first approached Hyatt and after negotiations that lasted a year Hyatt decided to build an entirely new property at Penn's Landing instead. Rubin then approached the Loews Hotels chain.

On April 11, 1997, developer Rubin, hotelier Jonathan Tisch, and Philadelphia mayor Ed Rendell announced in the PSFS boardroom that the PSFS Building would be converted into a Loews Hotel. Over the next year, the conversion of the building into a hotel was delayed while Loews negotiated with the Rubin Organization to buy out its interest in the building. An agreement was formally reached in June 1998, and work began on the building shortly thereafter. After a year-long delay on starting the renovations, there were concerns more delays would occur if the building's conversion turned out to be more difficult than first thought. The concern stemmed from the city's attempt to attract a political convention to the city in 2000. A key part of attracting a political convention was the number of available hotel rooms in the host city, and completion of the PSFS Building on time was an important factor.

To be an effective convention hotel, the building required an extra 40,000 square feet (3,700 m^{2}) for a ballroom and meeting spaces, without which the hotel conversion would not have taken place. Land was acquired along 12th Street and an addition was built. The decision to use the banking hall for functions instead of serving as the hotel's lobby was financially driven by allowing the hotel to rent out the large hall for events. In the banking hall, the teller counter was removed despite being a "character defining" feature. The metal and glass wall that separates the mezzanines and the hall was required by safety code. The staircase that connects the mezzanine floors had been enclosed by a modern wall, but the wall was removed in the restoration. The 33rd-floor rooms, including the boardroom, were restored, and much of the original furniture was acquired by Loews. There were few distinct features of the building on the first floor so the developers used the area for the hotel lobby. Among other changes to the first floor was creating access to the lobby from the Market Street entrance.

The Loews Philadelphia Hotel opened in April 2000 with renovation costs totaling US$115 million. The year before completion, the Republican Party had decided to hold their 2000 National Convention in Philadelphia despite the earlier concerns of hotel space. The Florida delegation would stay at the Loews Philadelphia during the event.

== Architecture ==
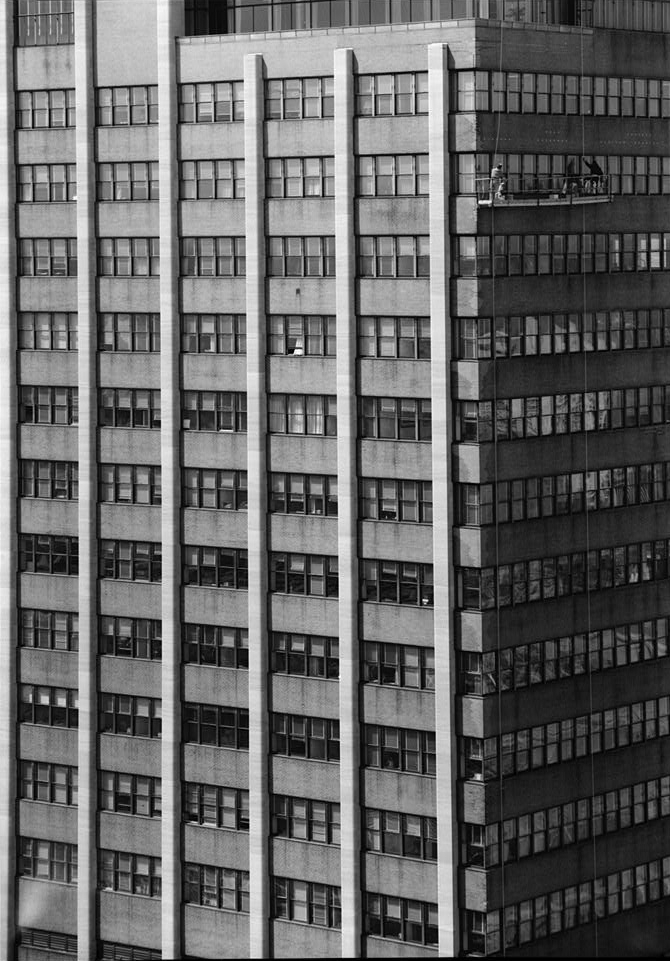
The skyscraper's façade

The PSFS Building was built for the Philadelphia Saving Fund Society under direction of bank President James M. Wilcox. Wilcox's goal for the building was "ultra modern only in the sense that it is ultra-practical." The building's design went through several revisions with Wilcox working closely with architects William Lescaze and George Howe. The building was a radical departure from the traditional Greek and Italian inspired bank architecture. Beaux-arts trained George Howe combined his experience with William Lescaze familiarity of modern European design. The building designed was in the International style, a term that would be coined two years after the building was designed. The main characteristics of the style, focus on volume over mass, balance rather than preconceived symmetry, and the lack or ornamentation are all in the design of the skyscraper. Analysis of the proposed design of the building by the Philadelphia Saving Fund Society stated that the belief that traditional banking architecture would soon become obsolete and that economic realities would lead to similarly designed buildings in the near future. The analysis said "Marble halls and fantastic domes have been overdone and no longer excite the public's interest. They have had their day. An era of sound and handsome but 100% practical buildings is at hand."

Wilcox was the one who encouraged emphasizing the buildings height with vertical piers. Howe argued against the vertical lines wanting to emphasize the office space inside the tower. Wilcox was adamant about showing off the building's height and in the end vertical piers were added, along with emphasizing the horizontal space inside using the spandrels. The piers protrude from the facade to not interfere with wall space and allow the maximum amount of floor space and flexible office arrangement. The t-shaped tower was designed in a way to allow in the maximum amount of light on the office floors and to emphasize the banking portion in the base. The building's spine containing elevators and utilities was made visible on the outside for the first time in a skyscraper instead of hidden inside in the center of the building.

Putting the banking hall on the second floor allowed for retail space on the street level, giving the building's owners extra revenue and attracting middle-class depositors to the bank. To support the tower above, structural columns extend from a 16.5 feet (5.0 m) deep truss in the banking hall floor. Lescaze designed the curved base, giving it marble to give the building a sense of luxury from the street level.

=== Exterior ===
The PSFS Building is a 36-story, 491-foot (150 m) skyscraper in the Market East neighborhood in Center City, Philadelphia, Pennsylvania. Located at the corner of 12th and Market Streets, the skyscraper contains 557,000 square feet (52,000 m^{2}) in the original building, with more space provided by a modern addition. The main building consists of a T-shaped tower and its base. The tower is split between the building's cross-bar that serves as the skyscraper's spine, and the rest of the tower which projects from the spine asymmetrically. The office floors are set back from 12th Street about 20 feet (6 m) and is set back on its western side about 40 feet (12 m).

The tower's facade is made up of vertical piers of limestone and horizontal spandrels of matte buff brick. The piers protrude 15 inches (38 cm) outward from the rest of the facade. The facade of the core of the tower, which contains the elevators, stairwells, and utilities, is made of glazed black brick. The tower's windows are grouped in sets of four on the east and west sides of the tower. The north-side windows stretch across its entire length except for at the fourth and fifth floors where the windows are two sets of four flanking a set of six. The 21st floor, a mechanical floor that houses the air conditioning equipment, has narrower windows than on the rest of the building.

The building's base is differentiated from the rest of the tower by a facade of polished granite and large windows. The base is wider than most of the tower above and is curved at the corner facing the Market Street and 12th Street intersection. The base housed the original banking hall and former retail space. Two-story-tall windows set in flat aluminum frames open into the banking hall area, curving with the rest of the base. Stainless steel rods make up the window mullions.

==== Sign and tower ====
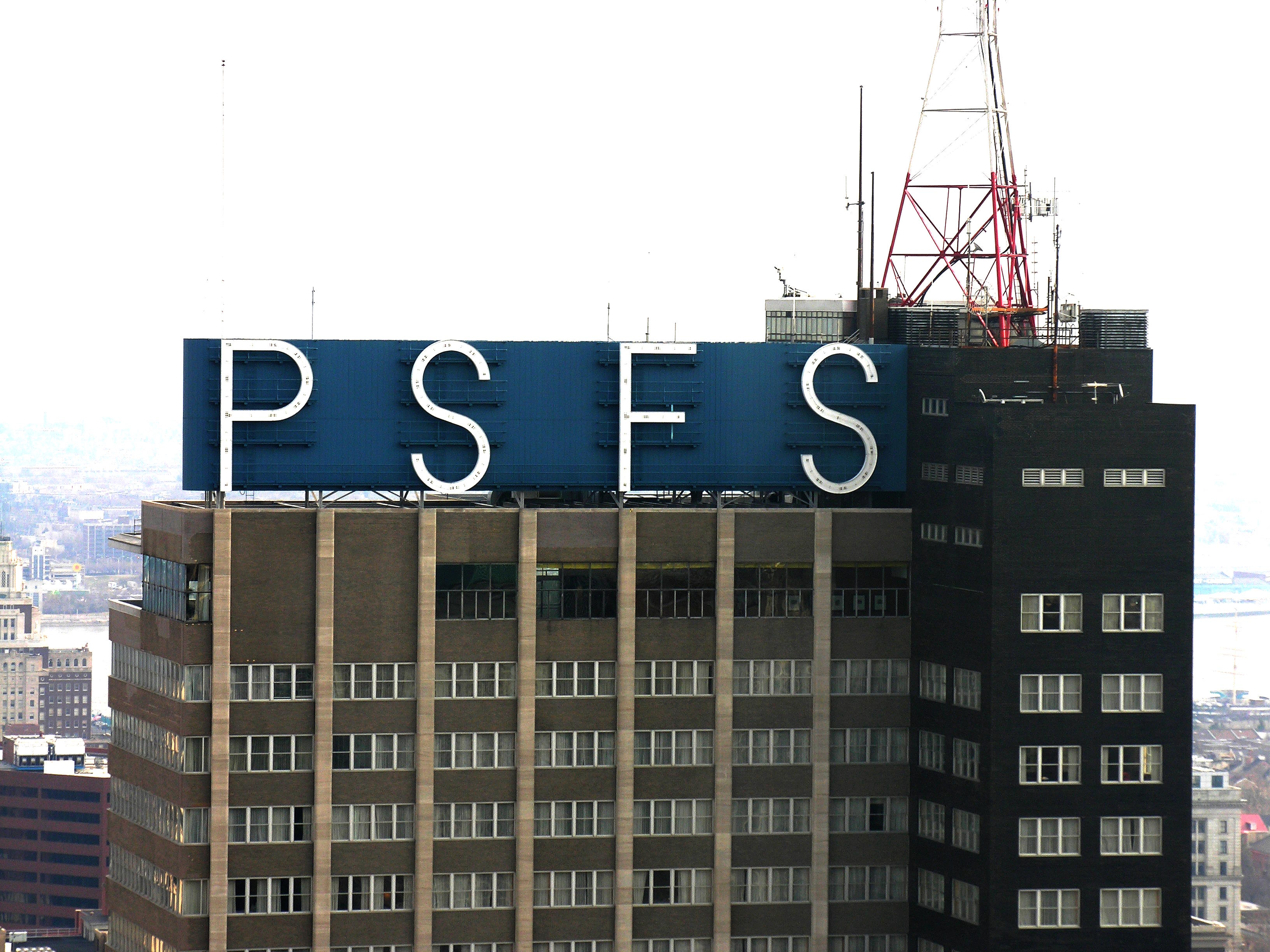
The hotel's roof

The skyscraper is topped by a distinctive sign with the Philadelphia Saving Fund Society's initials. The 27-foot-high (8.2 m) letters are white by day and illuminated with red neon lights by night. The sign hides mechanical equipment and can be seen for 20 miles (32 km). The PSFS sign has become an icon for Philadelphia. At the time of construction, abbreviations were rarely used but architects Howe and Lescaze pushed for their use as the full name would have been illegible from the ground. When Loews announced it was going to be converted into a hotel, the first question asked by reporters was what was happening to the sign. Loews briefly considered altering the sign by projecting the Loews name on it, but the idea was soon scrapped. South of the sign is a 258-foot (79 m) television tower. The tower was added in 1948 and was originally used for WCAU-TV and WCAU-FM but is now used as a transmission site for KIH28 NOAA Weather Radio and an auxiliary site for WMMR.

When the Loews Hotel acquired the building, they acknowledged the regional significance of the sign, and agreed to keep the letters in place and illuminated. Philadelphia Sign Company was tasked with the job of servicing the massive letters by the new owner. The company was subsequently hired to create a LED fixture when the neon letters were found to be unrepairable. Originally, the Philadelphia Historical Commission would not approve the LED sign because of how it illuminated the carved letters, but a modified LED sign was approved in July 2015. The custom LED retrofit was complete in early 2016.

=== Interior ===
The building features two street entrances and one subway entrance. The 52-foot-tall (16 m) Market Street entrance lobby features stairs and escalators leading up to the former banking hall. The black, gray, and white marble lobby features a three-story window with stainless steel mullions set in a flat aluminum frame similar to the windows in the banking hall. The other entrance is on 12th Street. Originally designed for the office workers in the towers, the entrance now leads to the hotel's lobby. Custom Cartier clocks decorate both entrance lobbies and every elevator lobby.

The large banking hall features stainless-steel columns supporting the tower above and two mezzanine levels, now separated from the hall by a metal and glass wall. The mezzanine levels are connected by a black and white staircase.

The 33rd floor contains the boardroom, a dining room, a solarium and other spaces intended for PSFS's board of directors. Wooden paneling is featured throughout the 33rd floor. Hudoke wood veneer decorates the walls of the Committee Room, Macassar ebony walls and original wooden Venetian blinds decorate the hallway, and Macassar ebony and rosewood paneling makes up the Boardroom and Main Dining Room.

==== Office building ====
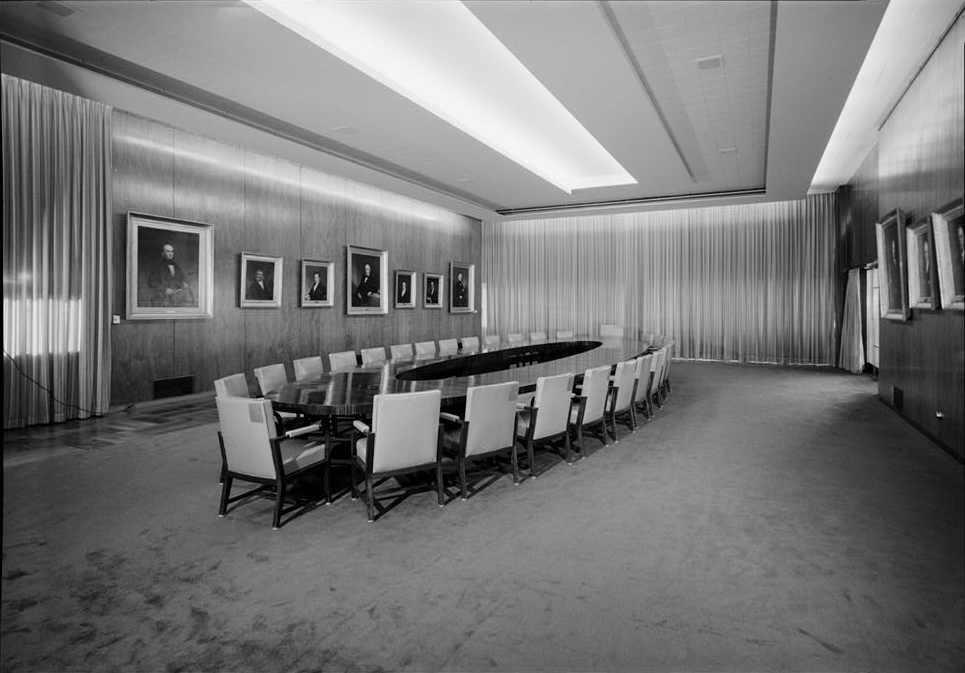
The PSFS boardroom in 1985

The skyscraper was originally designed for banking and offices. The base of the tower contained retail and office space along with a large banking hall and its associated facilities. The main floor of the banking hall housed the Philadelphia Saving Fund Society's teller counters and tubular steel furniture custom designed for the banking floor. On the mezzanine levels were the bank's offices, a vault and safe deposit boxes. Below the banking hall, on the ground and basement floors, was 28,755 square feet (2,700 m^{2}) of retail space designed to be able to be altered as needed. Last rented by Lerner's dress shop, the retail space originally featured display windows and store access in the subway station below.

The office tower contained 374,628 square feet (35,000 m^{2}) of office and banking space. 228,867 square feet (21,000 m^{2}) of that space was available to rent. The rental space spanned over 30 floors and attracted potential tenants by featuring radio outlets in every office, air conditioning and garage facilities. The rental floors were meant to be adjusted for the tenants' needs, and the floor configurations have been repeatedly changed over the years. In the 1970s more than 2,000 people worked in the building.

The 33rd-floor boardroom contained a massive oval table with a Macassar ebony veneer. The hallway leading to the boardroom and solarium contained coat hooks for each of the board members and senior officers. The foyer had a chart listing the presidents and board members of the Philadelphia Saving Fund Society through the years and where they sat at the boardroom table. The foyer also featured a sketch of the old Walnut Street Headquarters and a list of bank offices and the dates they opened. The board room was decorated with portraits of the bank's founders and its presidents. The chairs around the board table each have a plaque on the back that showed the number of the chair and the names of the current and previous board members who sat there.

==== Loews Hotel ====
While the T-shaped space in the tower was not useful as modern offices, it has an ideal shape for hotel rooms. The conversion of the tower to a hotel was led by project principal Arthur Jones of Bower Lewis Thrower Architects and preservation consultant Robert Powers of Powers and Associates. Since the building is a National Historic Landmark and is listed on the Philadelphia Register of Historic Places, all changes to the building were monitored by the National Park Service, the State Historic Preservation Office, and the Philadelphia Historical Commission. The Loews Philadelphia Hotel contains 581 guestrooms including 37 suites in a total building area of 631,006 sq.ft. The hotel features 40,000 square feet (3,700 m^{2}) square feet of function space in three ballrooms and fourteen conference rooms. The hotel also offers a 31st-floor Concierge Library and fifth-floor spa, pool, and fitness center.

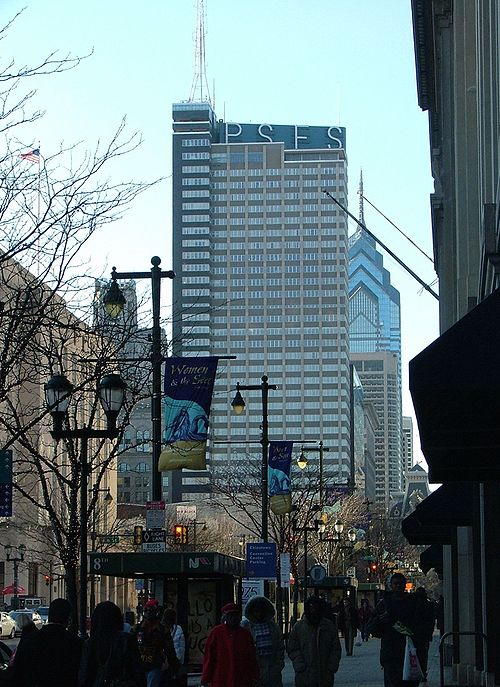
The PSFS building in 2006

The annex on 12th Street was required to be differentiated from the rest of the structure, but be built of comparable materials, structure and size. The developers also had to ensure the addition would not damage the original building in case it was demolished. The addition also reduced changes to the rest the original building that would have been needed to make room for certain amenities. The four-story, concrete-framed, glass and aluminum addition houses a parking garage's entrance and exit, meeting spaces, hotel service facilities, a kitchen, and a room for mechanical equipment. On the north side of the building a canopy with Loews signage on it was added to the Market Street entrance. The loading areas and motor lobby are located off of 12th Street and often become heavily congested.

Daroff Design, Inc. was in charge of decorating the interiors. Daroff Design and Loews decided International style would not provide the atmosphere hotel guests sought and predominantly used the Art Deco style instead. Critics criticized the use of Art Deco, saying Daroff Design did not understand the International style and cheapened the original building. However, one architecture critic said "Daroff's flamboyant approach allows Howe and Lescaze's contribution to have its own identity, and Daroff to have hers." Karen Daroff said, "Our first instinct was to stay with the minimal design of the International style but we did need to soften it. We took almost a cinematic approach, using Hollywood's view of the '20s and '30s, juxtaposed with the abstract geometry."

The banking hall was converted to the Millennium Hall Ballroom. Separated by a metal and glass screen, the mezzanine levels are used as pre-function space and dining areas. Located by the 12th Street entrance on the ground floor, the lobby is decorated by the original vault door from the third-floor mezzanine, the bronze ceiling from the safe deposit box area, and the tellers' counters from the banking hall. Designed to mimic the building's original style, the lobby contains stainless-steel columns that replicate the ones found on the mezzanine, and the walls are of wood and marble. The ground floor also contains the Bank & Bourbon (formerly Solefood) Restaurant, Bar, and Lounge and a street-level, glass-walled news studio for the NBC affiliate WCAU.

== Reception ==
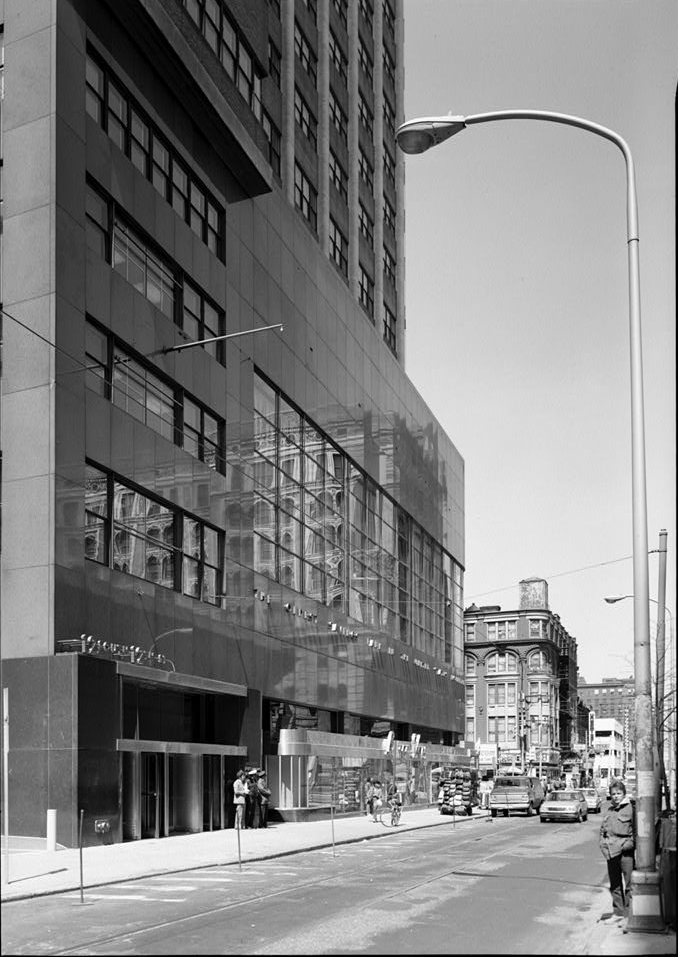
The 12th Street façade in 1985

The design of the PSFS Building elicited both early criticism and praise. In the March 1931 issue of T-Square Club Journal Elbert Conover said, "The day will come when even in America, we will become skillful enough to meet economic pressure without forcing upon the community such ugliness and illogical designing." Robert A. M. Stern called the building "rarest of phenomena of our time, a working monument", praising the refined details and saying the building's form and function had been skillfully united. William Jordy said the building's uniqueness "appears in its extraordinary ambiguity, as reconciliation, synthesis, and prophecy." Jordy also wrote that the building, while signaling a late arrival of the 1920s "European functionalist style", also shunned many Beaux-Arts principles, being "not even quite the unadulterated exemplar of the International style that it seems to be".

The PSFS Building was one of two U.S. skyscrapers included in the 1932 International style exhibition at the Museum of Modern Art (MoMA), along with New York City's McGraw-Hill Building. Run by Henry-Russell Hitchcock and Philip Johnson, the exhibition originated the term "International style". The PSFS Building was praised for its cantilevering facade and the building's organization of shops on the first floor, the banking hall on the second floor, offices above and the service tower in the back. Hitchcock and Johnson were critical of both buildings' use of ornamental signage at the top. However, the PSFS design was not featured at the 1932 Architectural League of New York Annual Exhibition, as its design was deemed ugly and illogical. Howe responded by saying "Like all institutions which have become traditional, it tends to resent change."

In 1939 the building was awarded the gold medal by the Philadelphia chapter of the American Institute of Architects. While the PSFS Building would later influence other buildings, the skyscraper did not start a trend in banking architecture. Spiro Kostof attributed this to the building's "too coolly self-possessed, too intellectual" design. After the International style became popular in the 1950s, the PSFS Building was called one of the most important skyscrapers built in the United States in the first half of the 20th century. Called the United States' first truly modern skyscraper by Architectural Review in 1957, the PSFS Building was awarded Building of the Century by the Philadelphia chapter of the American Institute of Architects in 1969.

== See also ==
- List of tallest buildings in Philadelphia
- List of tallest buildings in Pennsylvania
- List of National Historic Landmarks in Philadelphia
- National Register of Historic Places listings in Center City, Philadelphia
