= Beekman =

Beekman is a Dutch toponymic surname, literally translating as "creek man". Variant forms are Beeckman and Beekmans. The Estonian poet Vladimir Beekman's family originally carried the name Peekmann. People with the surname include:

== People ==
=== Beekman family of New York ===
For prominent members of the Beekman family of New York state, originally of Overijssel, Netherlands, see: Beekman family

=== Other people with the surname ===
- Aimée Beekman (born 1933), Estonian writer, wife of Vladimir
- Allan Beekman (1913–2001), American reporter and author
- Anton Albert Beekman (1854–1947), Dutch geographer
- Augustus A. Beekman (1923–2008), New York City fire commissioner
- Cornelius C. Beekman (1828–1915), American banker in Jacksonville, Oregon
- Jaap Beekman (1919–2010), Dutch World War II resistance fighter, husband of Yolande
- Josh Beekman (born 1983), American football player and coach
- Marcel Beekman (born 1969), Dutch tenor
- Vladimir Beekman (1929–2009), Estonian writer, poet and translator, husband of Aimée
- Yolande Beekman (1911–1944), World War II heroine, wife of Jaap

Beekmans

- Gerard Beekmans (born 1979), Dutch programmer
- Paul Beekmans (born 1982), Dutch footballer

=== Given name ===
- Beekman Du Barry (1828–1901), United States Army Brigadier General
- Beekman V. Hoffman (1789–1834), United States Navy officer
- Beekman Winthrop (1874–1940), American Governor of Puerto Rico 1909–13
- Garry Beekman Trudeau (born 1948), American cartoonist
- Henry Beekman Livingston (1748–1828), American poet

== Places and buildings ==
- Beekman, New York, a town in Dutchess County
- Beekman, Manhattan, a residential neighborhood
- For places and buildings named after members of the Beekman family of New York state, see: Beekman family

== See also ==
- Beeckman, variant spelling of the same name
- Chris Klein-Beekman (1971–2003), Canadian aid worker
- Beakman's World, a children's educational TV series
