= Beekman, Manhattan =

Exclusive residential neighborhood, East Side

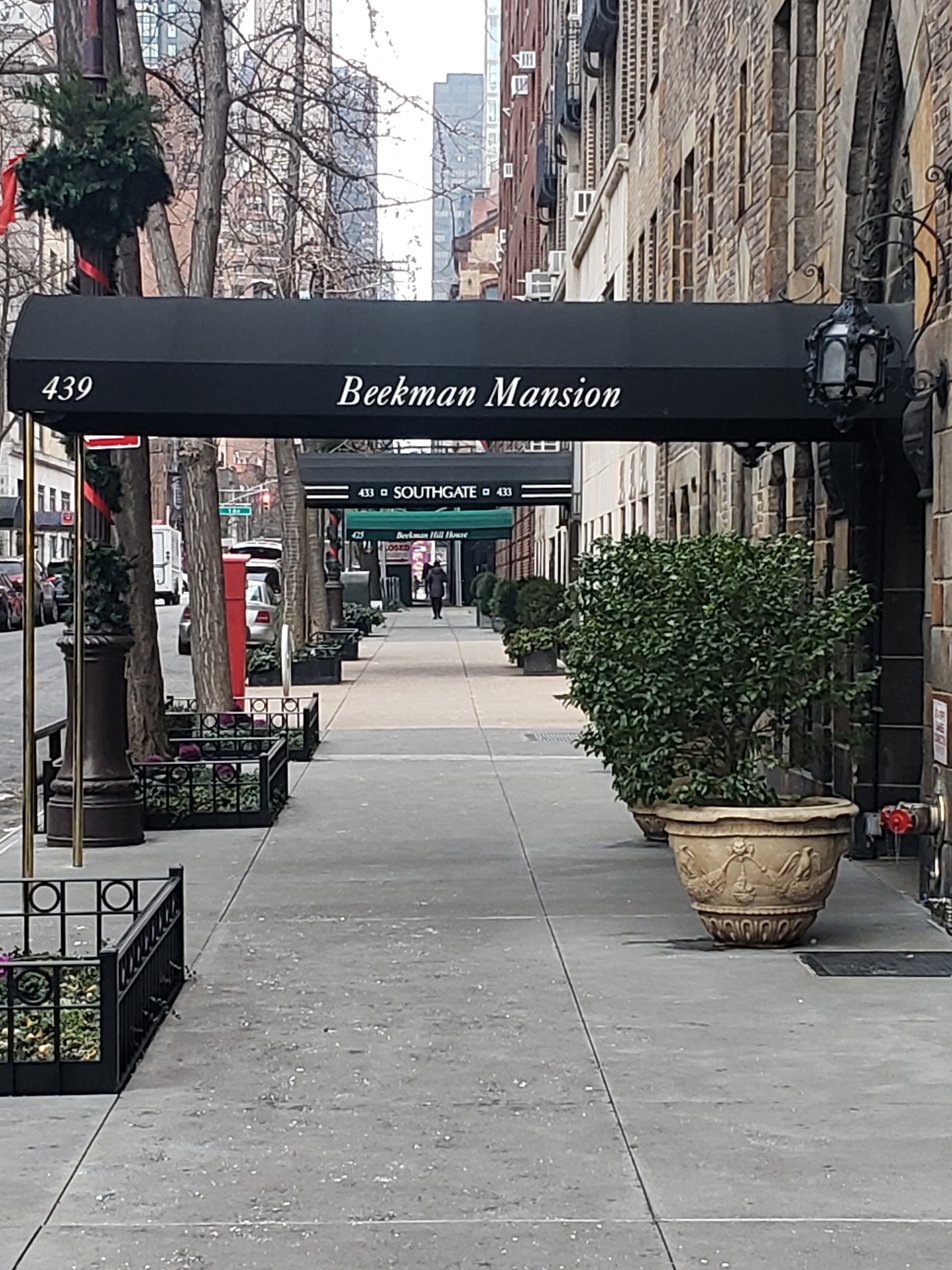
51st Street sidewalk looking west

Beekman is a small, exclusive residential neighborhood on the East Side of Manhattan in New York City. Its boundaries are First Avenue on the west, FDR Drive on the east, 51st Street on the north, and 49th Street on the south.

Centered on Beekman Place, it is located in the Turtle Bay neighborhood and runs two blocks along the East River and contains several UN missions and foreign consulates. It was named after the Beekman family, descendants of early Dutch settler Wilhelmus Beekman, who did well in New Amsterdam and became mayor of the city.

The neighborhood was the site of the Beekman family mansion, Mount Pleasant, which James Beekman built in 1765. Beekman was a descendant of Willem Beekman, for whom Beekman Street and William Street were named. Willem Beekman came from Zutphen, Netherlands, to the new colony of New Netherland and was one of the first influential settlers in the Dutch town of New Amsterdam. The British made their headquarters in the mansion for a time during the American Revolutionary War, and Nathan Hale was tried as a spy in the mansion's greenhouse and hanged in a nearby orchard. George Washington often visited the house during his presidency. The Beekman family lived at Mount Pleasant until a cholera epidemic forced them to move in 1854, but the home survived until 1874, when it was torn down to make way for the city grid.

Laid out in the 1860s, Beekman Place was initially flanked by four-story brownstone residences. It developed as a residential enclave because the topography was higher compared to the rest of the neighborhood. Samuel W. Dunscombe, who had previously been a minister, owned most land around Beekman Place at the time. James Beekman's family retained ownership of a small strip of land along the East River waterfront just east of Beekman Place. In 1865, when Beekman sold his family's land, he created a deed agreement that prohibited any structures on the plot from rising above 40 feet (12 m), the height of Dunscombe's retaining wall just east of Beekman Place. This restriction was meant to preserve views from the new buildings on Beekman Place.

51st Street begins at Beekman Place which is on a hill overlooking FDR Drive. The street continues for a few feet east of the intersection but the street sign refers to it as Peter Detmold Park (a reference to the park with a dog run at the bottom of the hill), which has a pedestrian footbridge over the FDR to an esplanade along the East River.

== Prominent locations ==
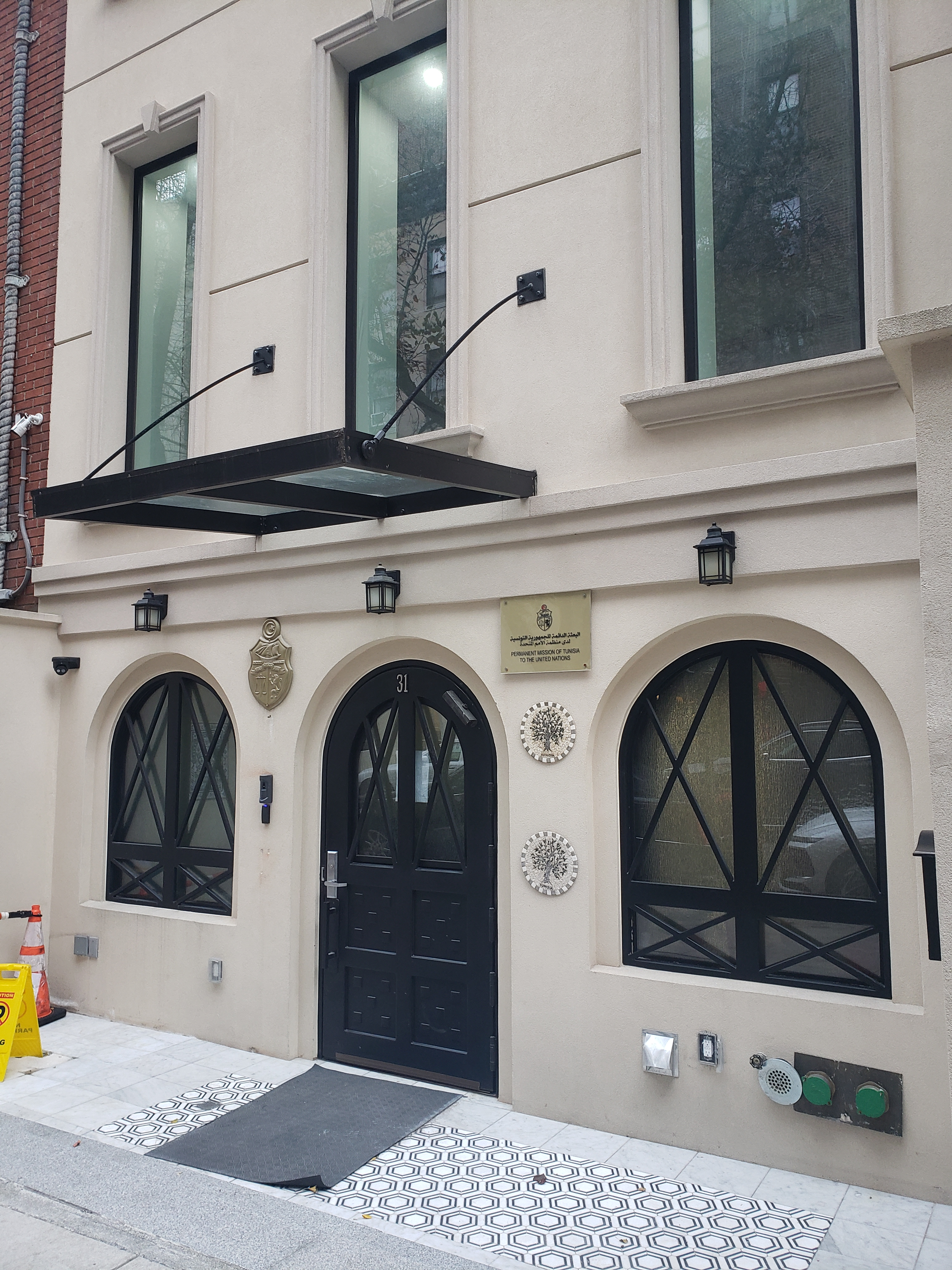
Tunisian Mission at 31 Beekman Place

- One Beekman Place, a 1929 co-op designed by Sloan & Robertson and Corbett, Harrison & MacMurray. It was built by a group headed by David Milton, husband of Abby Rockefeller and son-in-law of John D. Rockefeller, Jr. Early tenants here included "Wild Bill" Donovan of the Office of Strategic Services (OSS) and John D. Rockefeller III. In the 1950s, 1 Beekman Place was the residence of Sir Francis Rundall, the British consul-general in New York.
- The Luxembourg House, at 17 Beekman Place, is a five-story building designed by architect Harold Sterner for the former Secretary of Defense James Forrestal and was then later owned by the American composer Irving Berlin and his wife Ellin Mackay, an heiress. In 1990, it was purchased by The Grand Duchy of Luxembourg, which did a renovation that lasted three years. It is currently home to the Permanent Mission of Luxembourg to the United Nations and the Consulate General of Luxembourg in New York.
- 23 Beekman Place, a nine-story apartment building, includes a four-story penthouse designed by Modernist architect Paul Rudolph. The structure, constructed in the late 1860s, was originally a townhouse.
- 29 Beekman Place, a seven-story, limestone-and-brick mansion house of 12,260 square feet (1,139 m^{2}), was built in 1934 for CBS chief executive William S. Paley for his first wife, Dorothy Paley. Paley then rented the house to the health advocates Albert and Mary Lasker, who lived there for 35 years, until it was acquired in 1975 by Princess Ashraf Pahlavi of Iran, the twin sister of Mohammad Reza Pahlavi, the last shah of Iran. Ashraf Pahlavi lived in the home for many years; after her death in 2016, the home was the subject of legal proceedings.
- 31 Beekman Place, was formerly owned by the singer Tom Jones; it was later purchased for the Pahlavis' attaché in New York. In 1981, after the Iranian Revolution, ownership was transferred to a Dutch Antilles entity to prevent the home from being seized by the new Iranian government. In 1992, 31 Beekman was sold to the government of Tunisia for use as a diplomatic property; it is now the office of the Tunisian permanent mission to the United Nations.
- Beekman Bar and Books, a smoke-free former cigar bar with live music
- 351 East 51st Street, an apartment complex on one of several sites where Nathan Hale is believed to have been hanged, after the Battle of Long Island

== Notable residents ==
- German surrealist painter Max Ernst
- Actress Ethel Barrymore
- Greta Garbo
- Irving Berlin
- Ellin Mackay, an heiress and wife of Berlin
- CBS chief executive William S. Paley
- former Secretary of Defense James Forrestal
- Henry Kissinger
- John D. Rockefeller III
- Princess Ashraf Pahlavi of Iran
- Uma Thurman
- singer Tom Jones
