= 50th Street (Manhattan) =

West–east street in Manhattan, New York

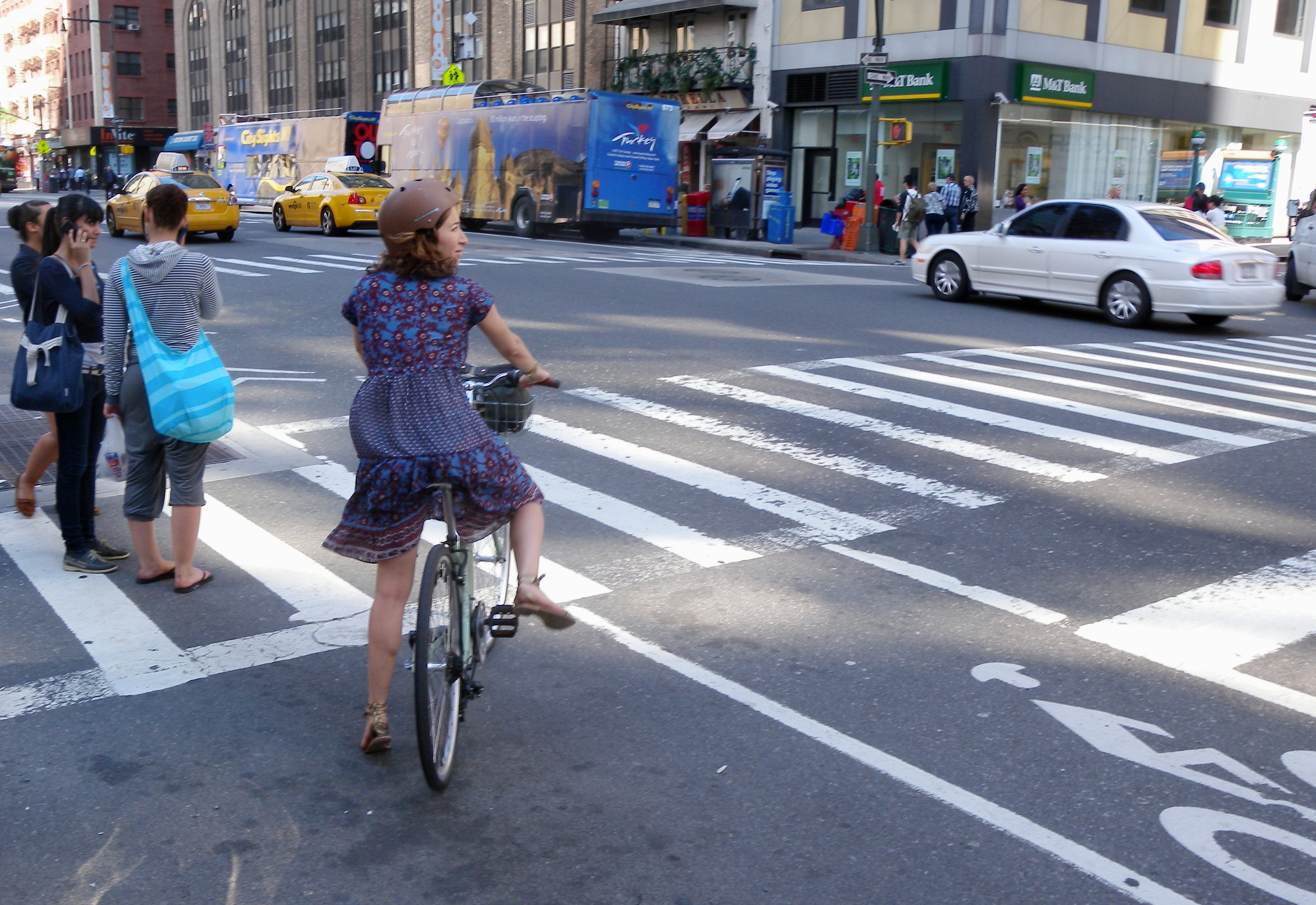
- 50th Street and 8th Avenue
- Maintained by: NYCDOT
- Length: 1.8 mi (2.9 km)
- Location: Manhattan, New York City
- Postal code: 10019, 10020, 10111, 10022, 10017
- Coordinates: 40.7583°N 73.9767°W
- West end: NY 9A (12th Avenue) in Hell's Kitchen
- East end: Beekman Place in Midtown East
- North: 51st Street
- South: 49th Street

Construction
- Commissioned: March 1811

50th Street is a street in the New York City borough of Manhattan. The street runs eastbound from 12th Avenue, across the full width of the island, ending at Beekman Place.

== Transportation ==
The M50 bus line serves 50th Street eastbound, with westbound service on 49th Street. There is no service east of Second Avenue.

The following subway stations serve the street, west to east:

- 50th Street at Eighth Avenue serving the A, C, and E trains
- 50th Street at Broadway serving the 1 and 2 trains
- 47th–50th Streets – Rockefeller Center at Sixth Avenue serving the B, D, F, <F>, and M trains

== Sites of interest ==
A telephone exchange building at 435 West 50th Street in Hell's Kitchen serves the northwestern section of Midtown Manhattan. The Park West Educational Campus is on 50th Street between Eleventh and Tenth Avenues. Five different high schools share the campus: Facing History High School, Manhattan Bridges High School, Food and Finance High School, High School of Hospitality Management, and Urban Assembly School for Design and Construction.

Worldwide Plaza is at the intersection with Eighth Avenue. The Paramount Plaza building at Broadway was used in Silent Movie as the location of the "Engulf and Devour" company. The Theater Center is also at the intersection with Broadway. The Circle in the Square Theater at the corner of West 50th Street and Broadway was the first Broadway theater to open in 50 years, when it debuted in 1971.

West 50th Street passes through Rockefeller Center between Seventh Avenue and Fifth Avenues. 1271 Avenue of the Americas, Radio City Music Hall, 30 Rockefeller Plaza, and 1251 Avenue of the Americas are respectively at the northwest, northeast, southeast, and southwest corners of Sixth Avenue and 50th Street. Also along 50th Street are 50 Rockefeller Plaza and the International Building, on the north side of 50th Street between Sixth and Fifth Avenues, and La Maison Francaise, on the south side of the same block.

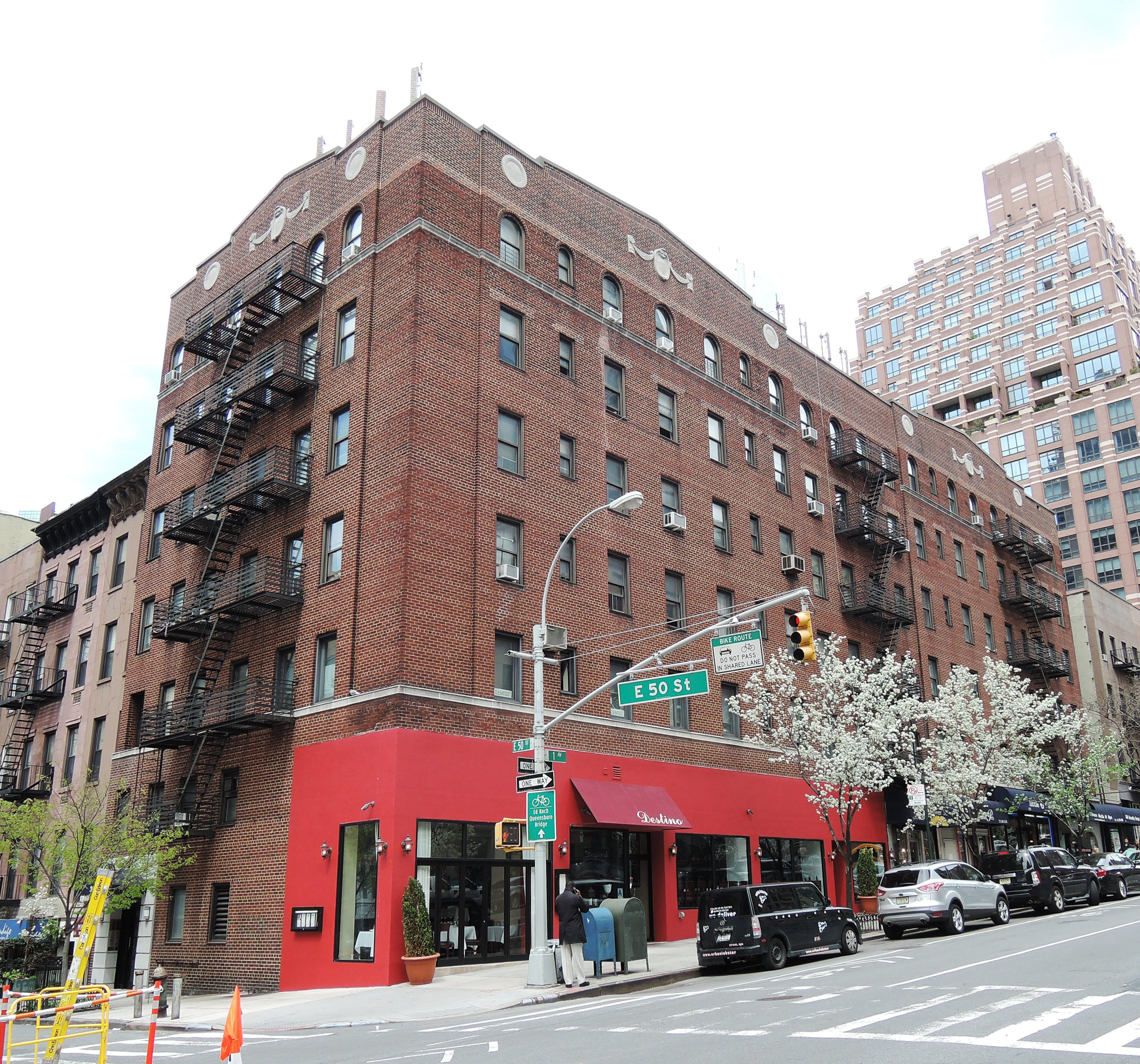
Apartment house, 1st Av & 50th St

On 50th Street between Fifth and Madison Avenues is the St. Patrick's Cathedral on the northern sidewalk, and 623 Fifth Avenue and 18 East 50th Street on the southern sidewalk. At the northeast corner with Madison Avenue are the Villard Houses and Lotte New York Palace Hotel. One block east, at the northeast corner with Park Avenue, is the Waldorf Astoria New York. The Beverly Hotel is at Lexington Avenue. The east end of the street, at Beekman Place, contains 23 Beekman Place.
