= Crisis: The Japanese Attack on Pearl Harbor and Southeast Asia =

Historical non-fiction book

- Title page for Crisis: The Japanese Attack on Pearl Harbor and Southeast Asia (1992)
- Author: Allan Beekman
- Language: English
- Genre: Non-fiction
- Publication date: 1992
- Publication place: United States

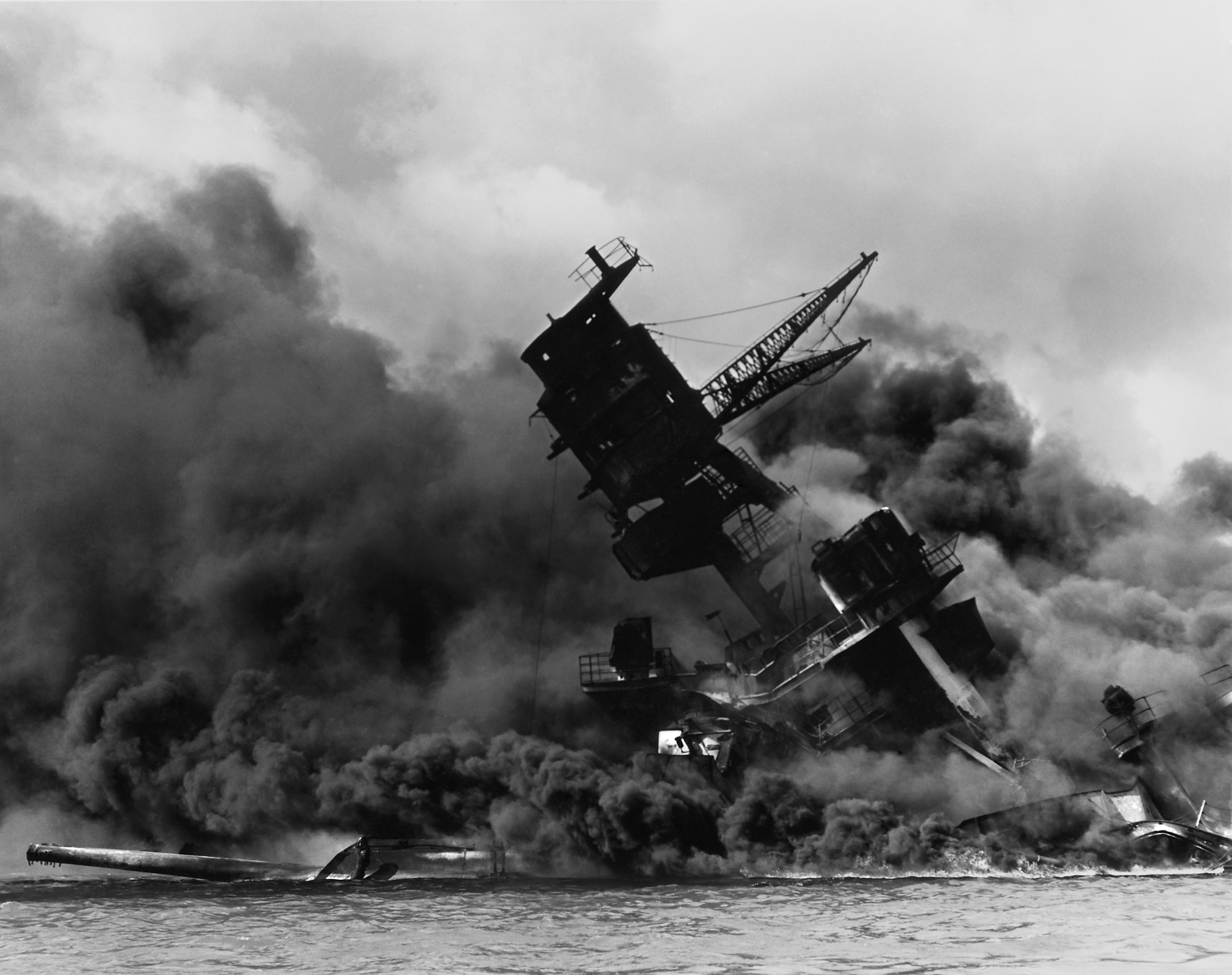
The USS Arizona burning after the Japanese attack on Pearl Harbor

Crisis: The Japanese Attack on Pearl Harbor and Southeast Asia is a 1992 book written by Allan Beekman, who also wrote The Niihau Incident and Hawaiian Tales. Crisis organizes into a coherent whole the elements that coalesced into the tragedy of Pearl Harbor.
