= Beekman Place =

Street in Manhattan, New York

- Interactive map of Beekman Place
- Namesake: Beekman family
- Maintained by: New York City Department of Transportation
- Location: Turtle Bay, Manhattan, New York City
- Postal code: 10022
- Coordinates: 40°45′12.29″N 73°58′2.33″W
- North end: East 51st Street
- Major junctions: Mitchell Place
- South end: Retaining wall above East 49th Street

Construction
- Commissioned: 1860

Other
- Known for: 23 Beekman Place

Beekman Place is a small street located in the Turtle Bay neighborhood on the East Side of Manhattan, New York City. Running from north to south for two blocks, the street is situated between the eastern end of 51st Street and Mitchell Place, where it ends at a retaining wall above 49th Street, overlooking the glass apartment towers at 860 and 870 United Nations Plaza, just north of the headquarters of the United Nations. "Beekman Place" also refers to the small residential enclave that surrounds the street itself. It is named after the Beekman family, who influenced New York City's development.

== History ==
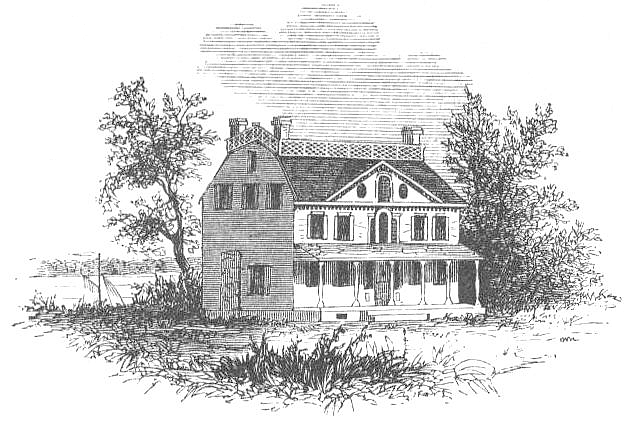
The Beekman house in 1860, from Valentine's Manual

The neighborhood was the site of the Beekman family mansion, Mount Pleasant, which James Beekman built in 1765. James Beekman was a descendant of Willem Beekman, for whom Beekman Street and William Street were named. Willem Beekman came from Zutphen, Netherlands, to the new colony of New Netherlands and was one of the first influential settlers in the Dutch town of New Amsterdam. The British made their headquarters in the mansion for a time during the American Revolutionary War, and Nathan Hale was tried as a spy in the mansion's greenhouse and hanged in a nearby orchard. George Washington often visited the house during his presidency. The Beekman family lived at Mount Pleasant until a cholera epidemic forced them to move in 1854, but the home survived until 1874, when it was torn down.

Beekman Place was laid out in the 1860s and was initially flanked by four-story brownstone residences. It developed as a residential enclave because the topography was higher compared to the rest of the neighborhood. Samuel W. Dunscombe, who had previously been a minister, owned most land around Beekman Place at the time. James Beekman's family retained ownership of a small strip of land along the East River waterfront just east of Beekman Place. In 1865, when Beekman sold his family's land, he created a deed agreement that prohibited any structures on the plot from rising above 40 feet (12 m), the height of Dunscombe's retaining wall just east of Beekman Place. This restriction was meant to preserve views from the new buildings on Beekman Place.

With the surge of immigration from Europe in the late 19th and early 20th century, the Lower East Side's slums expanded north. The Beekman Place area's well-off residents gave way to impoverished workers employed in the coal yards that lined much of the East River. In 1914, the Beekman estate appeared before the New York Supreme Court to remove the deed restriction on the waterfront lot, but after six years of litigation, they were unsuccessful. Consequently, in 1922, that lot was leased to a group that planned to erect a studio apartment and a 460-foot-long (140 m) parking garage on the site. Only the garage was ultimately built; it was rebuilt in 2000 after having deteriorated. The neighborhood's rehabilitation began in the 1920s, facilitated primarily by Anne Morgan of the Morgan banking family.

With the construction of the FDR Drive on the East River in the 1940s, the commercial uses of the waterfront were eliminated, and Beekman Place was isolated from the shoreline proper. Additionally, the government of New York City obtained riparian water rights for the shoreline between 52nd Street and 53rd Street. To compensate for Beekman Place's loss of access to the shoreline and replace two private footbridges that were located at the east end of East 52nd Street, next to the River House and The Campanile, the city government built a footbridge across the FDR Drive at 51st Street. The strip of land east of Beekman Place, along the FDR Drive, was opened as a park from 1942 to 1951. That park was renamed the Peter Detmold Park in 1972, after a cofounder of the Turtle Bay Association who had been murdered. Developer William Zeckendorf, who lived in 30 Beekman Place, gave up his land immediately south of the enclave in the mid-20th century to make way for the headquarters of the United Nations.

== Notable buildings ==
One Beekman Place, the 1929 co-op designed by Sloan & Robertson and Corbett, Harrison & MacMurray, is "the most prestigious Beekman Place apartment building"; It was built by a group headed by David Milton, husband of Abby Rockefeller and son-in-law of John D. Rockefeller, Jr. Early tenants here included "Wild Bill" Donovan of the Office of Strategic Services (OSS) and John D. Rockefeller III. In the 1950s, 1 Beekman Place was the residence of Sir Francis Rundall, the British consul-general in New York. The base of 1 Beekman Place contains a one-story garage facing east toward the FDR Drive and East River.

17 Beekman Place, named The Luxembourg House is a five-story building designed by architect Harold Sterner for the former Secretary of Defense James Forrestal and was then later owned by the American composer Irving Berlin and his wife Ellin Mackay, an heiress. Irving Berlin died here in 1989. In 1990, it was purchased by The Grand Duchy of Luxembourg, which did a renovation that lasted three years. In 2010, a book on the home was published and titled The Luxembourg House on Beekman Place: Three Portraits in Time. It is currently home to the Permanent Mission of Luxembourg to the United Nations and the Consulate General of Luxembourg in New York.

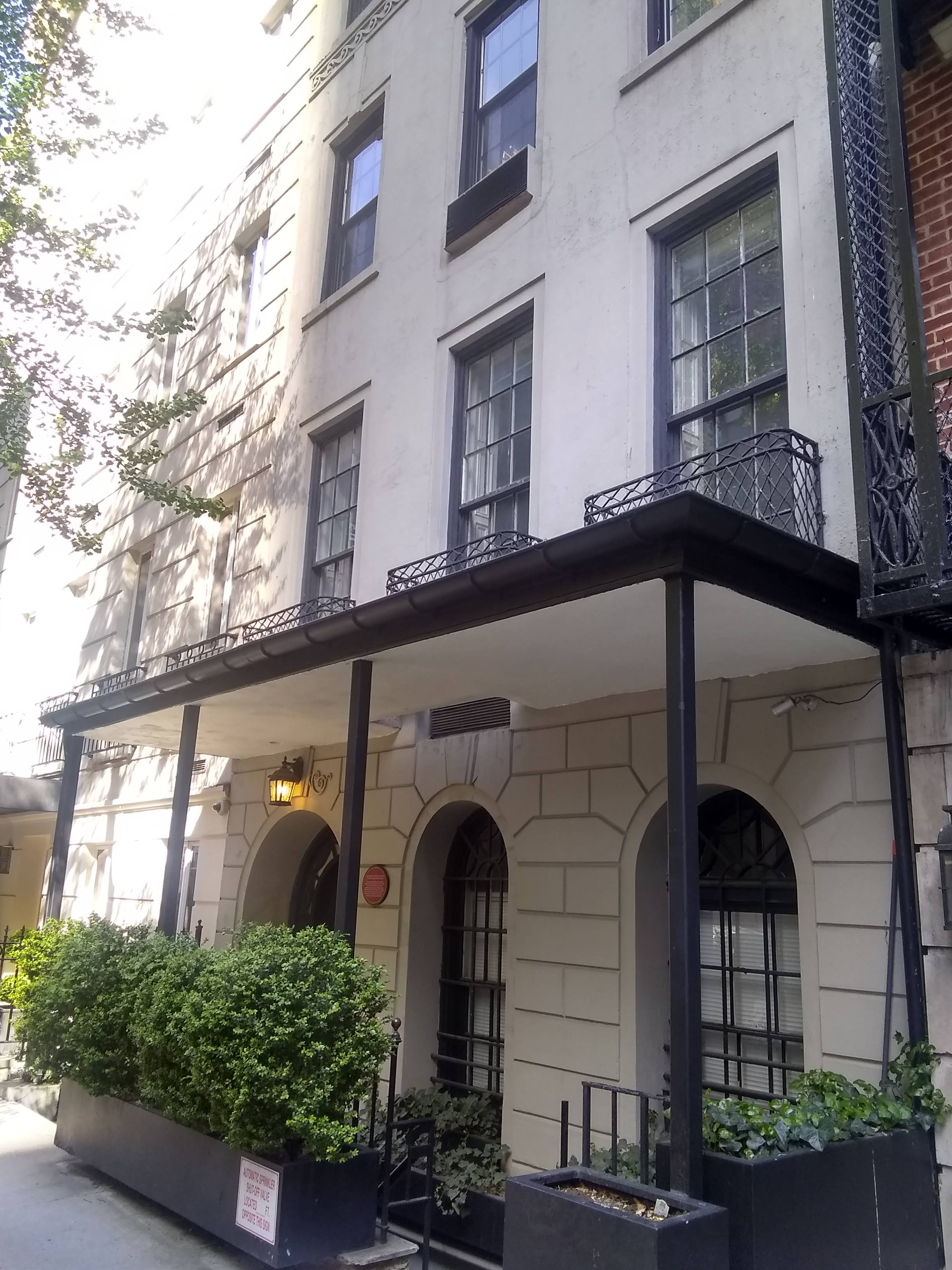
23 Beekman Place in 2021

23 Beekman Place, a nine-story apartment building, includes a four-story penthouse designed by Modernist architect Paul Rudolph. The structure, constructed in the late 1860s, was originally a townhouse. Shortly after moving into an apartment there in the early 1960s, Rudolph constantly made modifications to the house until his death in 1997. The penthouse was variously considered to have 15, 17, 27, or 30 distinct levels. 23 Beekman Place became a New York City designated landmark in 2010.

29 Beekman Place, a seven-story, limestone-and-brick mansion house of 12,260 square feet (1,139 m^{2}), was built in 1934 for CBS chief executive William S. Paley for his first wife, Dorothy Paley. Paley then rented the house to the health advocates Albert and Mary Lasker, who lived there for 35 years, until it was acquired in 1975 by Princess Ashraf Pahlavi of Iran, the twin sister of Mohammad Reza Pahlavi, the last shah of Iran. Ashraf Pahlavi lived in the home for many years; after her death in 2016, the home was the subject of legal proceedings. Although initially listed for $49 million, a real estate company finally sold the home in 2020, after several years on the market, for $11.5 million.

31 Beekman Place was formerly owned by the Welsh singer Tom Jones; it was later purchased for the Pahlavis' attaché in New York. In 1981, after the Iranian Revolution, ownership was transferred to a Dutch Antilles entity to prevent the home from being seized by the new Iranian government. In 1992, 31 Beekman was sold to the government of Tunisia for use as a diplomatic property; it is now the office of the Tunisian permanent mission to the United Nations.

== In popular culture ==
- In Irwin Shaw's The Eighty Yard Run, the main character lives here after blocking big Swedes and Poles.
- In Patrick Dennis's novel Auntie Mame (1955) and its various adaptations, the title character lives at 3 Beekman Place.
- In Sydney Pollack's movie The Way We Were (1973), Beekman Place symbolizes the WASPish cultural background of Hubbell Gardiner (Robert Redford's character) that is a continual irritant in his relationship with the Marxist Jew Katie Morosky (played by Barbra Streisand).
- In Tom Wolfe's novel The Bonfire of the Vanities (1987) and its movie adaptation (1990), the mayor says of Beekman Place: "They sit in their co-ops, Park Avenue, Fifth, Beekman Place, snug like a bug. Twelve-foot ceilings, a wing for them, one for the help."
- In Billy Joel's song "Close to the Borderline", the ninth track from the album Glass Houses (1980), he writes: "While the millionaires hide in Beekman Place, the bag ladies throw their bones in my face."
- In Netflix's Unbreakable Kimmy Schmidt, Kimmy becomes romantically interested in Logan Beekman, despite being unaware of the history of his esteemed family.
- In Alan Glynn's novel Receptor, political consultant Ray Sweeney visits retired CIA official Clay Proctor at his luxury apartment building in Beekman Place.
- Beakman, main character of You Can With Beakman and Jax and Beakman's World, is named after Beekman Place.
