= Sutton Place Synagogue =

Synagogue in Manhattan, New York

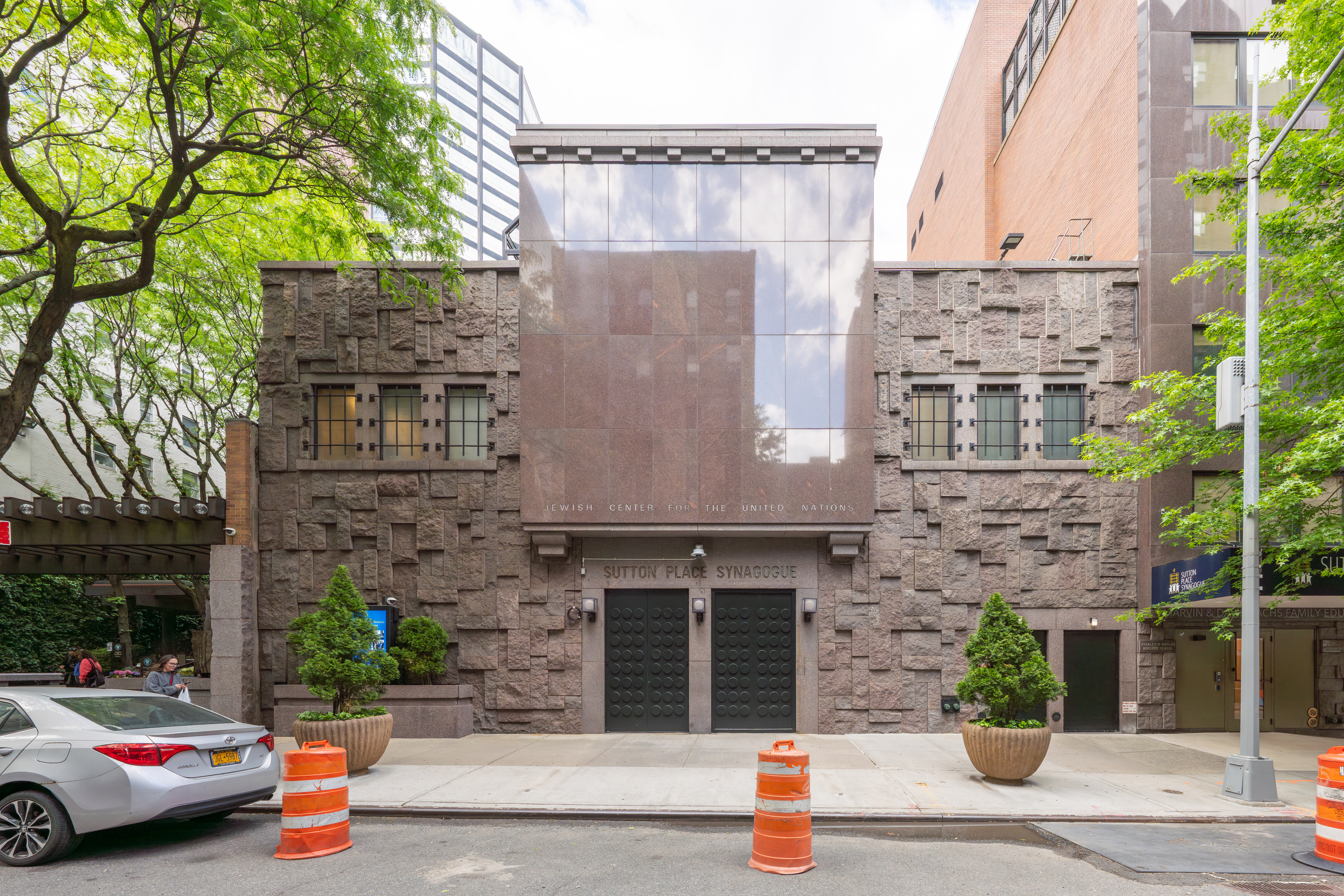
- (2026)

- Location in Manhattan

Religion
- Affiliation: Traditional Judaism
- Ecclesiastical or organizational status: Synagogue
- Leadership: Rabbi Ain; Rabbi David Levy; Cantor Alexandra Weiser
- Status: Active

Location
- Location: 225 East 51st Street, Midtown Manhattan, New York City, New York
- Country: United States
- Interactive map of Sutton Place Synagogue
- Coordinates: 40°45′22″N 73°58′09″W

Architecture
- Established: 1901 (as a congregation)
- Completed: 1906 (221 East 51st Street); 1975 (225 East 51st Street)

Website
- spsnyc.org

Sutton Place Synagogue, also called the Jewish Center for the United Nations, is a Traditional synagogue and congregation located at 225 East 51st Street in Midtown Manhattan, New York City, New York, United States.

== History ==
The congregation was founded in 1901 as Congregation "Beth Hamedrash Hachodosh Talmud Torah" (New House of Study for the Study of the Torah). Its first religious leader, Rabbi Meyer Freeman, published a book entitled "The Talmud" to raise money for a synagogue building. The congregation, originally founded as an Orthodox synagogue, acquired a synagogue building at 221 East 51st Street from Congregation Orach Chaim in 1906.

On January 24, 1965, Sutton Place Synagogue announced plans for the construction of a Jewish Center for the United Nations, complementing similar religious centers near the UN Headquarters. The announcement was made by U. S. Sen. Jacob K. Javits, the honorary chairman of the project.

The Inaugural Dinner, kicking off the Capital Campaign, was held at the Waldorf-Astoria Hotel on Sunday, May 2, 1965. The Honorary Chairmen were United Nations Ambassador Arthur Goldberg and US Senators Jacob K. Javits and Abraham A. Ribicoff.

Ambassador Goldberg said this in his opening remarks for the evening:

I am very much pleased to participate this evening in the Inaugural dinner for the Jewish Center for the United Nations. This dinner appropriately takes place on the 60th anniversary of the Sutton Place Synagogue Thus It both commemorates the Sutton Place Synagogue's venerable history of religious service and marks the extension of that worthy tradition through the creation of a center, which will serve both local and international Jewish communities. On an occasion such as this one, it is fitting to renew our dedication to the United Nations.

Abby Rockefeller, in 1971, purchased property from the synagogue to develop Greenacre Park and, as a result, the congregation purchased property on East 51st and 52nd Streets. The congregation moved to the property on East 52nd street while the construction occurred on the new building on 51st street.

On September 3, 1975, the congregation opened a new synagogue building and became known as "Sutton Place Synagogue - The Jewish Center for the United Nations."

From the late 1970s to early 1980s Sutton Place Synagogue began to establish itself as a destination for singles, young couples and families. Established by Rabbi David Kahane in 1981, the synagogue's Jewish Town Hall put the congregation at the forefront of political discourse. Cardinal-designte John O’Connor, Jackie Mason, Ellie Wiesel, Henry A. Kissinger, and Ariel Sharon all participated in a Jewish Town Hall at Suton Place Synagogue.

On December 11, 1985, the synagogue became the owners of 229 East 51st Street, the current site of the Sachs Family Educational Center housing the Kaplan Nursery School and the Nathaniel and Fanny Stricks Jackson Religious School.

== Clergy ==
In 1950, Rabbi David B. Kahane the youngest student to ever be granted a Rabbinical degree from Yeshiva University and a Columbia University P.H.D candidate became the congregation's spiritual and longest tenured leader. On May 12, 1951, Prime Minister David Ben-Gurion visited the then called East Fifty-First Street Synagogue, where he received blessings from Rabbi Kahane.

In 1991, Rabbi David Kahane had a stroke. His son, Rabbi Reuven Kahane, served as the synagogue Rabbi for almost three years before moving to Jerusalem and becoming a businessperson in Israel and New York.

Rabbi David Kahane died in 1996.

In 1994, the congregation elected Rabbi Richard Thaler to be its religious leader. Rabbi Thaler died on November 27, 1997.

In 1998, Rabbi Allen Schranz became the religious leader of Sutton Place Synagogue. During his time as Rabbi of the congregation he instituted a film salon series and short story course, inviting such authors as Pete Hamill and Stephen Dubner. Rabbi Schranz died on April 16, 2015.

Since 2012, the synagogue has been led by Rabbi Ain.

In 2023, the synagogue brought on Rabbi David Levy as their second Rabbi, serving as the Director of the Block Center for Jewish Exploration and Education. Followed by Cantor Luis Cattan, as the musical leader. Both partnering with Rabbi Ain.
