= 23 Beekman Place =

Apartment building in Manhattan, New York

Paul Rudolph Apartment & Penthouse
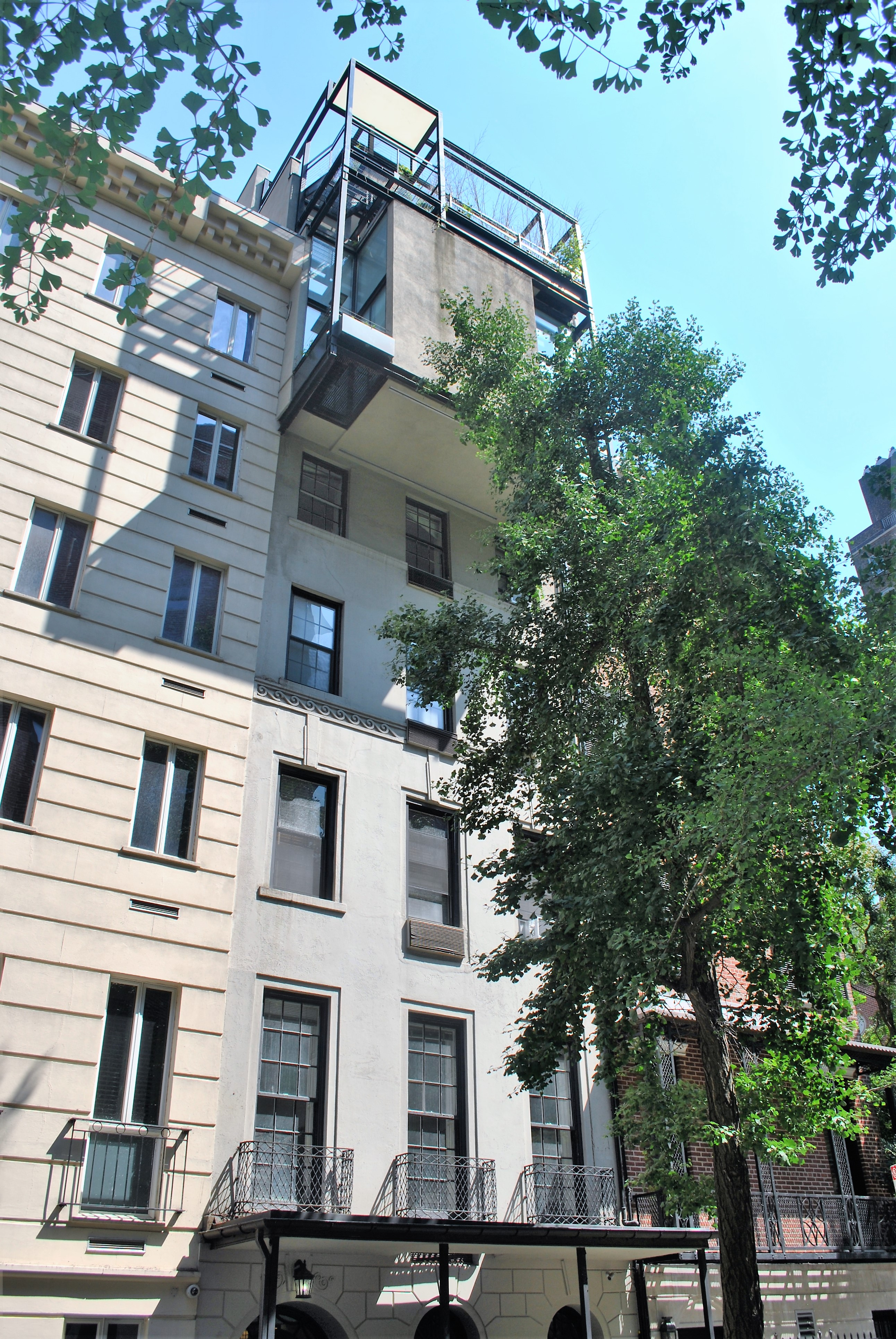
- The main facade of 23 Beekman Place
- Interactive map of the Paul Rudolph Apartment & Penthouse area

General information
- Type: Residential
- Architectural style: Modernist
- Location: Manhattan, New York, US, 23 Beekman Place
- Coordinates: 40°45′12″N 73°57′52″W
- Completed: c. 1869
- Renovated: 1960s to 1990s

Technical details
- Material: Stone, concrete, steel (facade)
- Floor count: 9
- Floor area: 9,296 ft^{2} (863.6 m^{2})

Renovating team
- Architect: Paul Rudolph

New York City Landmark
- Designated: November 16, 2010
- Reference no.: 2390

23 Beekman Place, also the Paul Rudolph Apartment & Penthouse, is an apartment building between 50th and 51st streets in the Turtle Bay neighborhood of Manhattan in New York City. Built c. 1869 as a five-story brownstone residence, it was substantially redesigned in the late 20th century by Paul Rudolph, an American architect and one-time dean of Yale University. It is one of the few known projects Rudolph designed in the city.

The house is part of a secluded residential enclave surrounding Beekman Place. It consists of the original brownstone residence, along with a four-story steel skeletal penthouse with concrete wall panels, which is cantilevered slightly over the street. The rear walls contain full-width windows with East River views, while the interiors contain high ceilings and open floor plans. Throughout his occupancy at the building, from the 1960s to 1990s, Rudolph constantly adjusted the interior layout. The penthouse originally received negative feedback from neighbors, who expressed concerns that it would draw excessive attention to the area and that it would block their own views of the river.

The building was originally a brownstone along with the other structures in the area. In the first half of the 20th century, it was occupied by actress Katharine Cornell and director and producer Guthrie McClintic, who were married. Starting in 1961, Rudolph leased a fourth-story apartment at 23 Beekman Place, and he ultimately bought the entire building outright in 1976. Following that, Rudolph redeveloped the building from 1977 to 1982, constructing the steel penthouse above the existing masonry apartments. After Rudolph died in 1997, the building was sold to the Boyd family and then to Steven Campus, who both renovated the interior. The New York City Landmarks Preservation Commission designated the house as a landmark in 2010.

== Site ==
The Paul Rudolph Apartment & Penthouse is at 23 Beekman Place in the Turtle Bay neighborhood of Manhattan in New York City. It is along the eastern sidewalk of Beekman Place, between 50th Street to the south and 51st Street to the north. The building has an area of 2,000 square feet (190 m^{2}), a frontage of 20 feet (6.1 m) along Beekman Place, and a depth of 100 feet (30 m). According to the New York City Department of City Planning, the building has a gross floor area of 9,296 square feet (863.6 m^{2}).

The land at 23 Beekman Place was once part of the country estate of James Beekman, a descendant of Dutch colonist Willem Beekman. Beekman Place, running two blocks from 49th to 51st Street, was laid out in the 1860s and was originally flanked by four-story brownstone residences. It had developed as a residential enclave because the topography was higher compared to the rest of the neighborhood. With the surge of immigration from Europe in the late 19th and early 20th century, the area's well-off residents gave way to impoverished workers employed in the East River's coal yards, although Beekman Place's rehabilitation began in the 1920s.

== Architecture ==
23 Beekman Place is designed as two distinct parts: the original five-story masonry structure, as well as a four-story penthouse addition over the front and back of the building. The original building comprises the slightly depressed first story and the second through fourth stories. The penthouse consists of the sixth through ninth stories. The west facade faces Beekman Place and is visible from 50th Street, and the east facade overlooks the FDR Drive and the East River.

The original structure, dating from the 1860s, was redesigned in the late 20th century by architect Paul Rudolph, a former chairman of Yale University's School of Architecture. Rudolph completed at least five other buildings in the city. (Note: Aside from 23 Beekman Place, these projects included 101 East 63rd Street and 246 East 58th Street in Manhattan, as well as Tracey Towers, Davidson Houses, and Middletown Plaza in the Bronx.) In his late career, Rudolph designed buildings in Southeast Asia, and his renovation of 23 Beekman Place included some aspects of these projects. Rudolph’s style was considered within the "second generation" modernists, and he generally respected pre-existing styles, including the structure of the existing brownstone at 23 Beekman Place. While technically an alteration, 23 Beekman Place is among New York City's few remaining structures designed by architects or artists as their own residences. Within Turtle Bay, other examples include the Morris B. Sanders Apartment and Lescaze House.

=== Facade ===
Rudolph experimented with industrial materials, such as concrete, even though he did not use it as a primary material in some of his major works. The penthouse was made of steel, the exposed sections of which he painted brown, thereby contrasting against the lighter concrete facade of the base. The concrete panels themselves were light in color, similar to the base.

==== Base ====
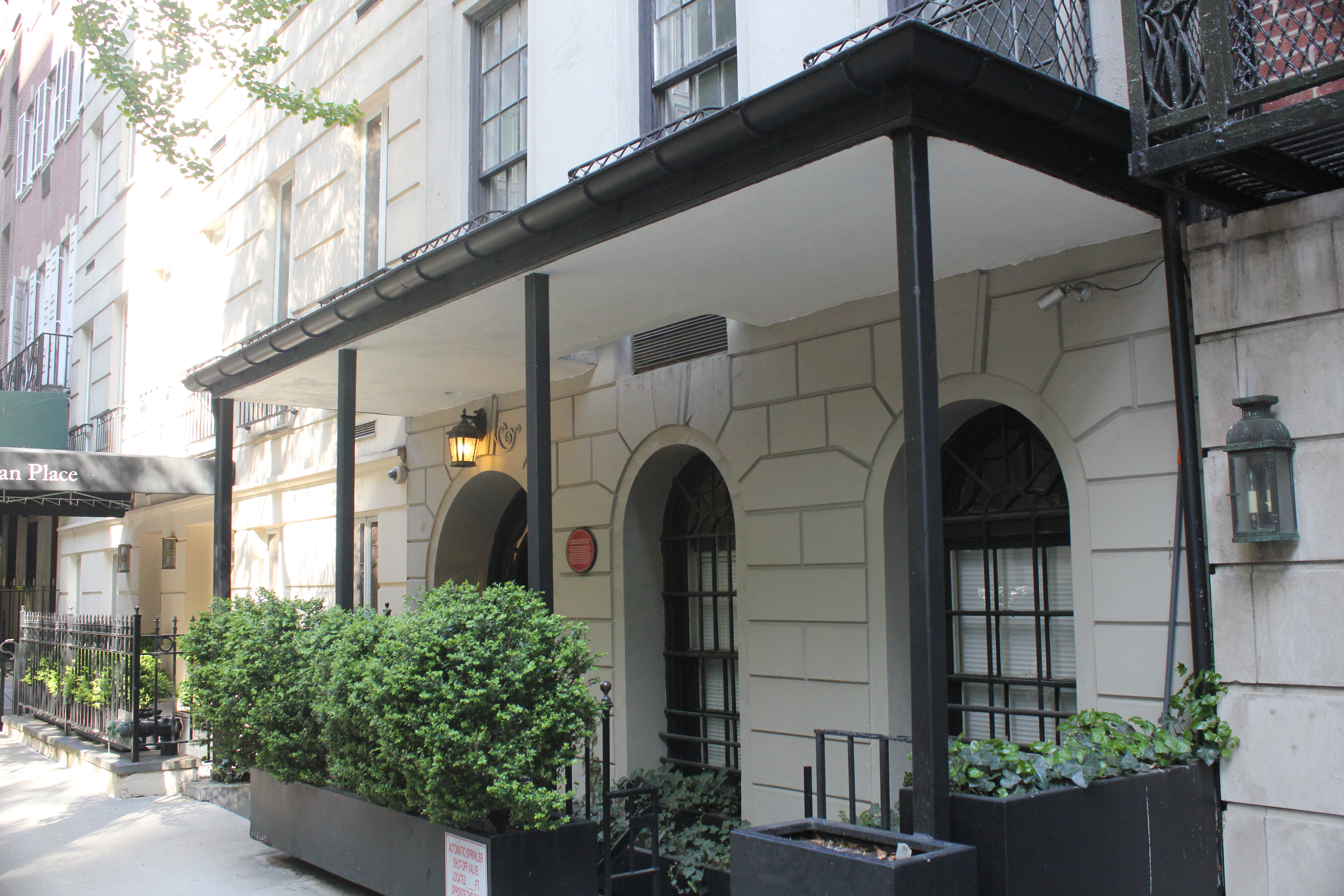
Portico

The first story, slightly depressed beneath sidewalk level, contains a rusticated-stone facade and three round-arched openings. The northernmost opening, on the left of the Beekman Place facade, contains an entrance doorway and is wider than the other two openings. The doorway is accessible by a set of steps descending from the sidewalk. The keystone above the doorway contains a lamp made of metal and glass, which in turn has decorative reliefs on either side of it. The entrance contains an arch, wood-paneled door designed in the Adamesque style, along with an arched transom surrounding the door. In front of the first story on Beekman Place, there are four columns surrounding a black-painted metal awning. The wall also has a plaque next to the door, as well as a camera next to the rightmost window.

On the west facade, there are three windows on each of the second through fifth stories. The windows on the second story consist of nine-over-nine windows, and the bottom portion of each window is covered by a short decorative metal railing. The third through fifth stories have double-hung windows with sills beneath them. Above each of the third-story windows are large keystones, which extend upward to a scalloped cornice running just beneath the fourth floor. The center window in each of the third through fifth stories has an air-conditioning unit underneath it. On the east facade of the first through fifth stories, there are balconies extending the full width of the house, overlooking the FDR Drive. The eastern part of the south facade at the fourth and fifth stories is visible from the southeast, with small rectangular windows on these stories.

==== Penthouse ====
The penthouse, on the sixth through ninth stories, consists of metal panels and steel I-beams, as well as concrete-panel walls. Along the west side of the house, the penthouse cantilevers about 5 feet (1.5 m) over Beekman Place. The bottom of the cantilever has a grate on the left (north) and an empty opening on the right (south). The north and south walls of the cantilever have several concrete panels each while the west wall has one large concrete panel. The cantilever's roof contains a terrace on the south side and a staircase between the seventh and eighth floors on the north side. The cantilever was meant to provide extra space for the guest room, as well as for the terrace staircase, but it also served to increase privacy for the top floors. The cantilever was unusual for the largely residential area around it, although Rudolph had often included cantilevers in his previous work. As he had written in 1954, Rudolph disliked the "tyranny of the endless streets" and wished for some designs to overhang the street to create an aesthetic point of interest.

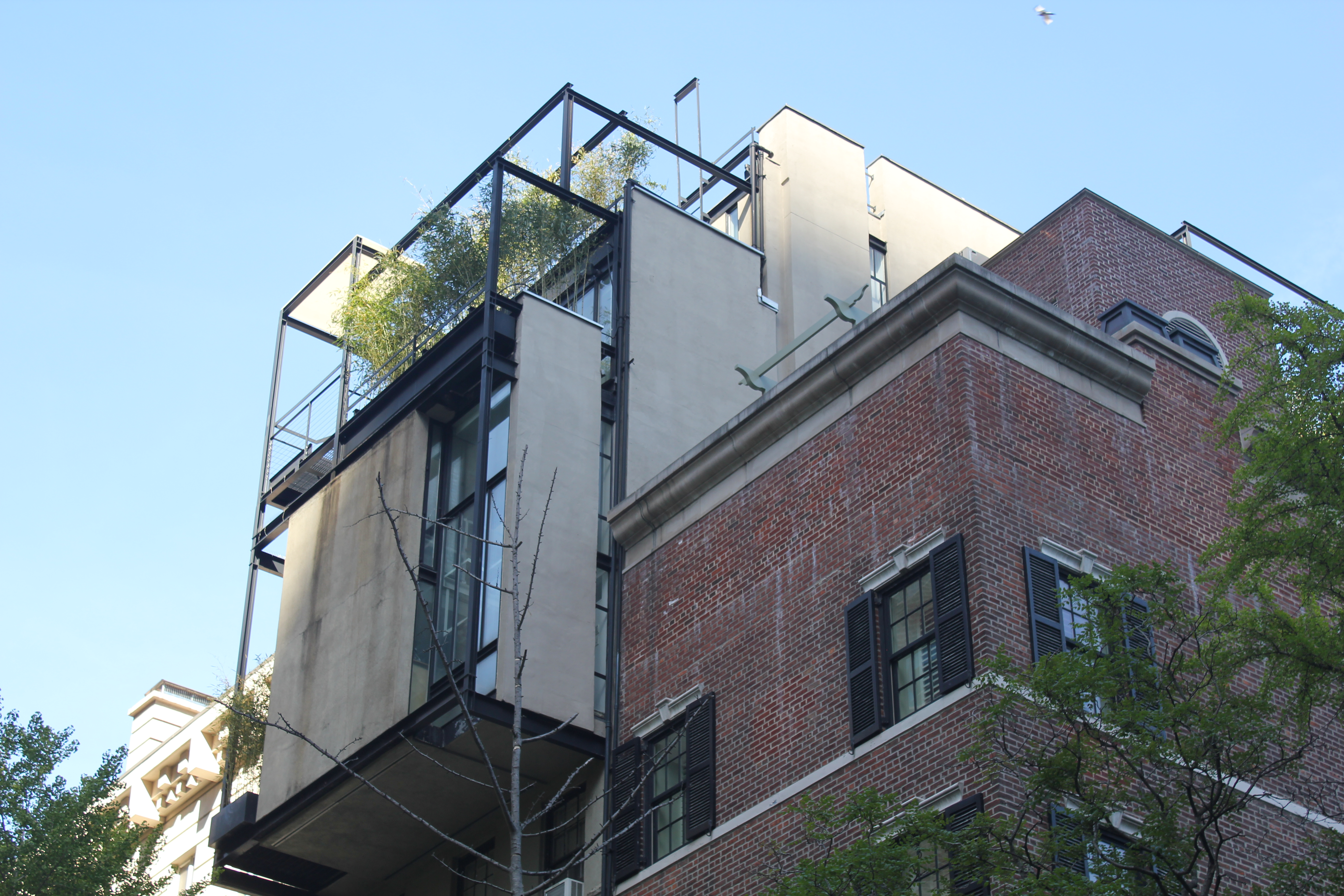
Penthouse on Beekman Place

The rear of the penthouse contains full-width balconies facing the FDR Drive, similar to those at the base. The eastern end of the sixth floor's south wall contains a small rectangular window, visible from the southeast, while the eastern end of the seventh floor's south wall contains a wide rectangular window separated by vertical mullions and glass panes. The eastern end of the penthouse's northern facade is partially visible and consists of a steel frame. The cantilevers of the penthouse were meant to resemble a "floating platform" overlooking the East River. The penthouse has five levels of terraces, which Rudolph hung with plants and other greenery to blunt the effect of the steel frame. According to one of his associates, Rudolph initially struggled to create a satisfactory arrangement of vegetation, but the plants were "full and abundant" before he died. In total, there are six terraces.

The penthouse includes one terrace with a metal-grating floor overhanging the street several stories below, in what Progressive Architecture magazine called "a gantry from nowhere". William Grindereng, who once stayed in Rudolph's apartment while the latter was on a trip, found the views to be "really scary". According to Grindereng, "I mentioned this to Rudolph when he came back. He said, 'Yes, I’m afraid to go out there myself.'"

=== Interior ===
When Rudolph moved into the house in the 1960s, he configured his fourth-floor apartment with mirrors, exposed lighting, and curtains composed of plastic discs. Three windows at the rear of the fourth floor were combined into one large window. The curtains consisted of nylon wires with disk mirrors, which allowed the illumination of the interior to be shown at night, while making it nearly invisible from the outdoors during the day. Rudolph also installed a grand piano in front of the entrance to his apartment. To further personalize his space, he installed part of a billboard along one wall of his bedroom, as well as posters from gasoline companies along his kitchen wall. Rudolph also built his own bookshelves; installed plastic furniture, panels, and doors to give a united character to his small apartment; and decorated his spaces in white. His living room had a cantilevered seating platform, and his furnishings included kid-fur carpets as well as transparent-glass-topped tables. Low cantilevered platforms in his living room had lighting beneath, giving the impression that the platforms were floating.

In the 1970s, Rudolph greatly redesigned the entire house and built the penthouse. During this renovation, he installed beige-carpeted floors and platforms, with plastic-tube lighting inlaid in the floors and bookshelves. The fireplace in his bedroom was also clad with mirrors. In the upper stories was a Jacuzzi, the bottom of which contained a skylight looking down some 30 feet (9.1 m). In the guest bedroom, the sink contains a skylight looking down into another bedroom, while the shower stall has glass doors that open onto a balcony above the street. Rudolph likened the shiny spaces to "living in a milk bottle". Rudolph largely eschewed furniture, opting instead for built-in furnishings, such as a daybed with pillows that could be attached to springs. The primary materials used were painted brown steel, metal beams, concrete panels, acrylic, and mylan. When contractors renovated the building in the 1970s, they found a piece of sheetrock with the words melamine everything, referring to the melamine used in the kitchen and likely dating to his 1960s fittings.

Rudolph's penthouse residence was characterized largely by obscured boundaries, which was in part due to its shiny materials and multilevel living spaces. The elevator from ground level to his residence, which could fit one person at a time, was reached by a passageway with niches that were lit up and decorated with toy soldiers. The elevator cab itself had no ceiling, along with transparent walls and floors; it was removed in the early 2000s. The living spaces also have very few walls. On the sixth and seventh stories, the portion of the penthouse facing Beekman Place had a guest room. The lucite bathtub hanging above the kitchen was a very popular aspect of 23 Beekman Place, as the base of the tub is translucent. The stairs had no railings or risers, which at one time scared Rudolph's housekeeper. The writer Joseph Giovannini recalled visiting the house in the 1980s and placing a wine glass on what he assumed to be a transparent shelf, only for it to fall three stories. Giovannini said that another guest was once taken away on a stretcher after becoming disoriented, an event Rudolph recalled "with mischievous glee".

The penthouse was organized in four linked stories, but the center of the apartment is placed on various terraces and platforms. The penthouse was variously considered to have 15, 17, 27, or 30 distinct levels. When Rudolph had renovated the building in the 1970s, the front of the sixth floor was occupied by the penthouse's guest room, but the rear was part of another unit spanning the fifth and sixth floors. As of 2017, the penthouse has one bedroom each on the sixth, eighth, and ninth floors; a living room on the seventh floor; a dining area and kitchen on the eighth floor; and front and rear terraces on the seventh through ninth floors. There are three additional duplex residences beneath the penthouse. The lower floors had been modified to a lesser extent than the penthouse. After Rudolph's death, the lowest unit remained largely in the same condition as it was after World War II.

== History ==
=== Early history ===
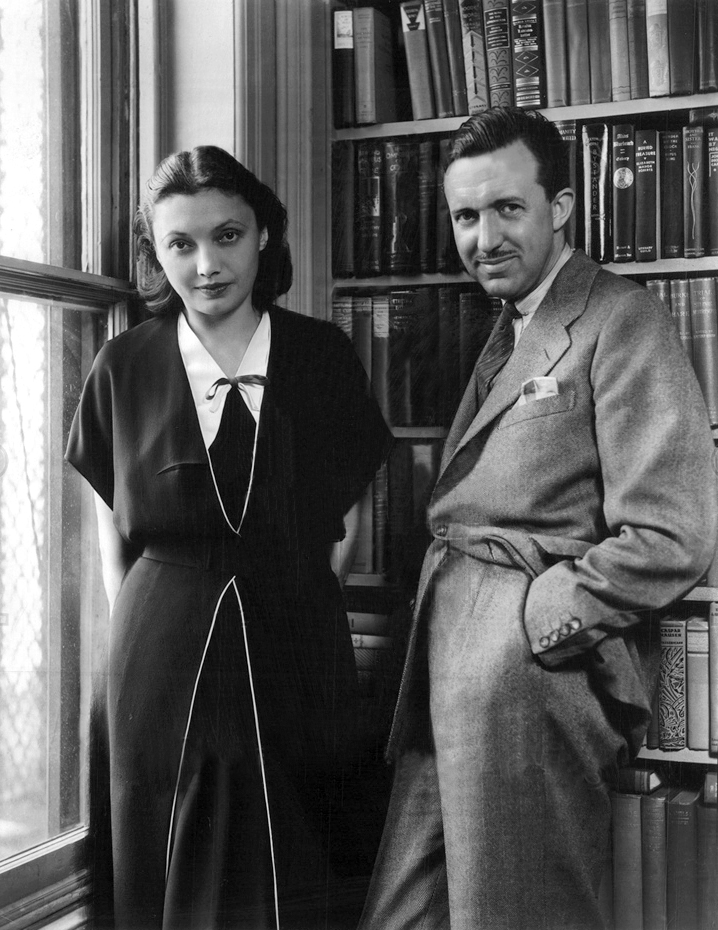
Katharine Cornell and Guthrie McClintic in the library of their home at 23 Beekman Place (1933)

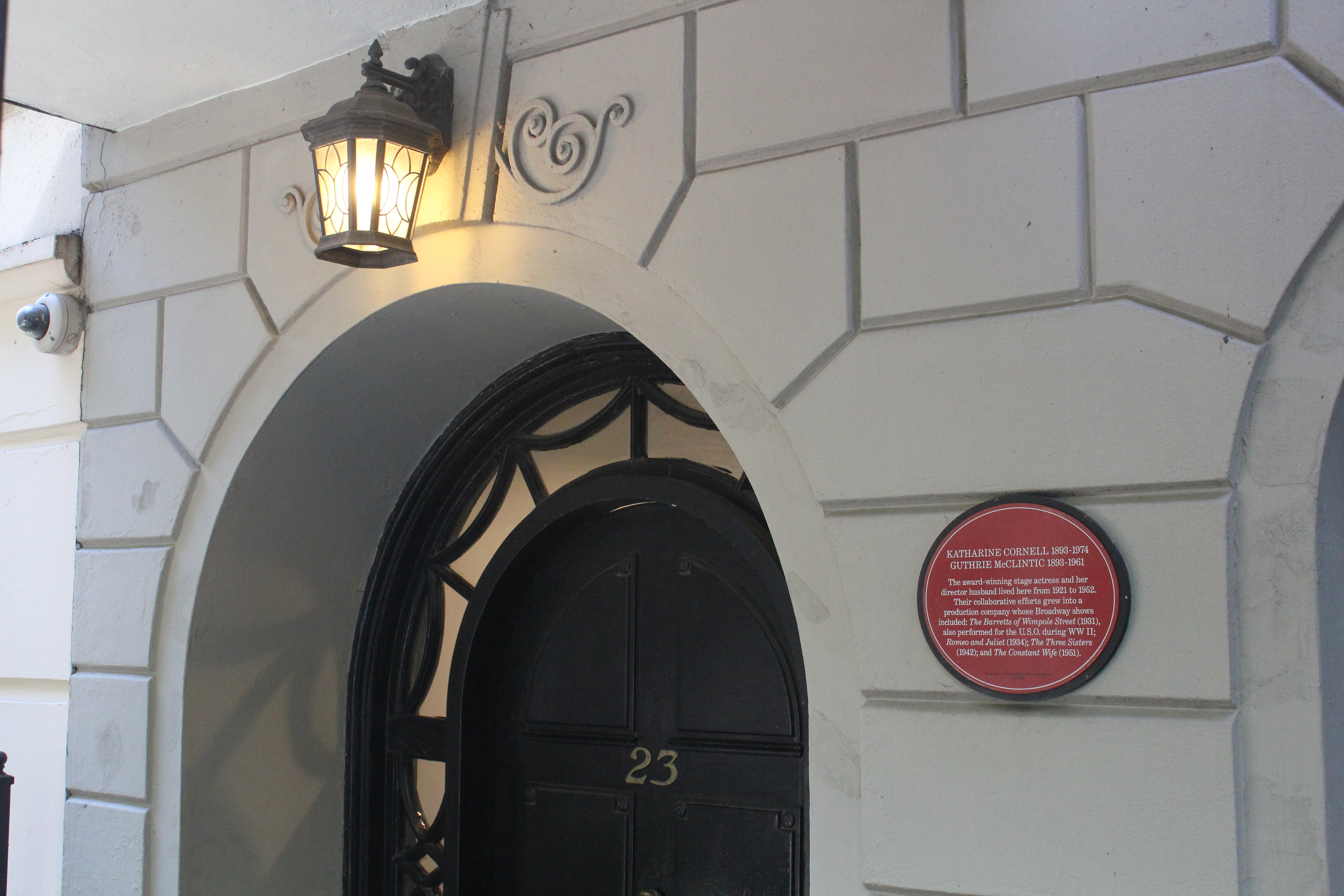
A Historic Landmarks Preservation Center Cultural Medallion at 23 Beekman Place honors the residence of Cornell and McClintic from 1921 to 1952.

23 Beekman Place was constructed in the 1860s, like the surrounding townhouses, and originally contained a stoop in front of it. According to the Department of City Planning, the building was completed c. 1869. Maria L. Higgins owned the town house until 1906, when she sold it to Charles P. Schmid, secretary of the Schaefer Brewing Company. Either Schmid or Higgins eliminated the stoop from the original structure and divided the townhouse into two apartments. Schmid and his family lived in the building in the 1910s, as did Roger Howson (later chief librarian at Columbia University) and his family. Schmid died at his home in 23 Beekman Place in 1911. His widow mortgaged the property in 1915 to Rudolph J. Schaefer, head of the Schaefer Brewing Company. In 1922, actress Katharine Cornell and her director-producer husband Guthrie McClintic purchased 23 Beekman Place from the Schmid family. Cornell later recalled that the area was, at the time, "practically a slum". The house had been purchased with McClintic's income from The Dover Road, the first production he had directed. According to the New York City Landmarks Preservation Commission (LPC), the couple's private lives were relatively unknown in comparison to their public appearances. In 1929, architect Franklin Abbott designed the first alteration for the building. According to city documents, the neo-classical detailing and the ground-story round-arched windows were installed on the facade at this time. The basement was extended eastward and the garden was surrounded by a wall. The LPC indicates the service entrance, as well as the metal canopy in front of the entrance, were likely added at this time. The New York Times characterized this as a "more modest" alteration than others that were conducted on Beekman Place in the same era.

By the 1930 United States census, Cornell and McClintic lived with a butler, a cook, and likely one tenant. The couple had three residences by the 1940s: their Beekman Place townhouse; a weekend house at Sneden's Landing on the Hudson River in Palisades, New York; and a vacation home at Martha's Vineyard. Their Beekman Place apartment was used for at least a few organized events, including a 1941 visit by a gardening club. According to a guest during that decade, Cornell lived on the third floor and McClintic on the fourth. Cornell and McClintic moved to their Palisades home in 1951 and sold the Beekman Place townhouses two years later. The building was sold by Georgia M. Williams to an unknown buyer in May 1955. The next year, Philomena Marsciano bought the house for investment. Up until the 1960s, the five-story residence was like the others on the block, with its rusticated base and its metal entrance canopy.

=== Rudolph residence ===
==== Initial work ====
Paul Rudolph leased the fourth-floor apartment from Marsciano in 1961, and he began making modifications to the apartment soon afterward. At the time, he was still living in New Haven, Connecticut, serving as department head at the Yale School of Architecture. He initially may have used the apartment as a workplace or weekend residence before making it his main residence in 1965. Rudolph also designed and opened his first Manhattan office at 26 West 58th Street around the same time. Rudolph's initial changes to his Beekman Place apartment were meant to maximize use of the relatively small space, as his unit only covered 800 square feet (74 m^{2}).

His first series of renovations was completed by 1967, when he was still largely based in New Haven. Rudolph ultimately remained at 23 Beekman Place for the rest of his life. Rudolph opened an office at 54 West 57th Street after his 58th Street office was demolished in 1968 to make way for the Solow Building. It was at the 57th Street office that Rudolph planned further alterations to the Beekman Place townhouse. Rudolph continued to modify the designs, being not completely satisfied by them. Rudolph wrote in 1978 that his first design of the interior was conceptual, being "never more than a series of sketches, or studies, for other projects".

==== Further renovations ====
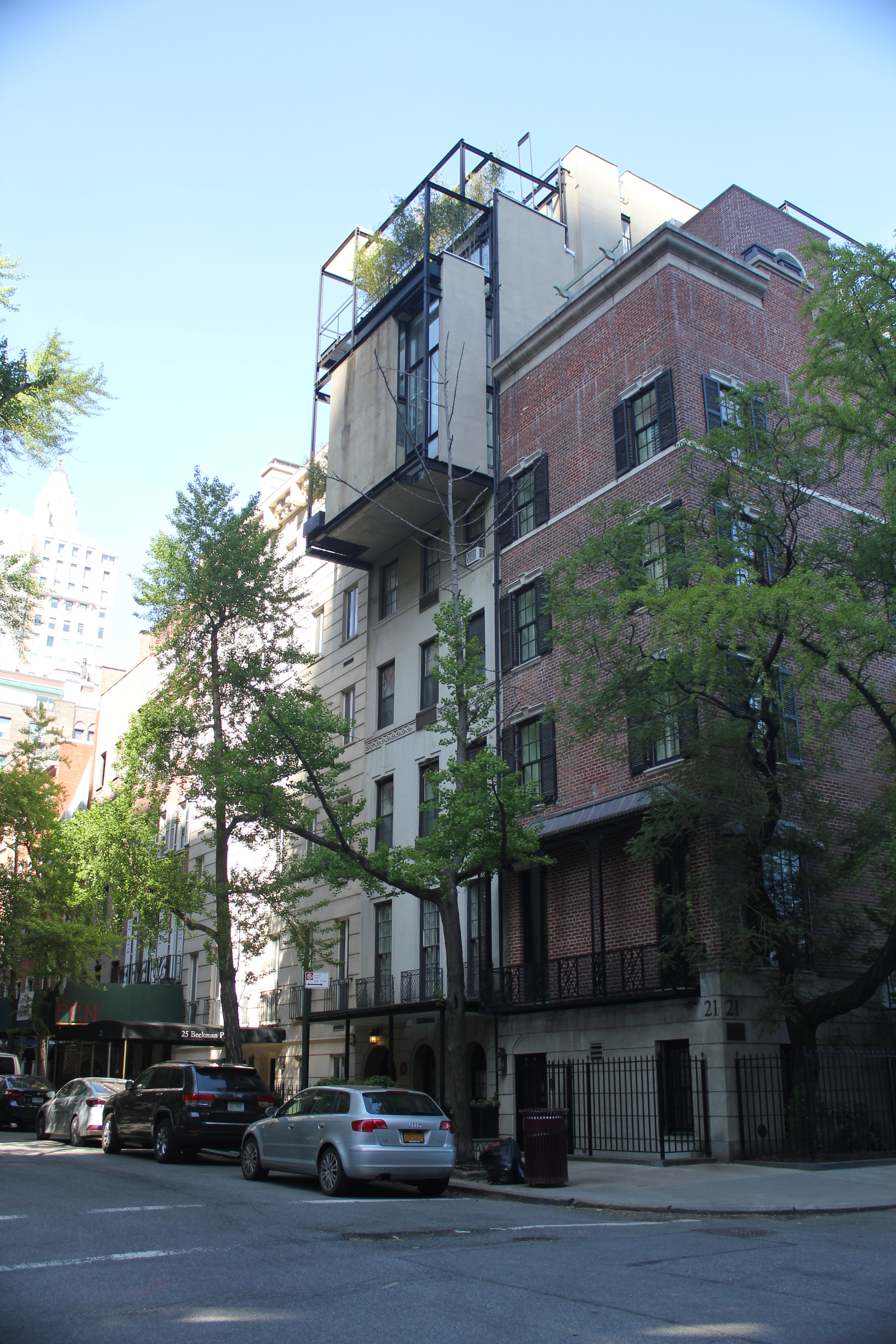
Viewed from 50th Street

Amid a weak real estate market in Manhattan, Rudolph bought 23 Beekman Place in October 1976 for $300,000. Afterward, Rudolph filed plans for an alteration, projected to cost $120,000. The New York City Department of Buildings (DOB) rejected his plans in July 1976. The areas of the second to fourth stories would increase by 25 percent, more than what was allowed by zoning regulations. In February 1977, the proposal was presented to the New York City Board of Standards and Appeals (BSA), which had authority to override legislative limits. Following the hearing, the BSA approved the plans, and the Department of Buildings granted a permit in June 1977. Donald Luckenbill, an architect at Rudolph's firm, designed the renovations, while Marco Martelli was the general contractor and Vincent J. DeSimone was the structural engineer.

The renovation involved destroying the rear wall and installing a new facade of steel and glass, which extended up to 17.5 feet (5.3 m) past the previous lot line. A new penthouse was constructed and designed to support a number of terraces and annexes. Rudolph had proposed a rooftop swimming pool, as well as some rooms without windows, but the DOB and BSA rejected those ideas. The contractors first repaired standing brick walls that had been deemed unsafe. After that, the penthouse was constructed starting in late 1977 and continued through the following year. Almost all of the interior work for the rentable apartments was finished by the end of 1978, and all the necessary materials for the penthouse were lifted to the fifth floor. During 1979 and 1980, the DOB issued interim certificates of occupancy, with the permanent certificate of occupancy being issued in January 1982. Following the renovations, the building had five residential units: four at the base as well as a penthouse unit. Rudolph continued to modify the interiors for the rest of his life. Some writers attributed the penthouse as having been completed at a later date, such as Michael Sorkin, who cited the work as being finished in 1988.

Rudolph continued to work and live at 23 Beekman Place until his death in 1997. Before he died, Rudolph had been discussing the possibility of having a nonprofit organization take over the building and maintain his interior features, but he had been unable to do so. Consequently, the house was placed on sale for $6.25 million, and property agent Sotheby's placed advertisements in Southeast Asia, where Rudolph had been active at the end of his life. The profit from the sale was to be donated to the Library of Congress, which had almost 1,500 renderings for the house. In the meantime, the vacant space was used for fashion shoots. By late 1998, the asking price had been reduced to $5.65 million. Critics and preservationists raised concerns that the house might be demolished. At the time, since the house was not designated as a city landmark, a buyer could theoretically perform any alterations to the interior. Sotheby's received "six or eight" offers, many of whom reneged upon learning of the costs of restoration. Among those interested in buying the house were Joseph Holtzman, editor of Nest magazine.

=== 21st century ===
==== Boyd ownership ====
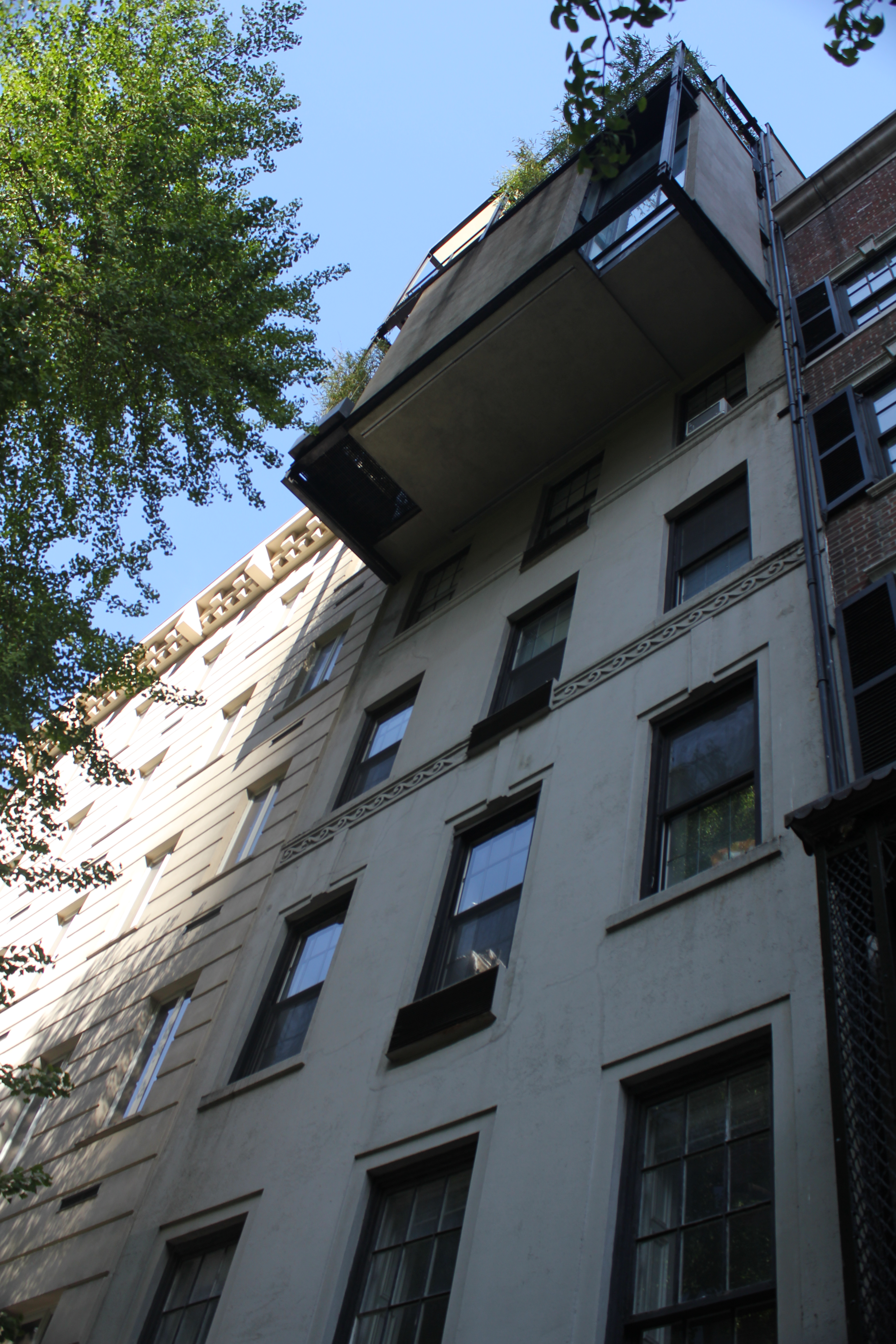
Looking up from sidewalk level

Rudolph's estate sold the house in May 2000 for $5.5 million to Gabrielle and Michael Boyd, architectural historians from California who moved into the space with their two young sons. The Boyd family expressed appreciation for Rudolph's work and promised to restore the interior to match his intent as closely as possible. The next year, the Boyds renovated the building to convert the apartments into a single-family unit. The three duplex units, which Rudolph had less extensively changed compared to the penthouse, were combined into the Boyd family residence.

The renovation was performed in conjunction with Thomas Stephens. The Boyd family covered the translucent bathtubs and sinks, added a wall, and removed the small elevator to the penthouse. The Boyds wanted to buy Rudolph's furniture from his estate, which had reneged and sold the furniture off. As a result, the family brought various pieces of furniture from different architects and artists. They also installed their art collection throughout the house. The Boyds partially modified the staircases with frosted-acrylic railings and removed chromed laminate strips from the beams and columns. The fourth story was converted into a playroom. One duplex unit was used for the Boyds' library, another duplex became a seating area, and a third unit with high ceilings became a recording studio. The renovations were largely conducted closely to Rudolph's design ideal, and details such as the white kitchen shelves were preserved.

The neighboring property to the south, at 21 Beekman Place, was purchased by Florida businessman William R. Rupp in June 2001. Soon afterward, Michael Boyd became involved in a dispute with Rupp, initially over the need for the Boyds to dismantle an air conditioner outside number 23 for construction at number 21. Rupp erected a brick wall between 21 and 23 Beekman Place in August 2001, blocking some windows on the third through fifth stories, prompting the Boyds to file a complaint with the city government. By November 2001, the Boyds had placed the building on sale for $10.5 million, with plans to move back to California. The dispute with Rupp meanwhile became acrimonious; Michael Boyd recalled that his wife sprayed water onto Rupp's workers, prompting Rupp to call the police and accuse them of throwing bricks. Michael Boyd also claimed that Rupp was throwing dog feces into his family's backyard, which Douglas Elliman executive Jan Hashey corroborated when she was selling the house for the Boyds.

==== Ruppert LLC ownership ====
In January 2003, videoconferencing executive Steven Campus bought the house for $6.3 million. According to New York City Department of Finance records, the deed was officially conveyed to an entity named Ruppert LLC. (Note: According to Curbed, the sale to Ruppert LLC was for $6.325 million and took place in 2002.) Campus began planning a renovation of the house to convert the penthouse unit into a usable space and preserving some of its design features. This work necessitated replacing rusted steel and remedying water damage, which involved going through Rupp's house. Architects Andrew Bernheimer and Jared Della Valle were commissioned to renovate the penthouse apartment. The renovation was completed in 2006. The renovations to the interior were controversial, with some critics speaking against the alterations. Conversely, some of the renovations were for practical purposes, such as the air-conditioning and the sprinkler system. Della Valle and Bernheimer received awards for their work on the apartment and, in a New York magazine article in 2006, referred to the apartment as a "laboratory for its designer".

The renovations had also encountered problems over the continuing dispute with Rupp. Campus alleged that in 2003, Rupp had repeatedly refused to allow the workers to access the property, then scared the workers away with his dog, and finally extended the brick wall until it reached the roof of the penthouse. This prompted Campus to file a lawsuit in the New York Supreme Court in December 2004, alleging that the wall was not only attached to his property in an structurally unsafe manner, but also existed only to block Campus's view. Though the DOB fined Rupp, the wall persisted for several more years. The court ruled in favor of Rupp in April 2007, but Rupp died shortly afterward, just as Campus was appealing the decision. The Rupp estate placed number 21 for sale and filed plans in June 2008 to disassemble the wall adjoining number 23, which the DOB approved that October. The wall between number 21 and number 23 was subsequently disassembled in 2009.

The LPC voted to designate the building at 23 Beekman Place as a city landmark on November 16, 2010. The LPC's decision to designate the house as a landmark was largely influenced by Rudolph's additions to the structure. The house was placed for sale at $27.5 million in 2012. At the time, all four units were occupied, but their leases were scheduled to expire the next year. The following year, the asking price was decreased to $22.5 million, even as a lease was signed for the penthouse unit. The three other units were occupied at that time. The building was again placed for sale in April 2017 for $19.5 million, and its penthouse became available for lease that August for $14,500 a month. The owner advertised the house for sale yet again in 2019 for $18.5 million. During the early 2020s, the penthouse was occupied by interior designers Christine and John Gachot, who renovated the space. The building had still not been sold as of 2023.

== Reception and media ==
Architectural reception of the house was mixed. With the completion of Rudolph's first renovation, Barbara Plumb wrote that the "one-bedroom apartment may be small, but its influence is likely to be huge" because of Rudolph's residence there. By 1975, architectural writer Robert A. M. Stern said Rudolph's apartment had become "a remarkable composition of floating townhouses and mirrored units". The architectural critic Paul Goldberger, writing for The New York Times in 1979, described the house as indicative of "both Mr. Rudolph's strengths and weaknesses", praising the aesthetic arrangement but writing that it conflicted with the design of the surrounding buildings. In the same newspaper in 1997, Joseph Giovannini called the house "the best thing that could have happened to the rather pickled enclave". Sorkin, writing for House & Garden in 1989, called it "easily one of the most amazing pieces of modern urban domestic architecture" created in the United States.

When the penthouse was completed, many of Rudolph's neighbors disapproved of the additions. One neighbor compared the penthouse to "assault as in rape", and others worried that their views of the East River would be blocked. Of the neighbors' complaints, Goldberger wrote that Beekman Place's buildings were designed in a variety of styles, which he said the neighbors had not kept in mind. Nuvo magazine wrote in 2023 that "the penthouse is a provocative piece of work" because of its unconventional design elements, including glass floors. In 2024, Curbed described the interiors as "a work of art as much as an apartment: There are endless stairways and almost no walls". Architecture critic Justin Davidson wrote for the same website that the film The Royal Tenenbaums—which depicted 23 Beekman Place as the residence of Ben Stiller's character—showed the building's "spatial excesses" when Stiller's character tried to stage a fire drill in the house.

== See also ==
- List of New York City Designated Landmarks in Manhattan from 14th to 59th Streets
