= Allan Beekman =

American journalist

Allan Beekman (January 16, 1913 – October 29, 2001) was an American reporter and author who wrote The Niihau Incident, Crisis: The Japanese Attack on Pearl Harbor and Southeast Asia and Hawaiian Tales.

== Life ==
Born in Utica, New York, Beekman moved to Hawaii as a young man in the early 1930s and lived there the remainder of his life. Severe deafness, which began at the age of 16, and the Great Depression kept him from going to college as a young man. He became fluent in the Japanese language, enabling him to write about the Japanese experience from Japanese language sources not available in English. He also became a scholar in Japanese immigrant history.

He was a reporter for the Honolulu Star-Bulletin and later wrote features and a weekly book review for more than 20 years at Pacific Citizen, a weekly newspaper directed to Americans of Japanese descent. Beekman championed the rights of Japanese Americans with articles and letters to the editor of Honolulu dailies, along with local political commentaries.

During the 1960s and 1970s, Beekman also worked as a security guard at Queen's Medical Center.

Beekman married Take Okawa, a former Japanese-language schoolteacher educated in Tokyo and Hawaii, who collaborated with her husband on several Japanese immigrant stories.

He died in Honolulu, Hawaii on October 29, 2001.

== Works ==
Several of the stories in Hawaiian Tales, published in 1972, dealt with pre-, post-, and wartime experiences of Japanese immigrants.

The Niihau Incident was a nonfiction account of the crash-landing of a Japanese Zero fighter plane on the Hawaiian island of Niihau immediately following the attack on Pearl Harbor on December 7, 1941. Beekman was the first to uncover some important details, until then unavailable in English, of the story of the Japanese fighter pilot, Shigenori Nishikaichi. Nishikaichi, unable to return to his carrier after the attack, crashed on the American island of Niihau and terrorized its residents for seven days. During this time the U.S. government was completely unaware of his presence there. After many years of original and in-depth research, Beekman grew to be the world authority on this incident.

== Bibliography ==
- Beekman, Allan (1970). Hawaiian tales. Detroit, MI, USA: Harlo Press. ASIN B0006COLQQ. OCLC 126553.
- Beekman, Allan (1982). The Niihau incident. Honolulu, HI, USA: Heritage Press of Pacific. ISBN 9780960913206. OCLC 9101878. "The true story of the Japanese fighter pilot who, after the Pearl Harbor attack, crash-landed on the Hawaiian Island of Niihau and terrorized the residents"
- Beekman, Allan (1989). The strange case of Katsu Gotō. Honolulu, HI, USA: Heritage Press of Pacific. OCLC 21490906.
- Beekman, Allan (1992). Crisis : the Japanese attack on Pearl Harbor and Southeast Asia. Honolulu, HI, USA: Heritage Press of Pacific. ISBN 9780960913237. OCLC 624436099, 26590386. (subscription required)
