= Anton Albert Beekman =

Anton Beekman
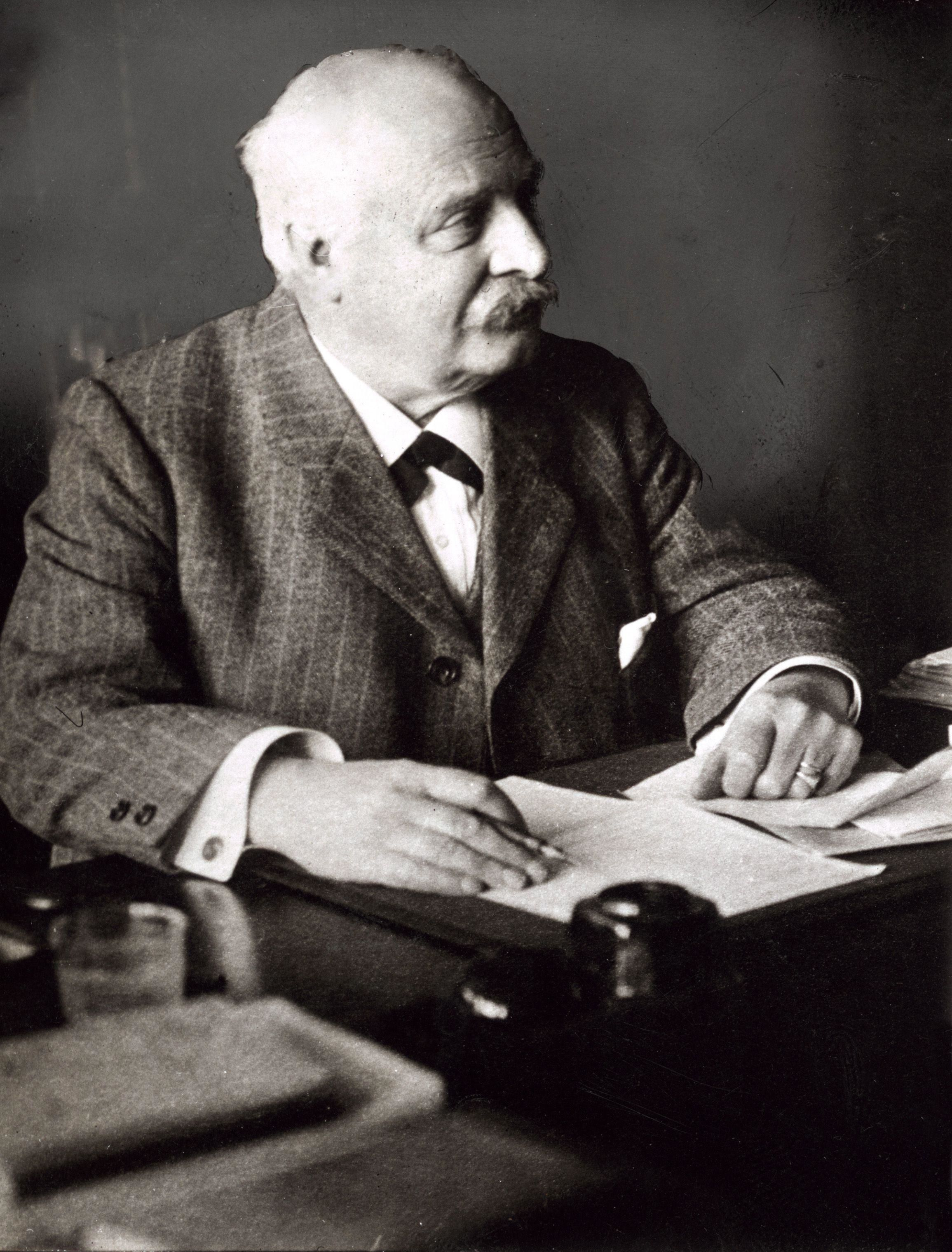
- Born: 5 January 1854; Amsterdam, Netherlands
- Died: 23 May 1947 (aged 93); The Hague, Netherlands

Anton Albert Beekman (5 January 1854 – 23 May 1947) was a Dutch geographer who focussed mainly on Dutch geography and other European countries. He is seen as one of the original founders of modern geography.

== Early life ==
Beekman was born on January 5, 1854, to Albert Griffith Beekman and Aartje Brouerius van Nideck in Amsterdam. He was educated a multiple schools during his youth in Amsterdam and Wageningen. He then attended Koninklijke Militaire Academie in Breda. He was involved in the strengthening of the Dutch-Utrecht polderland through fortifications and possible underwater installations. He specialized in under water engineering and geography during his service. At the age of 25 he left the service and became a mathematics teacher.

== Career ==
During his time as a math teacher he began traveling around the Netherlands and Europe. He published his findings in about 250 articles and books. He, together with Roelof Schuiling, was the publisher of the entire Earth's School Atlas. Most of his works are considered to be the beginning of modern geography. His works are still being used to educate Dutch youth in schools across the country.

== Publications ==
- The struggle for existence: history and present state of the low lands of the Netherlands, for non-technicians (1887).
- School Atlas of the Whole Earth (1889; 3rd, 1903; 8th, 1927).
- Plan of closure and drying of the Zuiderzee (1890).
- Polders and dryers 1st book: Description of the Dutch polderland; 2nd book: Technical design of polders (1909)
- The Netherlands as a polderland: Description of the peculiar state of the main half of our country, including the topography of that section with the main details, illustrated by maps and drawings (1884; 3rd, 1932)
- The dike and water law in the Netherlands before 1795 (1905-1907)
- Theatrical atlas of the Netherlands; the provinces of the north and south of the Netherlands in 1300 (1929)
- Part 11 of the Middle Dutch Dictionary (E. Verwijs and J. Verdam): Additions and improvements in dike and water law, soil and water, geography, etc. (1941)
- The waters of the Netherlands geographically and historically described (1948)
