= Luxembourg House =

Historic mansion in Manhattan, New York

Coordinates: 40°45′11.4″N 73°57′52.8″W

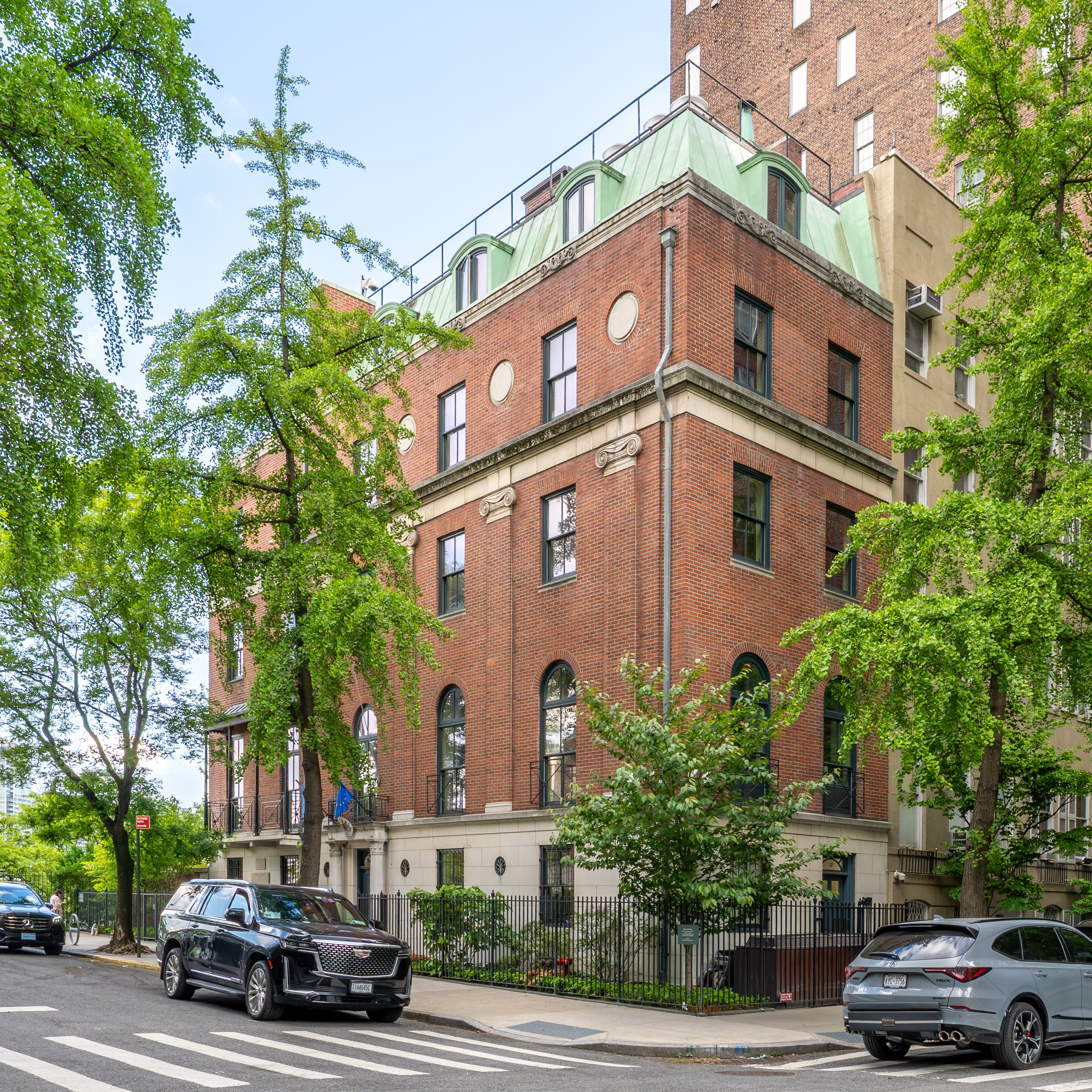
Luxembourg House in 2026

Luxembourg House is a historic mansion located at 17 Beekman Place, Midtown Manhattan, New York City, owned by the Grand Duchy of Luxembourg. It is home to the Permanent Mission of Luxembourg to the United Nations, the Consulate General of Luxembourg in New York, the Luxembourg Trade and Investment Office and the activities of the Luxembourg-American Chamber of Commerce. It hosts a number of international relations, international trade and cultural activities for the European country of Luxembourg. The property is territory of the country of Luxembourg providing it all diplomatic rights and privileges.

== History ==
The building is located on Beekman Place at the corner of East 50th Street in Midtown Manhattan. It was built in 1932 alongside mansions of the Vanderbilt family and J.P. Morgan family. It was designed by architect Harold Sterner for the former Secretary of Defense James Forrestal and was then later owned by the American composer Irving Berlin and his wife Ellin Mackay, an heiress. In 1990, it was purchased by The Grand Duchy of Luxembourg, which did a renovation that lasted three years.

In 2010, a book on the home was published and titled The Luxembourg House on Beekman Place: Three Portraits in Time.

== Architecture ==
The mansion is open on three sides, with the east side facing the East River. The exterior consists of a bottom floor white marble base, supported by three stories of red brick and a copper-sheathed mansard roof. Its entrance is flanked by two Corinthian columns and surrounded by a stone frame displaying the Grand Duchy of Luxembourg Coat of Arms. Shallow brick pilasters, two stories tall are at the second and third floors. The interior retains its original central circular staircase and its original moldings.
