= Beeckman =

Beeckman is a surname of Dutch origin.

Those bearing it include:

- Isaac Beeckman (1588–1637), Dutch philosopher and scientist
- Andries Beeckman (fl. 17th century), Dutch painter
- Robert Livingston Beeckman (1866–1935), American politician, governor of Rhode Island 1915–21
- Théophile Beeckman (1896–1955), Belgian professional road bicycle racer
- Koen Beeckman (born 1973), Belgian bicycle road racer
