= Peter Detmold Park =

Public park in Manhattan, New York

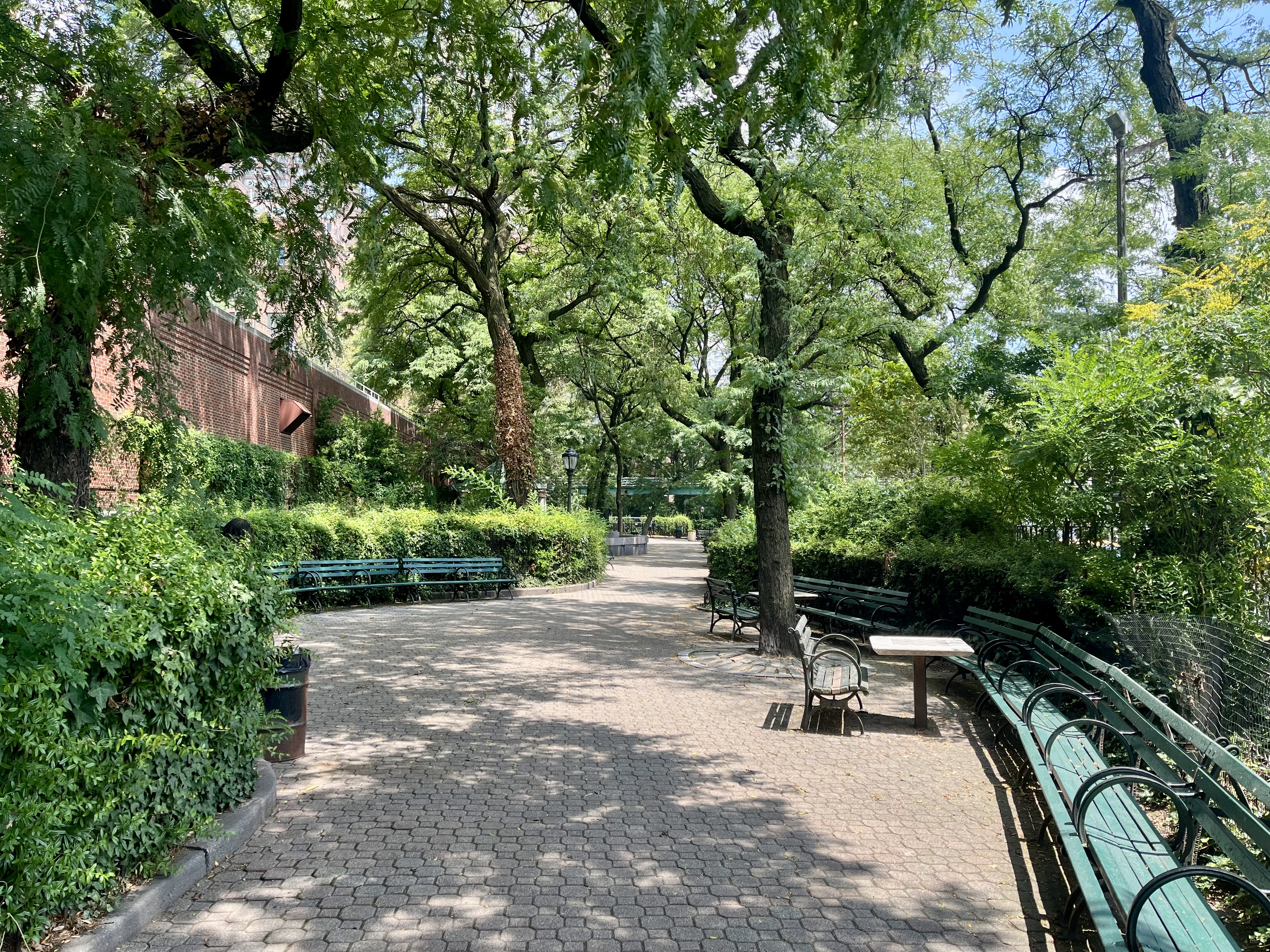
- Peter Detmold Park in 2023
- Interactive map of Peter Detmold Park
- Type: Urban park
- Location: Turtle Bay, Manhattan, New York, US
- Coordinates: 40°45′11″N 73°57′51″W
- Area: 0.59 acres (0.24 ha)
- Operator: New York City Department of Parks and Recreation

Peter Detmold Park is a 0.59-acre (0.24 ha) public park in the Turtle Bay neighborhood of Manhattan, New York, United States. Located on a narrow strip of land on the west side of the FDR Drive, the park runs from East 49th to 51st streets and was originally developed as a result of the construction of the adjacent highway in the early 1940s. The park was named after Peter Detmold in 1972 and can be accessed from a staircase leading down from the east end of East 51st Street or a street-level entrance on East 49th Street across from MacArthur Playground.

== History ==
=== Establishment of park ===
The origins of the park trace back to the construction of the East River Drive in the late 1930s and early 1940s. The stretch of parkland running from East 49th to 51st streets was one of the small parks created as part of the construction of the highway running along the East River, which resulted in the creation of more than 10 acres (4.0 ha) of space set aside for recreational activities. The property for what would become Peter Detmold Park was acquired in three parts between 1942 and 1951.

When the last strip of land for the park was added in 1951, the city moved forward with plans to construct a pedestrian footbridge from the east end of East 51st Street, running across the park and FDR Drive, to connect with a narrow public esplanade along the East River. During the design of the East River Drive, overpasses had been planned at various points to allow pedestrians to access the esplanades between the highway and the river. The planned public footbridge at East 51st Street was intended to replace two private footbridges that were located at the east end of East 52nd Street, next to the River House and The Campanile.

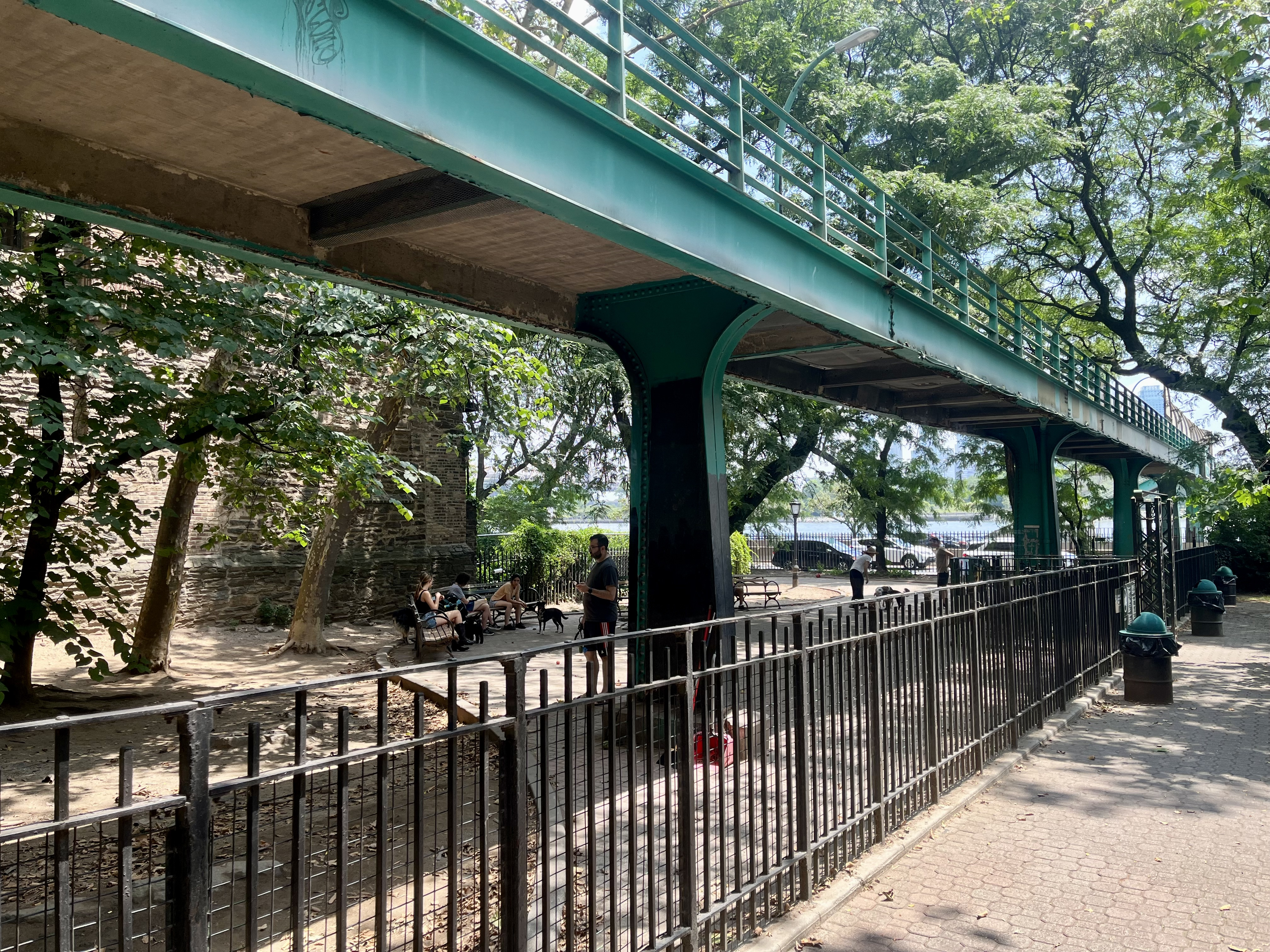
A pedestrian footbridge was added in 1952 and now spans the dog run at the north end of the park

Local residents protested the proposed location of the pedestrian footbridge, saying that it would encroach upon the park. A petition with over 2,500 signatures was sent to Mayor Vincent R. Impellitteri asking for playground equipment to be installed in the park in lieu of the pedestrian overpass. Some residents wanted the location of the overpass shifted further north to East 54th Street. However, the city moved forward with constructing the pedestrian overpass across the park at East 51st Street, which was completed in 1952.

=== Naming ===
In 1972, the park was named after Peter Detmold as a result of legislation introduced by city councilmember Carol Greitzer. The naming was approved by the New York City Council and signed into law by Mayor John Lindsay on July 20, 1972. Naming of the previously unnamed park after Peter Detmold had been suggested by the Turtle Bay Association and Community Board 6 after the death of the local resident and civic leader that had advocated for the preservation of the Turtle Bay neighborhood. On the night of January 6, 1972, the 48-year-old Detmold was found unconscious and had been stabbed in the chest on a staircase leading up to his apartment in a brownstone on East 48th Street. He was taken to Bellevue Hospital and pronounced dead. At the time, Detmold was serving as president of the Turtle Bay Association and vice chairman of Community Board 6. The crime was never solved.

=== Renovations ===
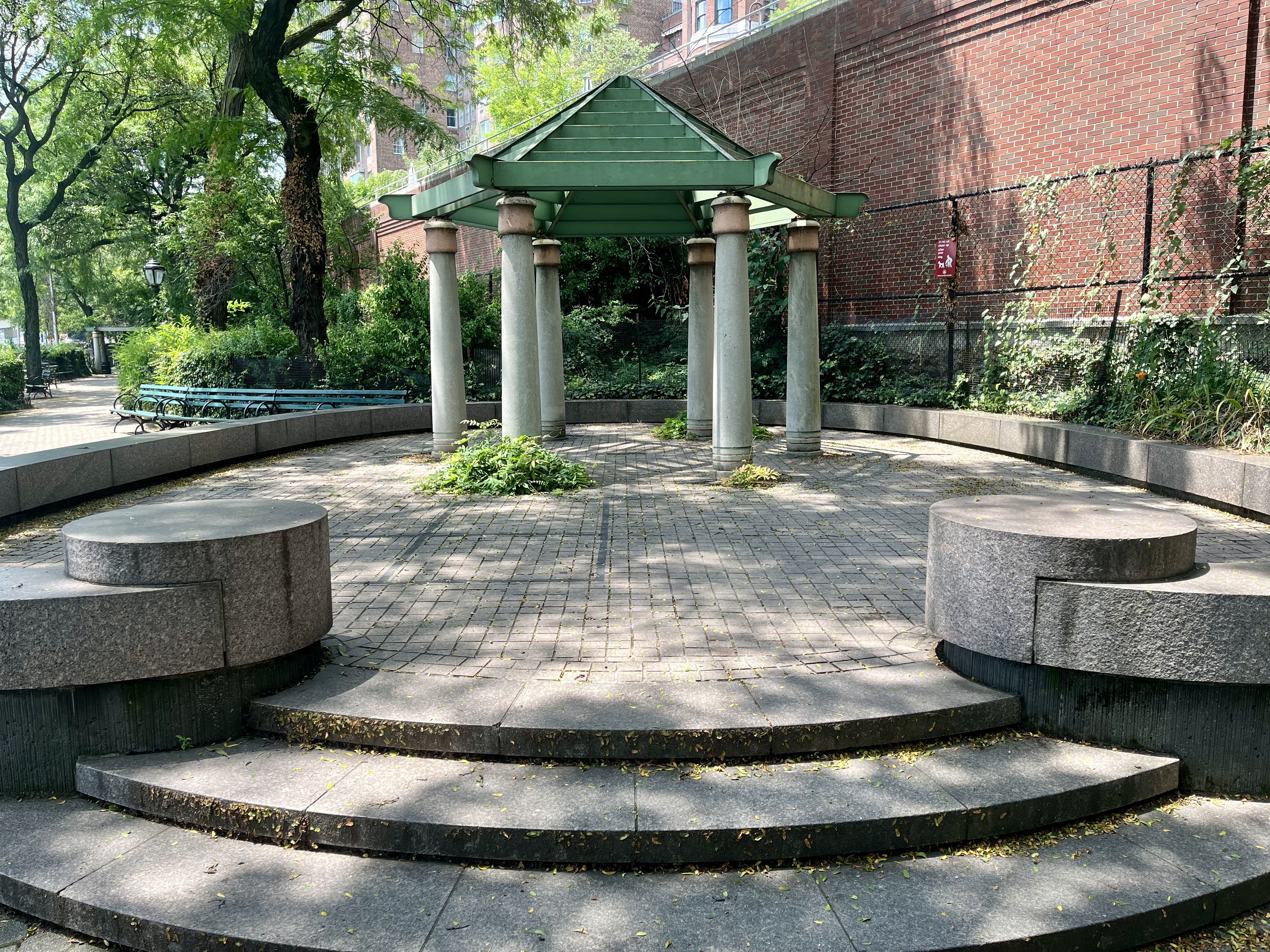
The gazebo inside a granite pavilion was dedicated to James Amster in 1987

Before his death, Detmold and other community members had been calling for improvements to the park but New York City's fiscal crisis and a lack of municipal funds during the 1970s prevented any significant upgrades. One of the local civic leaders who kept pushing for improvements was James Amster. On October 21, 1986, a groundbreaking ceremony was held to mark the start of a $794,000 project to renovate the park, which was attended by elected officials, community residents, and the twin daughters of Peter Detmold. Improvements included the installation of new benches, lighting, pavement, trees and shrubs, and underground utilities. A landscaped berm was also created to serve as a noise and visual barrier from traffic on the FDR Drive. Other additions made to the park included a gazebo situated within a centrally located granite pavilion and a pergola near the southern entrance to the park. The restoration was completed the following year and a grand opening was held on October 2, 1987, that included Parks Commissioner Henry Stern dedicating the gazebo to James Amster. Amster had died in June 1986 at the age of 77, just a few months before the start of the renovation project.

A dog run was added to the park in 1995. Located at the north end of the park in the area below the pedestrian footbridge, it became one of the park's biggest attractions. In fact, the dog run became so popular with dog walkers that park users urged the Parks Department to enforce a limit of bringing four dogs per person to reduce overcrowding, dogfights and noise from barking.

The sidewalks and fencing at the park were later reconstructed with $100,000 of funding from councilmember A. Gifford Miller in 1999.
