= 51st Street (Manhattan) =

West-east street in Manhattan, New York

51st
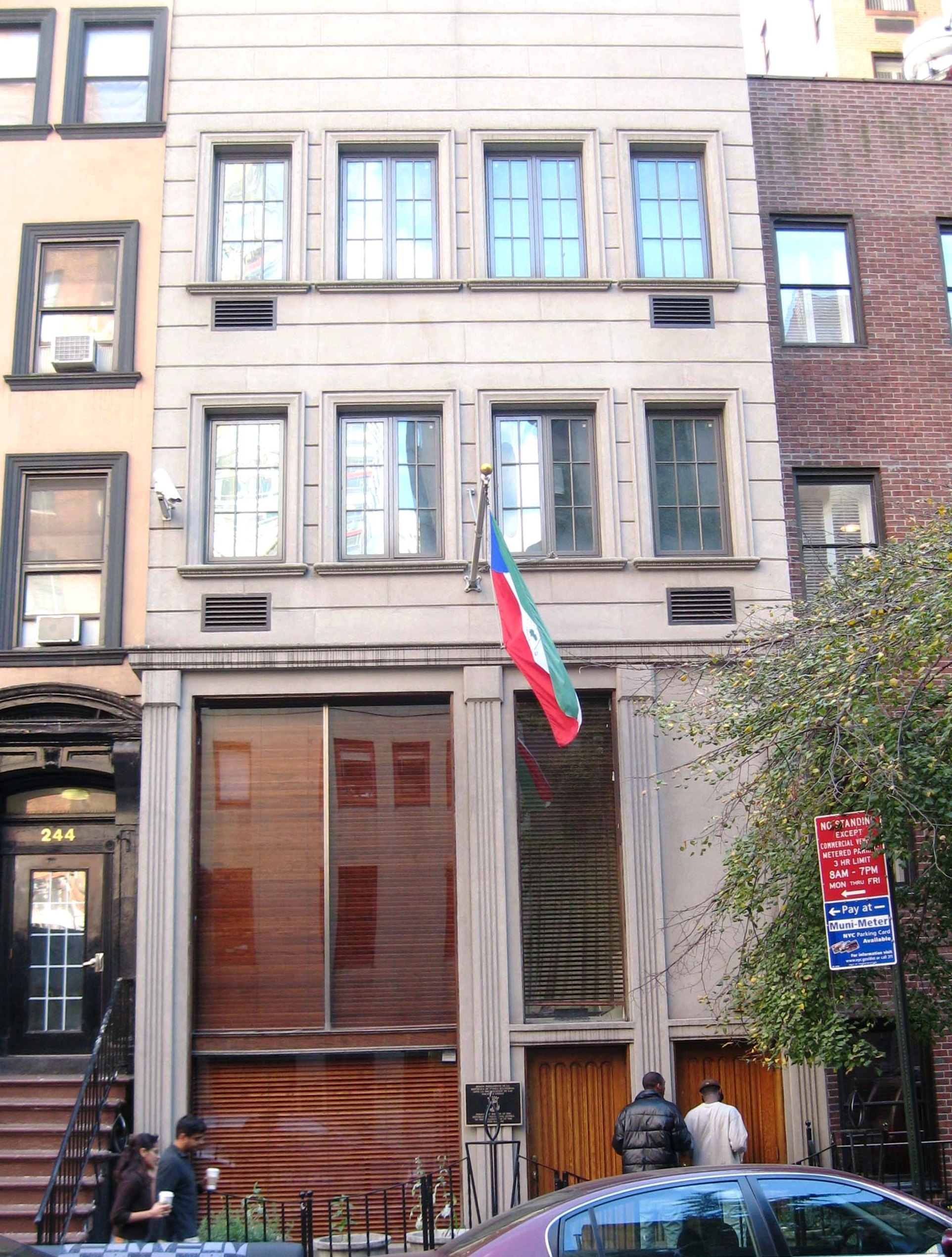
- Permanent Mission of Equatorial Guinea, located on 51st Street west of 2nd Avenue
- Maintained by: NYCDOT
- Length: 1.926 mi (3.100 km)
- Location: Manhattan, New York City
- Coordinates: 40°45′38″N 73°58′48″W
- West end: NY 9A (12th Avenue) in Hell's Kitchen
- East end: Beekman Place in Midtown East
- North: 52nd Street
- South: 50th Street

Construction
- Commissioned: March 1811

51st Street is a 1.9-mile (3.1 km) long one-way street traveling east to west across Midtown Manhattan.

== Notable places, east to west ==
The route officially begins at Beekman Place which is on a hill overlooking FDR Drive. 51st continues for a few feet east of the intersection but the street sign refers to it as Peter Detmold Park (a reference to the dog park at the bottom of the hill) which has a pedestrian footbridge over the FDR to an esplanade along the East River.

=== Beekman Place ===
- Yemen Mission to the United Nations

=== First Avenue ===
- 351 East 51st Street - An apartment complex on one of several sites where Nathan Hale is believed to have been hanged, after the Battle of Long Island
- Laos Mission to the United Nations

=== Second Avenue ===
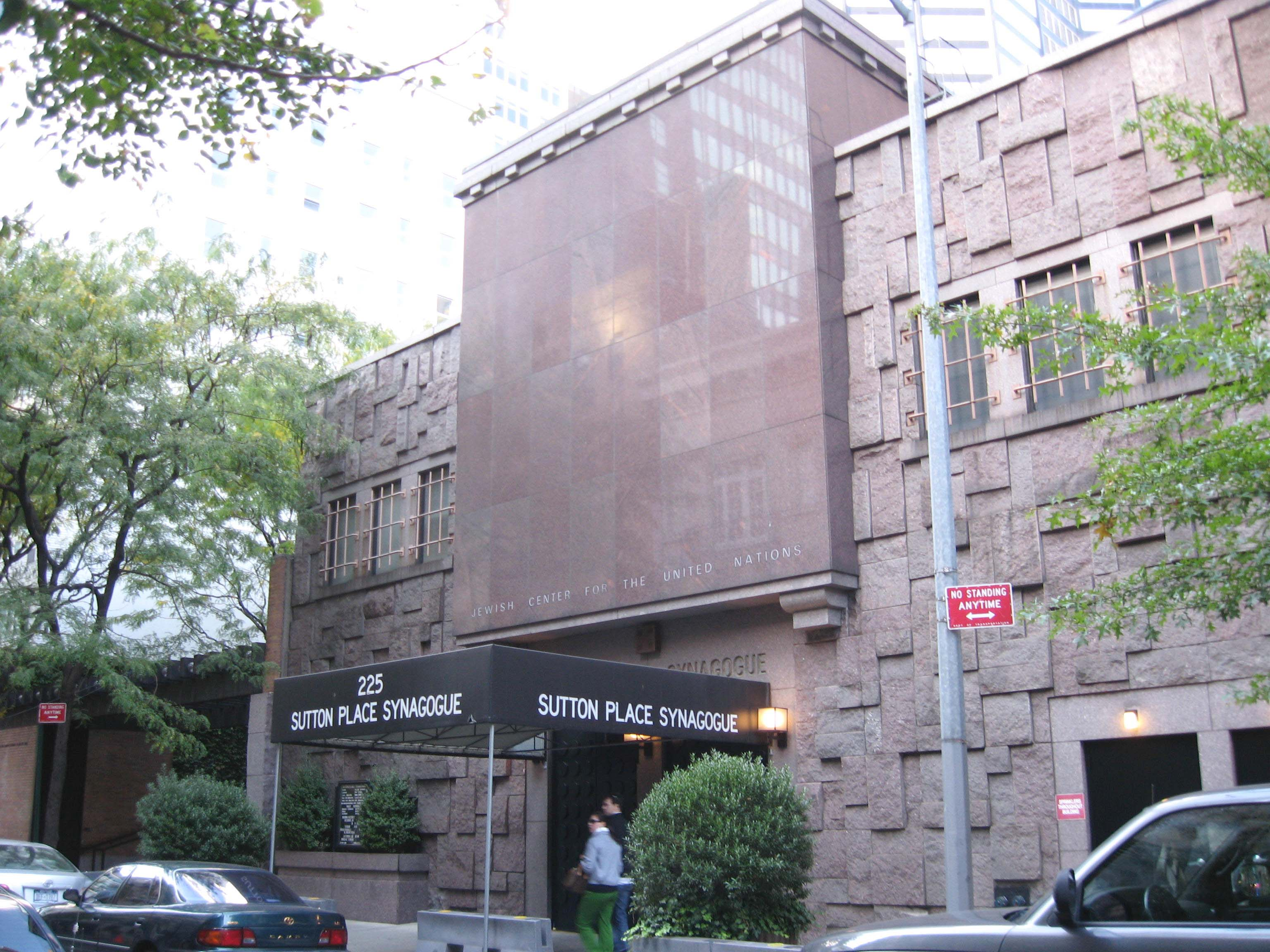
Sutton Place Synagogue (Jewish Center for the United Nations)

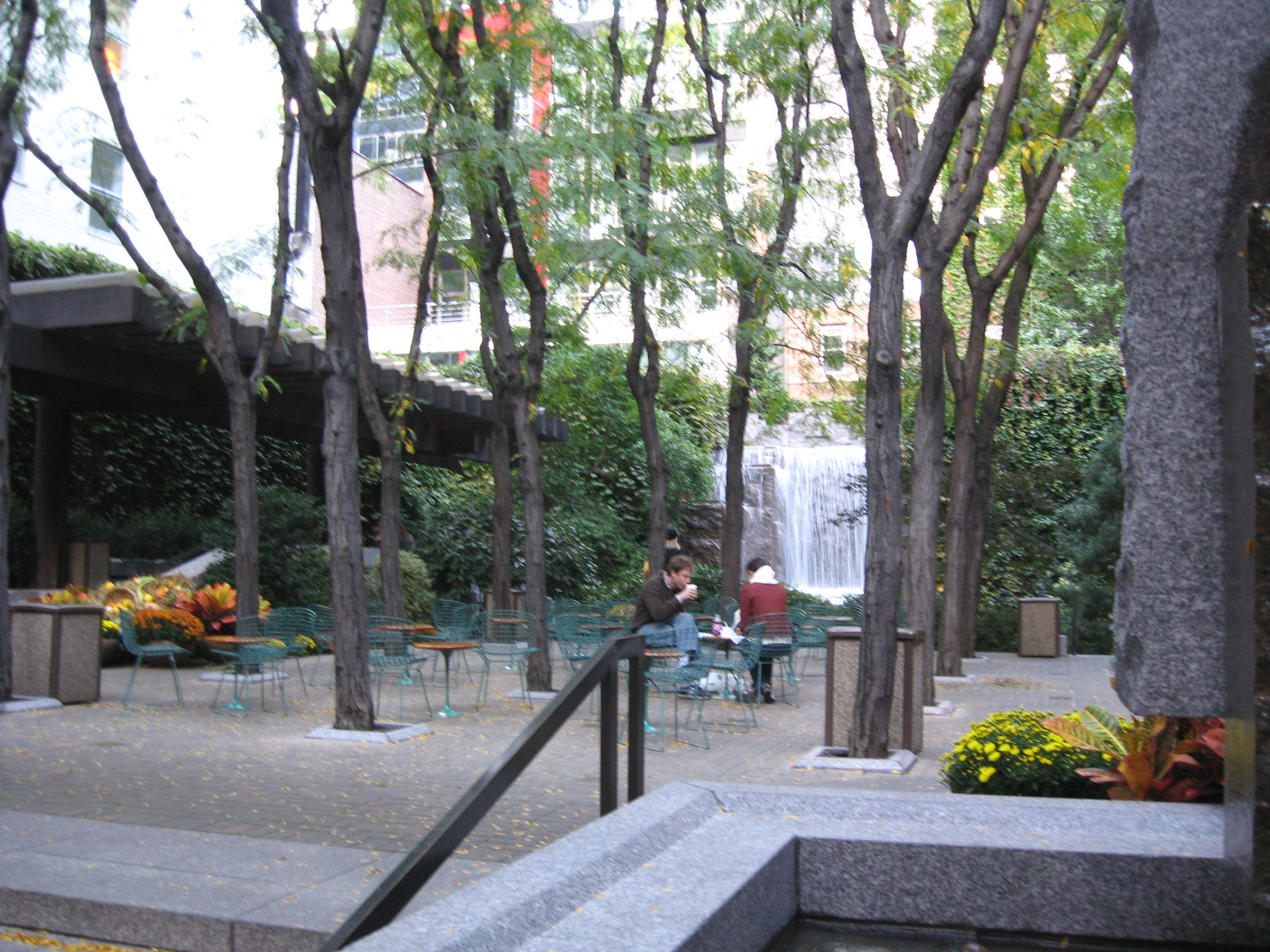
Greenacre Park

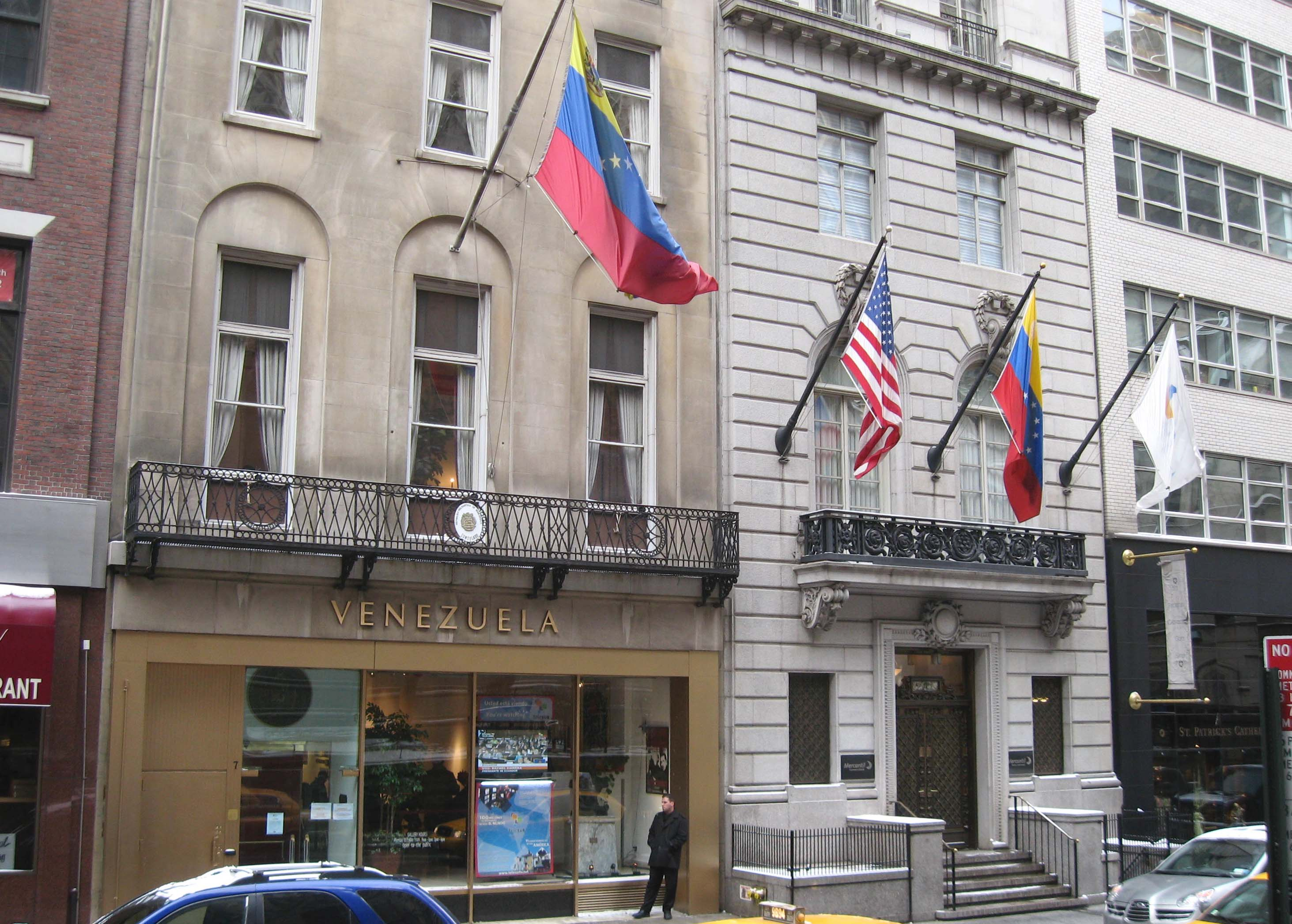
Venezuela consulate (left) and John Peirce Residence (right)

- Tonga Mission to the United Nations
- Equatorial Guinea Mission to the United Nations
- POD Hotel
- Greenacre Park
- Sutton Place Synagogue

=== Third Avenue ===
- 17th Precinct of NYPD
- Engine Company No 8, Ladder 2, 8th Battalion of FDNY
- DoubleTree by Hilton Hotel Metropolitan New York City
- Consulate of the United Kingdom

=== Lexington Avenue ===
- General Electric Building
- St. Bartholomew's Episcopal Church
- 345 Park Avenue

=== Park Avenue ===
- 350 Park Avenue
- 320 Park Avenue
- Villard Houses and The New York Palace Hotel

=== Madison Avenue ===
- St. Patrick's Cathedral
- 488 Madison Avenue (Look Building)
- John Peirce Residence
- Venezuela Consulate
- Olympic Tower

=== Fifth Avenue ===
- Rockefeller Center
- Radio City Music Hall
- 1290 Avenue of the Americas

=== Sixth Avenue ===
- Time-Life Building
- SportsNet New York Studios
- 1285 Avenue of the Americas
- 787 Seventh Avenue
- Millennium Plaza (former Taft Hotel)

=== Sixth and a Half Avenue ===
- In the middle of block between Sixth and Seventh Avenues is a pedestrian corridor named by the city "Sixth and a Half Avenue", which runs from 51st to 57th Streets.

=== Seventh Avenue ===
- Sheraton Manhattan

=== Broadway ===
- Novotel Manhattan
- Paramount Plaza
- Mark Hellinger Theatre
- Times Square Church
- George Gershwin Theatre

=== Eighth Avenue ===
- St. Paul's House - Church founded by J.J.D. Hall that is noted for its "Sin Will Find You Out" neon sign in the shape of a cross that was featured on Saturday Night Live

=== Ninth Avenue ===
- Closed Midtown Branch of Saint Vincent's Catholic Medical Center (formerly St. Clares Hospital)

=== Eleventh Avenue ===
- Hustler Club

=== West Side Highway ===
The route concludes at the West Side Highway (New York Route 9A). Opposite the intersection is the New York Passenger Ship Terminal and the Hudson River.

== Transportation ==
The New York City Subway's 51st Street station is located on the intersection of 51st Street and Lexington Avenue and is served by the 4, 6, and <6> trains.

There is an entrance on the intersection of 51st Street and Eighth Avenue leading to the uptown platforms of the 50th Street station on the IND Eighth Avenue Line, which is served by the A, C, and E trains. Another entrance on the intersection leading to the downtown platforms of the station existed until 1992, when it was closed.
