= The Campanile (New York City) =

Apartment building in Manhattan, New York

- The Campanile photographed in November 2026. The taller, 1930s River House is visible to the right.
- Alternative names: The Beeckman Campanile

General information
- Type: Housing cooperative
- Architectural style: Gothic revival, Italianate
- Location: 450 East 52nd Street, New York, NY, US
- Coordinates: 40.754079°N 73.963286°W
- Construction started: 1926
- Completed: 1927

Height
- Top floor: 14

Design and construction
- Architecture firm: Van Wart & Wein

The Campanile is a co-op apartment building located at 450 East 52nd Street in Manhattan, New York City.

The building sits at the end of a cul-de-sac. Overlooking the East River, the building - as did its neighbor River House - used to have direct access to the river before the FDR Drive was built in 1940.

The Campanile was described in 1968 by the New York Times as “rear[ing] up out of the water like a palazzo on Venice's Grand Canal, although its style [being] pseudo-Norman.”

== History ==
The Campanile photographed in 1930. The former, pre-FDR Drive, access to the East River is visible.

Joseph B. Thomas, a developer and fox hunting aficionado, commissioned the building in 1926. Residents were allowed to decide where bathrooms and kitchens were situated, considered noteworthy in New York City when the New York Times wrote about the building in 1968. The building was designed to consist of eight duplex apartments.

The Mayfair Yacht Club, initially Montauk Yacht Club, was located at the bottom of the building until 1934.

== Notable residents ==
Entrance on East 52nd Street, photographed in 2012.

- Madeleine Astor, socialite, lived there in the 1930s.
- Benjamin Buttenwieser, banker, and Helen Lehman Buttenwieser, lawyer, living there in the 1960s.
- Montgomery Clift, actor.
- Noël Coward, playwright, composer and actor.
- Henry J. Heinz, entrepreneur, living there in the 1960s.
- Greta Garbo, actress, lived there from 1954 until her death in 1990.
- Henry Luce, magazine publisher, and Clare Boothe Luce, playwright.
- Ralph Pulitzer, newspaper publisher.
- Valentina Sanina (Schlee), fashion designer, living there in the 1960s.
- Sir William Stephenson, soldier and spymaster, living there in the 1960s.
- Saint Subber, theatrical producer.
- Alexander Woollcott, drama critic.
