= Allerton 39th Street House =

Hotel in Manhattan, New York

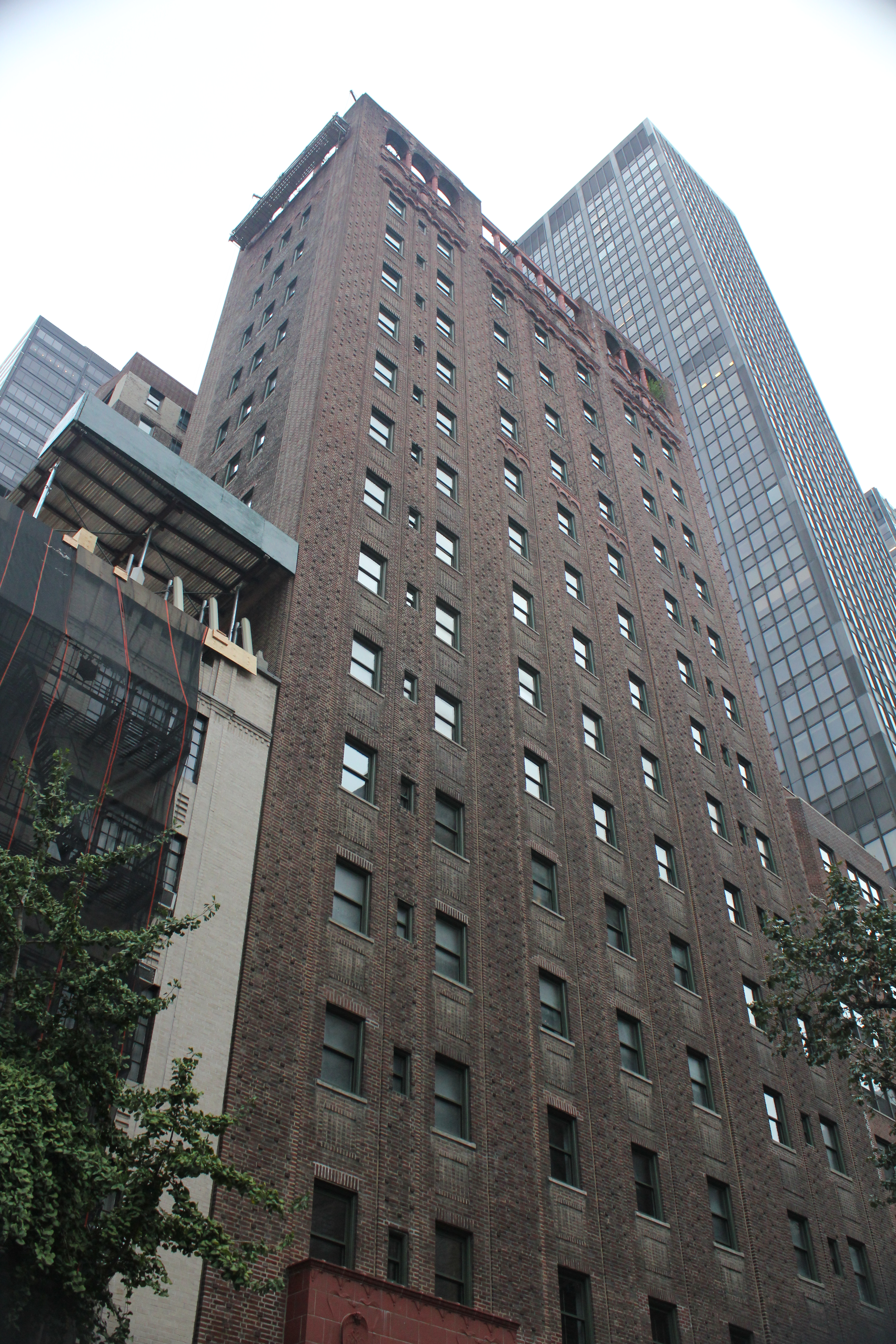
- (2021)
- Interactive map of the Allerton 39th Street House area

General information
- Architectural style: Renaissance Revival architecture
- Location: 145 East 39th Street; New York, NY
- Coordinates: 40°44′58″N 73°58′36″W
- Year built: 1916–1918

Design and construction
- Architect: Arthur Loomis Harmon

New York City Landmark
- Designated: March 18, 2008
- Reference no.: 2296

The Allerton 39th Street House, now Pod 39, is a hotel at 145 East 39th Street between Lexington and Third avenues in the Murray Hill neighborhood of Manhattan in New York City. The building, completed in 1918 as a men-only club hotel, was designed for the Allerton Company by Arthur Loomis Harmon. It subsequently served as a single room occupancy residence for women run by the Salvation Army from 1956 to 2007. Since 2012, the building has operated as the Pod 39 hotel. The Allerton 39th Street House is a New York City designated landmark.

The building is variously cited as 15 or 17 stories high and is designed in the Northern Italian Renaissance style. To keep the cost of the building economical, Harmon decided to use inexpensive red brick for the façade with architectural terracotta decorations. Harmon designed the upper stories of the structure as an exposed tower visible from all directions, which was topped by a roof garden and penthouse. The public areas in the building were also designed in the Italian Renaissance style and originally consisted of a two-story lounge, a small lobby, and an office. The upper stories have included bedrooms ever since the building's opening. Over the years, both the public and private areas have been redesigned.

== Site ==
The Allerton 39th Street House is located at 145 East 39th Street, on the northern sidewalk between Lexington and Third avenues, in the Murray Hill neighborhood of Manhattan in New York City. The land lot has an area of 6,995 square feet (649.9 m^{2}), with a frontage of 70.83 feet (21.59 m) and a depth of 98.75 feet (30.10 m). Nearby buildings include the Jonathan W. Allen Stable on the same block to the northeast; the Socony-Mobil Building one block to the north; and the George S. Bowdoin Stable, 146 East 38th Street, and 152 East 38th Street one block south.

== History ==
=== Background ===
The Allerton 39th Street House was one of six "club hotels" developed by the Allerton Company in New York City during the period from 1913 to 1924. Aside from the Allerton Hotel for Women on East 57th Street, the company's chain of club hotels primarily catered to men. Allerton hotels were also opened in other cities, including the Allerton Hotel in Chicago and the Allerton Hotel in Cleveland. Co-founded by James Stewart Cushman and William Silk, the Allerton Company was named after Mary Allerton, a relative of Cushman who immigrated on the Mayflower to America and eventually settled in Greenwich Village.

The company's club hotels were a variation of apartment hotels that were popular among unmarried men and young families during the late 19th and early 20th centuries, but also included the types of social activities provided at private clubs and were aimed at providing affordable housing and social life to young middle-class men. The club hotels provided an alternative to rooming houses and boarding houses for single professionals seeking economical living accommodations and also provided opportunities for social interactions for individuals, especially those that came from small towns and often did not have family connections in the city.

=== Opening and early years ===
The Allerton House on East 39th Street was the third hotel in the Allerton chain to open in New York City, following locations at 302 West 22nd Street in Chelsea and at 311 Lexington Avenue in Murray Hill. Plans for the new hotel on East 39th Street were filed with the Manhattan Bureau of Buildings in July 1916. A classified advertisement posted in The New York Times in October 1918 announced that management was now ready to take applications for its new residence at 145 East 39th Street, which rented furnished rooms exclusively for bachelors starting at $6.50 (equivalent to $139 in 2025) per week. At the time, the Allerton House was a men-only hotel.

There were 400 rooms in the hotel, many of which shared a bathroom in between rooms. While each room contained a lavatory, the smaller rooms shared showers and toilets that were located down the hallway in convenient groups. The building's amenities for residents included dining rooms, a library, reading rooms, a lounge, billiard room, a reception room, a gymnasium, a swimming pool, and a roof garden with an adjoining solarium.

American writer F. Scott Fitzgerald rented a room at the Allerton House in February 1920, where he wrote the short stories "The Jelly-Bean" and "May Day". In 1934, the architect William F. Regan filed plans for $6,000 worth of alterations to the building.

=== Salvation Army residence ===
After the death of Florence Ten Eyck Troughton in 1948, the Salvation Army received a gift of $1.5 million from her will. She had left her entire estate to the charity with the stipulation that it be used as a residence for working women. With funds from Troughton's gift, the Salvation Army purchased the Allerton Hotel in 1954, renovated the structure, and converted it into the Ten Eyck-Troughton Memorial Residence. The renovated building was dedicated on February 7, 1956, and became the home to 350 middle-aged, middle-income women. Mrs. Frederick Elliott of the Salvation Army said she sought to attract those "to whom we thought we could render service and those who like group living". Within two years, there was a waiting list for the rooms, which cost $17 to $22 a week based on their size.

Each room was furnished and included a telephone. The residence had communal bathrooms, except for a few suites that had private baths and were used by visiting evangelists. Residents were provided with breakfast and dinner on weekdays and three meals a day on Sundays and holidays. Amenities for residents of the building included conference rooms, a guests' kitchenette with an adjoining clubroom, a hobby room, a library, lounges, two music studios, a television room, a roof garden, a sewing room, a solarium, and a typewriter room. The Allerton House's bar was replaced with a rose-and-green reception room.

The facility continued to be operated by the Salvation Army until 2007. At that time the Salvation Army indicated it would be selling the Ten Eyck-Troughton Memorial Residence along with a similar women-only single room occupancy building it ran in Gramercy Park, the Parkside Evangeline, because they had become too costly for the charity to maintain. A group of evicted tenants filed suit against the Salvation Army in early 2007, but the court ruled that the buildings were operated for charitable purposes and were exempt from the city's rent stabilization laws. The building was designated as a New York City landmark by the New York City Landmarks Preservation Commission in 2008.

=== Pod 39 hotel ===
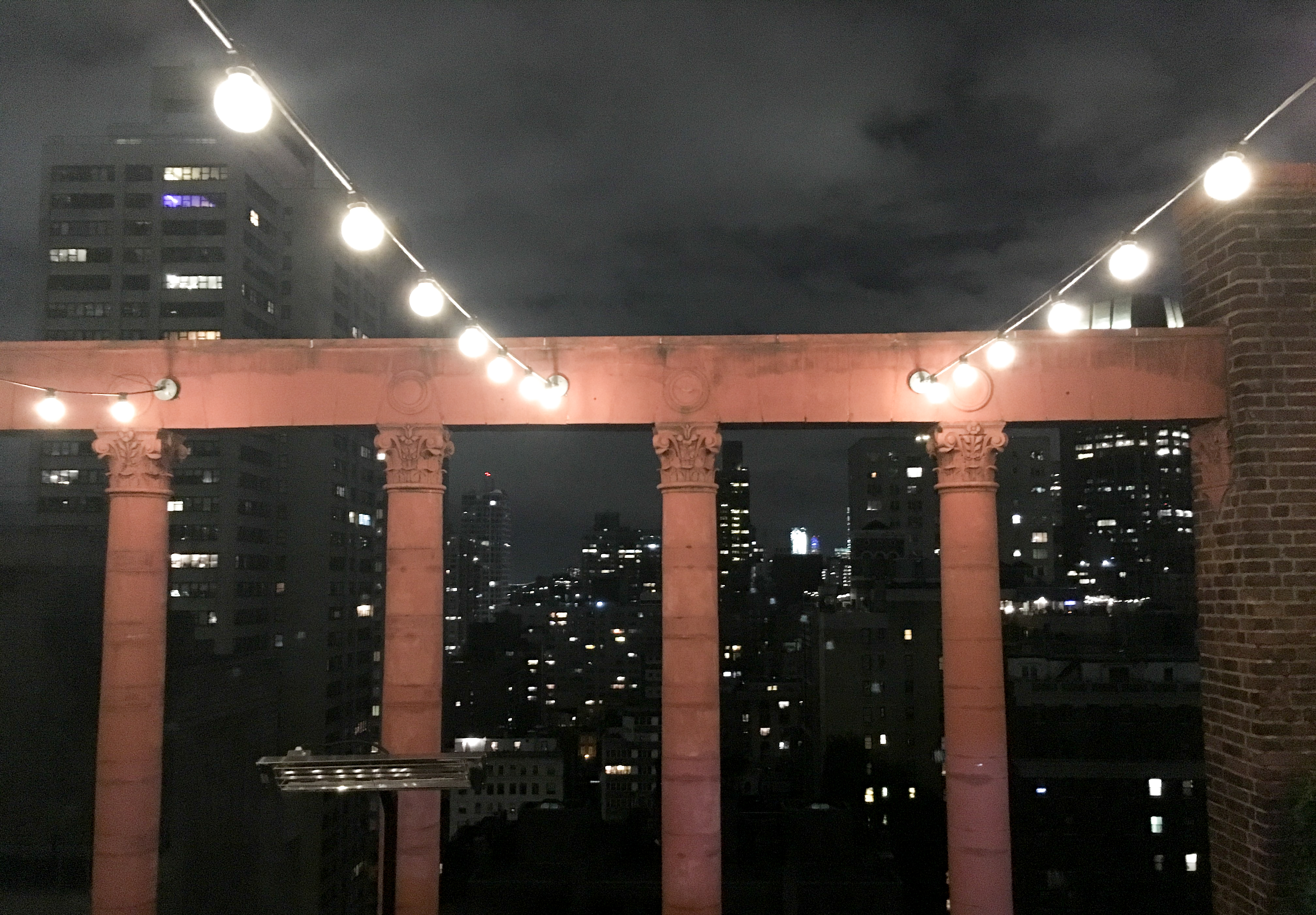
View of the city from Pod 39's rooftop bar and lounge

BD Hotels purchased the property from the Salvation Army for $28 million in 2010. The group renovated the building into a 367-room hotel called Pod 39, which opened in June 2012 and was based on a similar hotel, Pod 51. The rooms range from 55 to 140 square feet (5.1 to 13.0 m^{2}); due to the small size of the rooms, they include features such as storage below the beds and power outlets next to the pillows. The rooms were designed to cater to value-oriented travelers, and some contain bunk beds. Approximately 4,500 square feet (420 m^{2}) of common areas are located in the hotel where guests can spend time outside of their rooms.

A bar and lounge on the hotel's rooftop, in the space formerly occupied by the roof garden and solarium, opened in August 2012. The restaurant in the lobby was originally owned by April Bloomfield and Ken Friedman and named Salvation Taco as a nod to the former use of the building. Salvation Taco was replaced by Empellón Al Pastor in 2019. A bar operated by Freehold Hospitality opened on the 17th-floor roof in May 2023.

== Architecture ==
The building was designed by Arthur Loomis Harmon. He had designed the other four hotels in the Allerton chain and later went on to design the Shelton Hotel on Lexington Avenue, which opened in 1923. The hotel has been cited as 15 stories or 17 stories high.

=== Exterior ===
To keep the cost of the building economical, Harmon decided to use inexpensive red brick for the façade, which led to his choice of using details in the Northern Italian Renaissance style. He desired varied brickwork with deep-raked and irregular joints to draw interest to the material, but had difficulty in communicating his design intent to the masons. The foreman reluctantly agreed to do so, but only with the understanding that his name would not be connected the job. In the February 1923 issue of Architecture, Harmon recounted he still had issues getting his desired effect, remarking "the brick are laid as irregularly as the deadly mechanical perfection of the modern mason will permit." The structure was the earliest example of a tall building in New York City designed in the Northern Italian Renaissance style.

Recognizing that the restrictions from the 1916 Zoning Resolution would affect the setbacks of future developments in the area, Harmon chose to make the upper stories of the structure an exposed tower that would be visible from all directions. Using an H-plan design with open light courts facing the adjacent buildings to the east and west, the building has a center core that rises two stories above the north and south wings and contains a hipped roof. Harmon chose to emphasize the building's vertical lines by employing recessed window bays and also used vertical lines of projecting headers in the brickwork on the street façade.

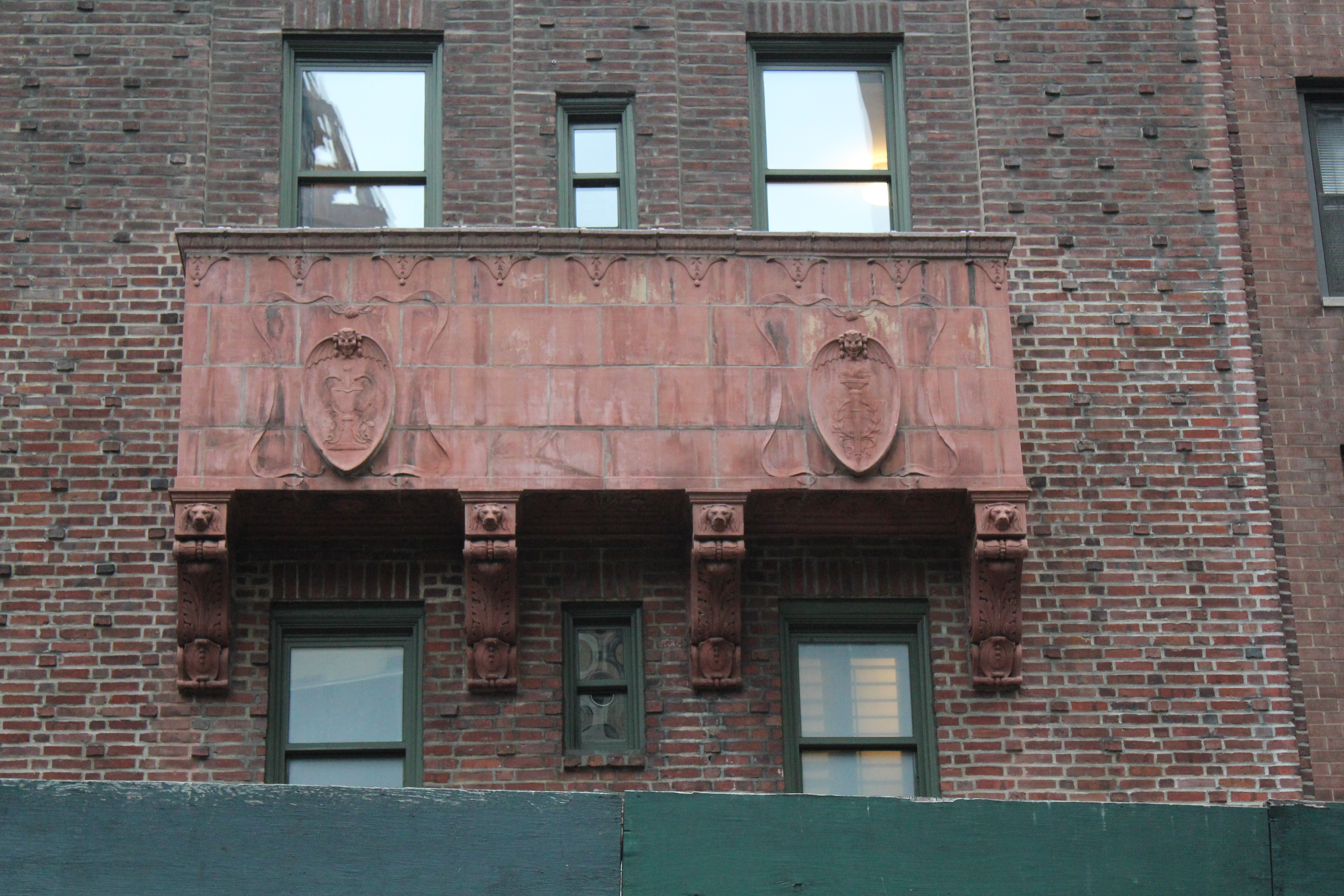
Terra cotta balconettes and cartouches

On the ground floor of the building, the façade has a raised granite base with stone-trimmed doorways and windows. The main entrance is topped by a lintel with molded denticulation; it is decorated with an eagle, wreath, and ribbons above the doorway, which serve as a tribute to the American entry into World War I. Arched windows and secondary doorways are located on either side of the main entrance, each of which has a molded lintel. The façade facing the street consists of three recessed window bays and is made of red brick highlighted by red terra cotta elements above the windows on the second floor that include cartouches, a blind arcade band on the center bay, and balconettes supported by decorative brackets on the outer bays. Other terra cotta elements include blind arcade bands and cartouches on some of the upper floors and a colonnade and arcade on the façade at the roof garden. The building's terra cotta elements were fabricated by the Atlantic Terra Cotta Company.

The roof garden on the south wing is accessed via a short flight of steps leading down from the solarium in the center core. An arcade and colonnade around the perimeter of the roof garden provide a partial enclosure to the space while allowing for views of the city. The south side of the roof garden has a five-bay colonnade at the center with three arched openings on either side while the north and south sides of the roof garden have three arched openings topped with a gable roof line. A central penthouse enclosed by walls on all four sides was used to house the water tanks and elevator machinery. As other buildings in the Allerton chain also hid their water towers, Cushman's obituary in The New York Times recognized Harmon as "a pioneer in improving the New York skyline."

=== Interior ===
The public areas on the interior of the building were also designed in the Italian Renaissance style. The building's interior was intended to be more like a private club instead of a hotel and featured a large two-story lounge on the ground floor and first floor mezzanine at the rear that occupied the full width of the building. The lounge had wood paneling on the walls and beams and paneling on the ceiling. A small lobby was located on the ground floor at the front of the building, and the office was tucked away behind the elevators. Since 2012, the public areas have served as communal areas for guests.

== See also ==
- List of hotels in New York City
- List of New York City Designated Landmarks in Manhattan from 14th to 59th Streets
