= Modulightor Building =

Commercial building in Manhattan, New York

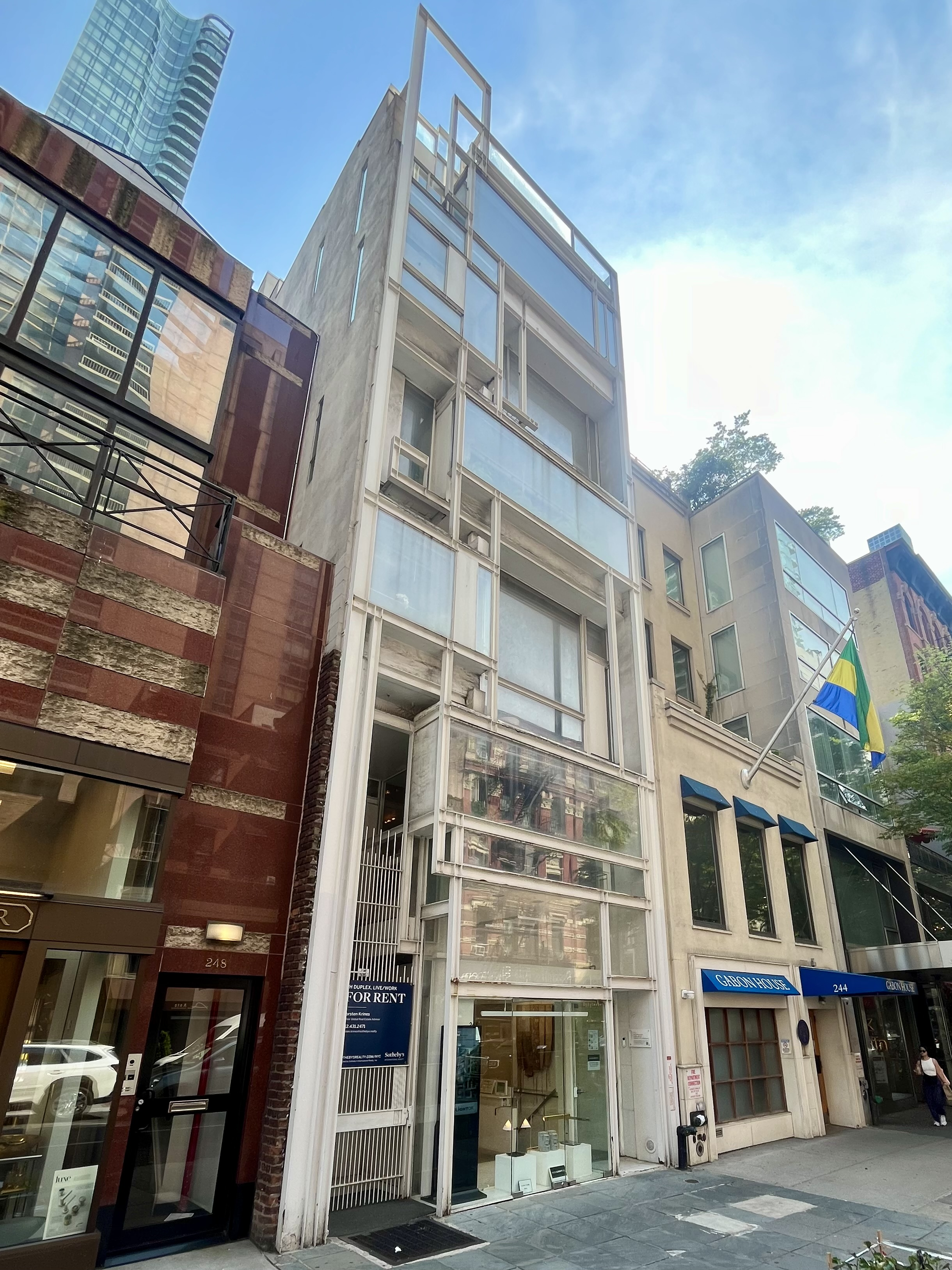
- The building in 2024, after its additions
- Interactive map of the Modulightor Building area

General information
- Architectural style: Modernist
- Location: 246 East 58th Street, Manhattan, New York, US
- Coordinates: 40°45′36″N 73°57′55″W
- Construction started: 1989
- Construction stopped: 1994
- Renovated: 2007–2016
- Owner: Paul Rudolph Institute for Modern Architecture

Design and construction
- Architect: Paul Rudolph

New York City Landmark
- Designated: December 19, 2023
- Reference no.: 2676
- Designated entity: Facade

New York City Landmark
- Designated: May 6, 2025
- Reference no.: 2684
- Designated entity: Duplex interior

The Modulightor Building is a commercial building in the Midtown East neighborhood of Manhattan, New York City, United States. The first four stories, designed by the architect Paul Rudolph and completed in 1993, were an overhaul of a 19th-century townhouse. The structure was one of the last designed by Rudolph in Manhattan before he died in 1997; unlike his other projects, the Modulightor Building was not particularly well-publicized, receiving little media coverage until the 2000s. The fifth and sixth stories, completed in 2016, were designed by Mark Squeo, an associate of Rudolph. The building's facade and the interior of the third- and fourth-story duplex (formerly occupied by Rudolph's partner Ernst Wagner) are designated as New York City landmarks.

The building was constructed for Modulightor, a company that Rudolph co-founded to sell light fixtures. The main elevation of the facade is to the north, while the rear elevation faces south; both elevations are composed of overlapping, interlocking rectangles made of white I-beams. There is a rooftop deck with gray tiles, in addition to protruding balconies in the rear. The building holds Modulightor's store in the basement and on the first floor, while the remaining spaces house the Paul Rudolph Institute for Modern Architecture. The third story of the Wagner duplex includes a kitchen and two living rooms, while the fourth story has four bedrooms and two bathrooms. The duplex's interconnected rooms are decorated in a white palette, with design details such as floating houseplants, cantilevered staircases, banisters, and bookshelves.

The building is named for the Modulightor lighting company, which Wagner and Rudolph had cofounded in 1976. Rudolph and Wagner acquired the building in February 1989 and Rudolph worked on it over the next four years. The third- and fourth-floor duplex unit originally comprised two apartments, which were rented in 1996 to MTV founder John Lack and his daughter. After the Lacks moved out in 1999, Wagner moved into the building in the early 2000s. The architect Donald Luckenbill subsequently combined the two duplex apartments; these were used by the Paul Rudolph Foundation. Squeo drew up plans for the fifth and sixth stories starting in 2007, and these stories were opened to the public in 2016. After the Paul Rudolph Foundation was evicted in 2014, the Paul Rudolph Heritage Foundation (later Institute for Modern Architecture) moved into the building, acquiring it in 2023.

== Site ==
The Modulightor Building is at 246 East 58th Street in the East Midtown neighborhood of Manhattan in New York City, United States. The rectangular land lot covers approximately 2,000 square feet (190 m^{2}), with a frontage of 20 feet (6.1 m) on 58th Street and a depth of 100 feet (30 m). Immediately outside the building is a sidewalk divided into square panels of gray slate, as well as a planting bed by the curb. The building is one block south of the Queensboro Bridge's Manhattan terminal and the Roosevelt Island Tramway plaza. Nearby buildings include 252 East 57th Street one block to the south and 311 and 313 East 58th Street to the east.

Paul Rudolph, the Modulightor Building's developer, had bought the building specifically because of the presence of several design showrooms in the area, which had been unofficially known as the Design District since at least the 1960s. The block had once contained many row houses, which had been developed starting in the mid-19th century and were commonplace along 58th Street and other west-east streets. These row houses had included an Italianate brownstone at 246 East 58th Street, which was three stories high and dated to the 1850s or 1860s. This rowhouse had been divided into 15 rooms by 1941 and was converted into a commercial building by 1966, with two-story annexes both in the rear and at the front. Characterized as a "strikingly new and modern building", the structure first housed the Ellsworth & Goldie gallery, then housed fabric retail stores until the 1980s.

== Architecture ==
Originally constructed as a four-story structure, the Modulightor Building has been used for commercial and residential purposes, later housing a gallery on its top floors. The original part of the building was erected from 1989 to 1994 to designs by Paul Rudolph. The Modulightor Building was one of the last buildings that Rudolph ever completed in Manhattan; unlike his other projects, it was not particularly well known. Rudolph designed only two other residential structures in Manhattan: his own residence at 23 Beekman Place and the Halston townhouse at 101 East 63rd Street. Mark Squeo, who had collaborated with Rudolph in the 1990s, designed the upper stories, which were built in the 2010s.

Rudolph experimented with various features in the design of the Modulightor Building, using details popularized by such architects as Frank Lloyd Wright, Ludwig Mies van der Rohe, and Le Corbusier. Even though Rudolph had completed the building not long before he died, he used it to test out various theories regarding the use and configuration of space. Rudolph's colleague Ernst Wagner, a Swiss man who had been a longtime resident of the building, said that the design reflected the fact that the Modulightor Building was "very much a building Paul built for himself". Curbed similarly wrote in 2026 that the building had functioned as Rudolph's architectural laboratory.

=== Exterior ===
==== Facade ====
The main elevation of the facade is to the north, along 58th Street. Both the main facade and the rear facade are composed of overlapping, interlocking rectangles made of white I-beams. According to the New York City Landmarks Preservation Commission (LPC), the interlocking nature of the beams gives the facade a quality similar to a jigsaw puzzle, contrasting with the row houses that adjoining it. The western facade is a white party wall with narrow windows on the fifth and sixth stories, while the eastern facade has narrow windows on the fourth story, fifth story, and rooftop deck.

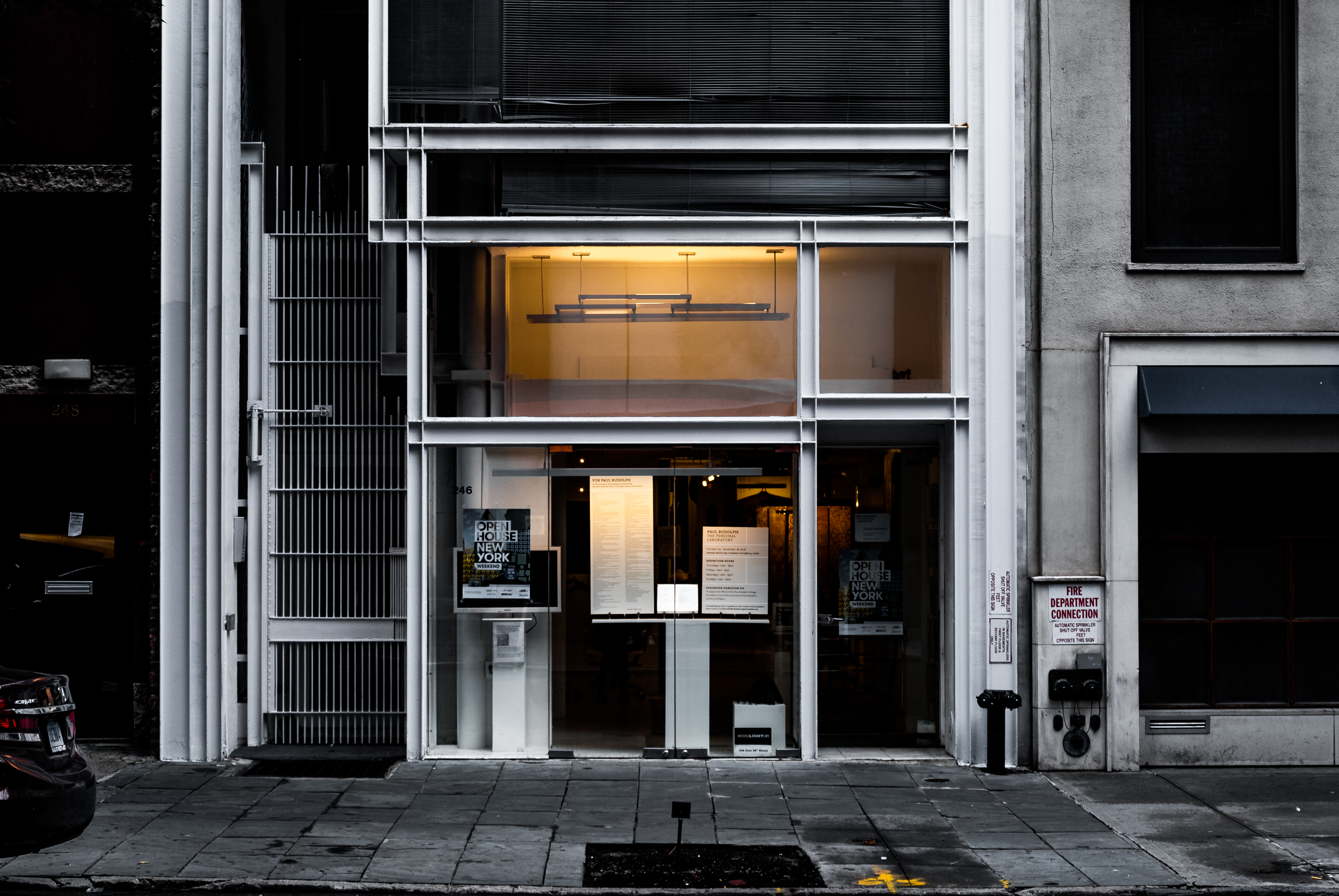
Detail of the main entrance

The main elevation is about 3 feet (0.91 m) deep and includes concrete panels for structural support. The I-beams were manufactured to three different widths. The vertical beams are largely 4.25 inches (108 mm) deep, except for those at the far western and eastern edges, which are 8.25 inches (210 mm) deep; the horizontal beams are 6.25 inches (159 mm) deep. Though the rectangles generally contain glass windows, a few openings on the facade are filled with concrete blocks, and other openings contain wooden doors. There is an entrance on the left (east) side of the facade, which is screened by a gate with vertical metal bars; the left wall of this entrance has a lattice with plants, while the door itself is topped by a planting box. Another entrance on the right (west) side of the facade leads to a showroom at the ground level, with a recessed glass door and a marble pavement. The center of the first-floor facade has a tripartite display window.

The rear elevation has fewer I-beams than the main elevation, although the windows are larger. The lowest two stories have not been modified since the 1960s. These stories span the lot's width; there is a skylight above the second floor. The third floor, designed by Rudolph, has a steel-grated wood deck spanning the lot's width, with mechanical equipment on one end and a hot tub on the opposite end. There is a door at the deck's eastern end, which ascends to a door with a transom window above it; a greenhouse is located to the west of this door. The fourth floor of the facade was also designed by Rudolph. The two stories above, which were built during Squeo's redesign, contain four metal balconies of different sizes.

==== Roof ====
There is a rooftop deck with gray tiles, which is surrounded by glass-and-metal parapets to the north and south. The rooftop deck connects with one of the balconies in the rear, and a skylight is raised above the western part of the roof deck. The front portion of the rooftop deck has a glass-walled elevator foyer with glass doors, which adjoins an enclosed staircase descending to the sixth floor. There is a second, outdoor staircase to the sixth floor at the center of the deck; its balustrade is a metal grid with a handrail, and the stair risers have gaps between them.

=== Interior ===
As designed, the showroom of the Modulightor company was intended to be on the first floor, while the story immediately above was to be Rudolph's office. The third and fourth floors were to contain two duplex apartments (later combined into one). Another apartment was added on the fifth and sixth floors in the 2010s; these were part of Rudolph's original plans but not completed during his lifetime. The Modulightor shop is connected to the upper floors via a stair in the rear.

As of 2024, the building holds Modulightor's fabrication center in the basement and on the first floor. The store sells lighting fixtures, including lamps similar to those at Rudolph's house on 23 Beekman Place. The remaining spaces house the Paul Rudolph Institute for Modern Architecture, which hosts events and exhibits at the apartment. The institute gives periodic tours of the duplex, opening it to the public twice monthly. The Rudolph Foundation, which occupied the building until 2014, also hosted tours and rented out the space for events. The building's interior is the only Rudolph–designed space in New York City that is ordinarily open to the public.

==== Third- and fourth-floor duplex ====
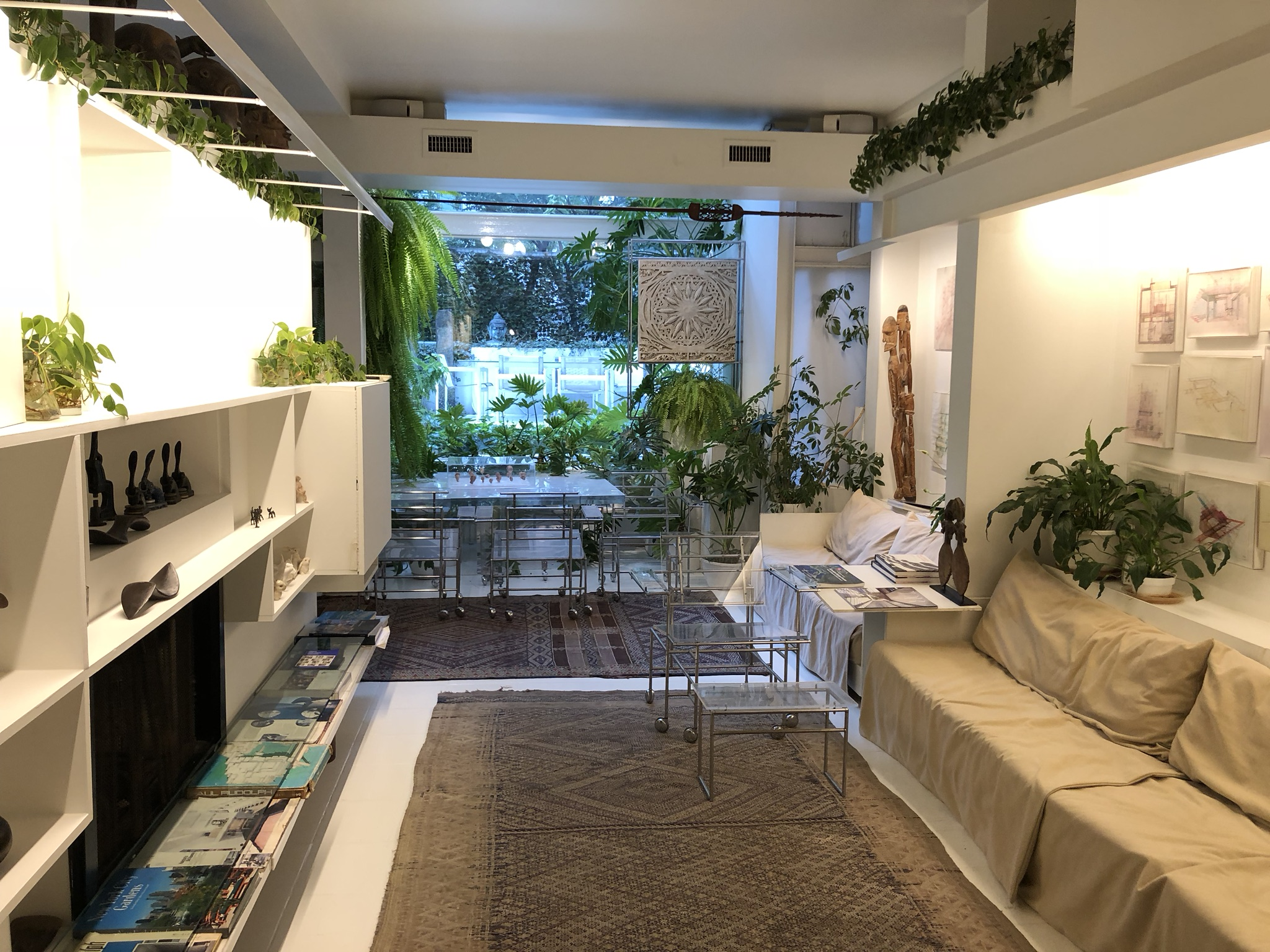
The duplex's south living room

The third- and fourth-floor duplex apartment spans about 3,000 square feet (280 m^{2}). It has four bedrooms, four bathrooms, two balconies between the floors, two living rooms, and a kitchen divided into northern and southern sections. The duplex is decorated in a white palette throughout, with white built-in furniture. The rooms are interconnected spaces that blend into one another, which according to the LPC were intended to make the spaces appear larger than they actually were. They have decorations such as floating houseplants, cantilevered stairs, banisters, and bookshelves. The staircases, balconies, and glass walls in these rooms may be inspired by the designs of the Pavillon de l'Esprit Nouveau model home and Unité d'Habitation of Berlin, both designed by Le Corbusier. There are also decorations such as metal beams and grated sections of floor, in addition to lighting made by Modulightor. When Wagner and Rudolph occupied the building, the duplex was decorated with objects such as African sculptures, Japanese figurines, Turkish machine parts, boomerangs, shoe forms, cigar molds, gold chargers, and masks.

On the third floor, the northern and southern living rooms are connected by a north–south hallway along the eastern side of the house, which leads to an elevator and the main stairway to the ground. The L-shaped north living room wraps around a bathroom to the east. The southern wall of the north living room has a door to the hallway, while the eastern wall has a metal fireplace mantel and wooden cabinets. There are shelves and a sofa on the western wall (adjoining a staircase to the northern balcony), while the northern wall adjoins a terrace. On the western side of the house, the two sections of the kitchen are separated by a wall with a door. The northern half includes a refrigerator and oven, while the southern half contains a stovetop, fume hood, and sinks; both sections include shelves, cabinets, and white counters. The south living room is also L-shaped, wrapping around a bathroom to the east. Within the south living room, another staircase near the kitchen ascends to the southern balcony. The eastern wall has a metal fireplace mantel and wooden cabinets; the southeast corner has a window and desk; and the western side has a steel beam above two sofas. Along the southern wall of the south living room is an alcove, which has a double-height ceiling and a door leading to the rear garden.

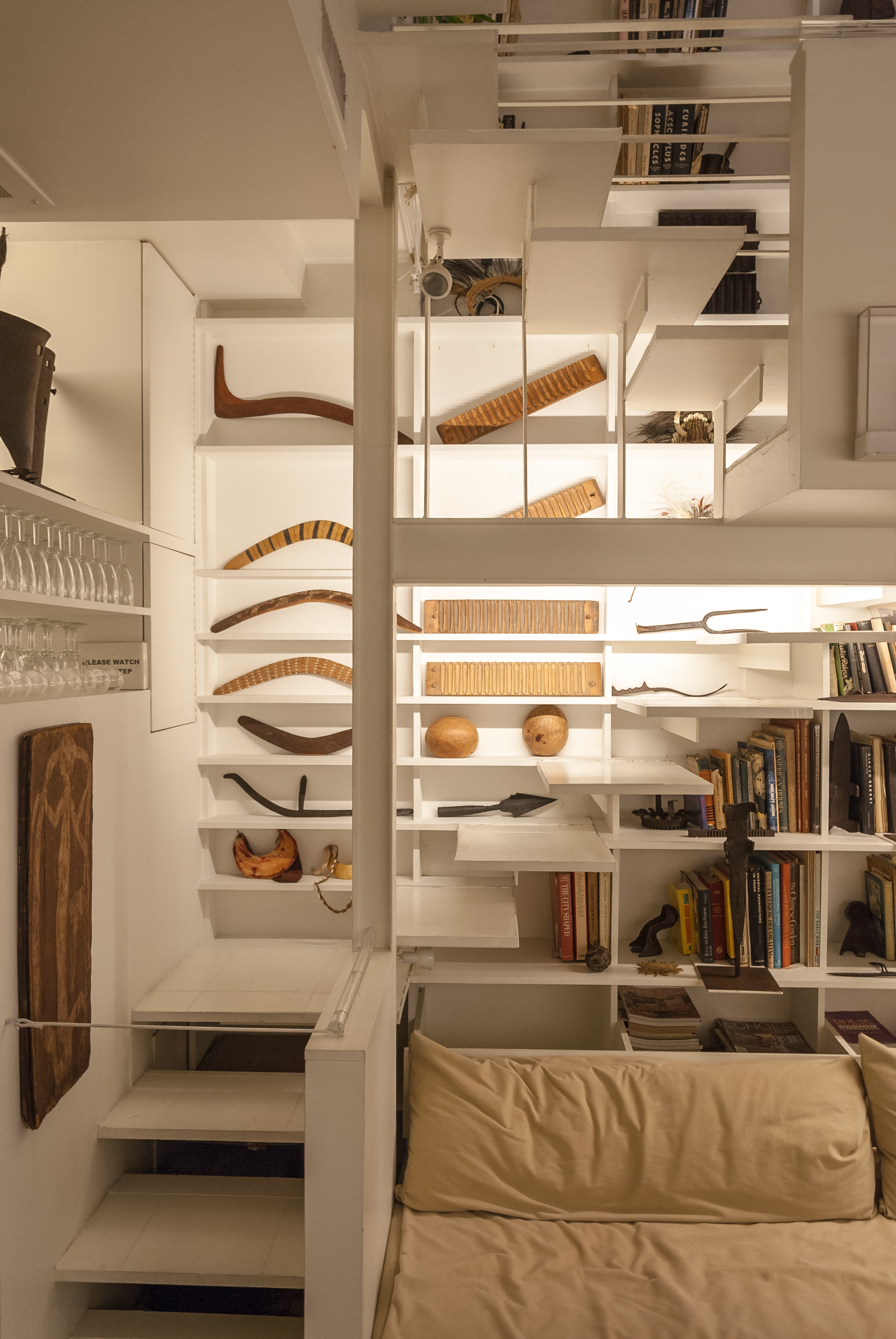
The third and fourth floors are connected by cantilevered stairs, which have treads that appear to float.

The northern and southern halves of the fourth floor each have two bedrooms and a bathroom; these are connected by a north–south passageway to the east, which lead to the elevator and main stair. The LPC labels them as north bedroom 1, north bedroom 2, south bedroom 2, and south bedroom 1 from north to south. There are two light wells overlooking the third floor, one adjoining each pair of bedrooms. North bedroom 1 spans the building's width and has a door to a small exterior terrace at its northeast corner, a door to the north bathroom at its southeast corner, and a stair to the northern balcony. Both the north and south number-2 bedrooms are located near the center of the house, with shelves on their western walls. Each bedroom adjoins a stairway, which leads to the light well and balcony on its respective side of the house, and can also be accessed from the passageway. South bedroom 1 spans the building's width and has a door to the south bathroom at its northeast corner, a link directly to the fourth-floor passageway, and a door at the southeast corner descending to the third-story alcove and the rear garden. The bathrooms on the north and south sides can be accessed from the respective number-1 bedroom or the passageway, and they contain cabinets, a sink, a tub, and a toilet.

== History ==
The building is named for the Modulightor lighting company, which Wagner and Rudolph had cofounded in 1976; the firm built prototypes of lamps and other lighting fixtures designed by the two men. Originally, the firm was located at 54 West 57th Street in Midtown Manhattan. Modulightor had manufactured lighting fixtures for 23 Beekman Place, Rudolph's Manhattan townhouse, as well as for his other structures. The company had a workshop in SoHo, but the workshop's lease was about to expire by 1988, when Wagner noticed that the structure at 246 East 58th Street was for sale. The owner, MIRA-X International Furnishings Inc, sold the building on February 24, 1989, to Rudolph and Wagner for $1.75 million.

=== Original structure ===
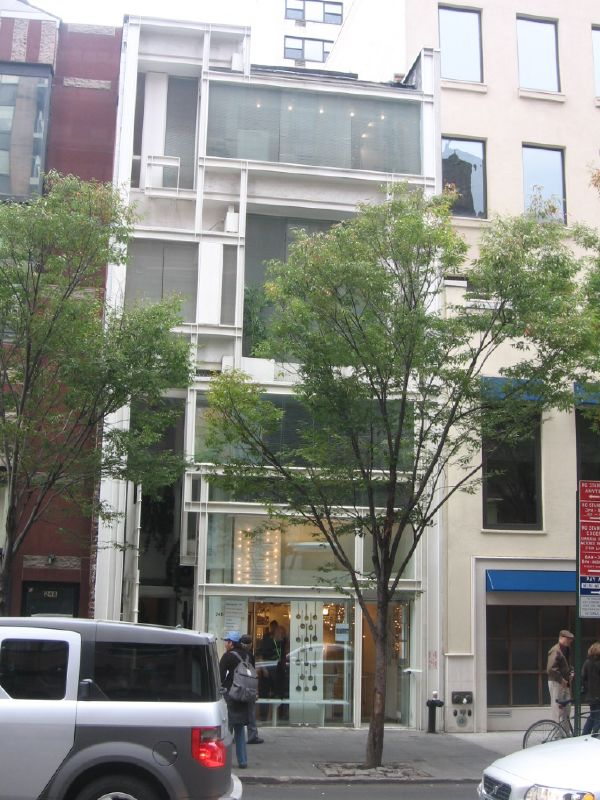
The facade seen in 2006

Originally, Donald Luckenbill oversaw the project between 1989 and 1990; Luckenbill reflected that Rudolph had conducted hundreds of studies of the building's facade. Mark Squeo took over the design after 1990. Rudolph frequently added, adjusted, or removed features during the building's construction, which led to persistent shortages. The Paul Rudolph Institute's president Kelvin Dickinson described the Modulightor Building as a passion project of Rudolph's, estimating that Rudolph ran out of money three times. Wagner later recalled Rudolph telling him, "Ernst, I remain an architect", despite Wagner's trepidation about Rudolph's persistence.

The facade panels at the front and rear were being installed by mid-1992, and the beams on the facade were being painted by early 1993. A temporary certificate of occupancy was granted for the building's first basement, the ground-story retail space, and an office mezzanine in May 1993. In June of the following year, another certificate of occupancy was granted for both basement levels and the four above-ground stories. The temporary certificate of occupancy provided for two duplex apartments on the third and fourth floors—one each on the south and north sides of both floors. By that July, Rudolph had completed plans for the duplexes and began leasing out these apartments. Rental income from these apartments was used to help pay off the building's mortgage. The Modulightor store's space was completed in 1996.

Rudolph hosted lectures and meetings with architects in the duplexes after the building was completed. Rudolph was diagnosed with mesothelioma, or asbestos cancer, toward the end of his life, becoming ill by 1996. That year, MTV founder John Lack agreed to rent both duplexes. Lack agreed to pay $6,000 per month, living in the southern duplex, and his daughter took over the northern duplex. Rudolph attempted to give his home at 23 Beekman Place to the Library of Congress so the library could preserve his documents after he died, but the Library of Congress instead sold the Beekman Place apartment. Instead, in April 1997, Rudolph bequeathed a partial ownership stake in the Modulightor Building to Wagner. Rudolph ultimately died that August.

=== After Rudolph's death ===
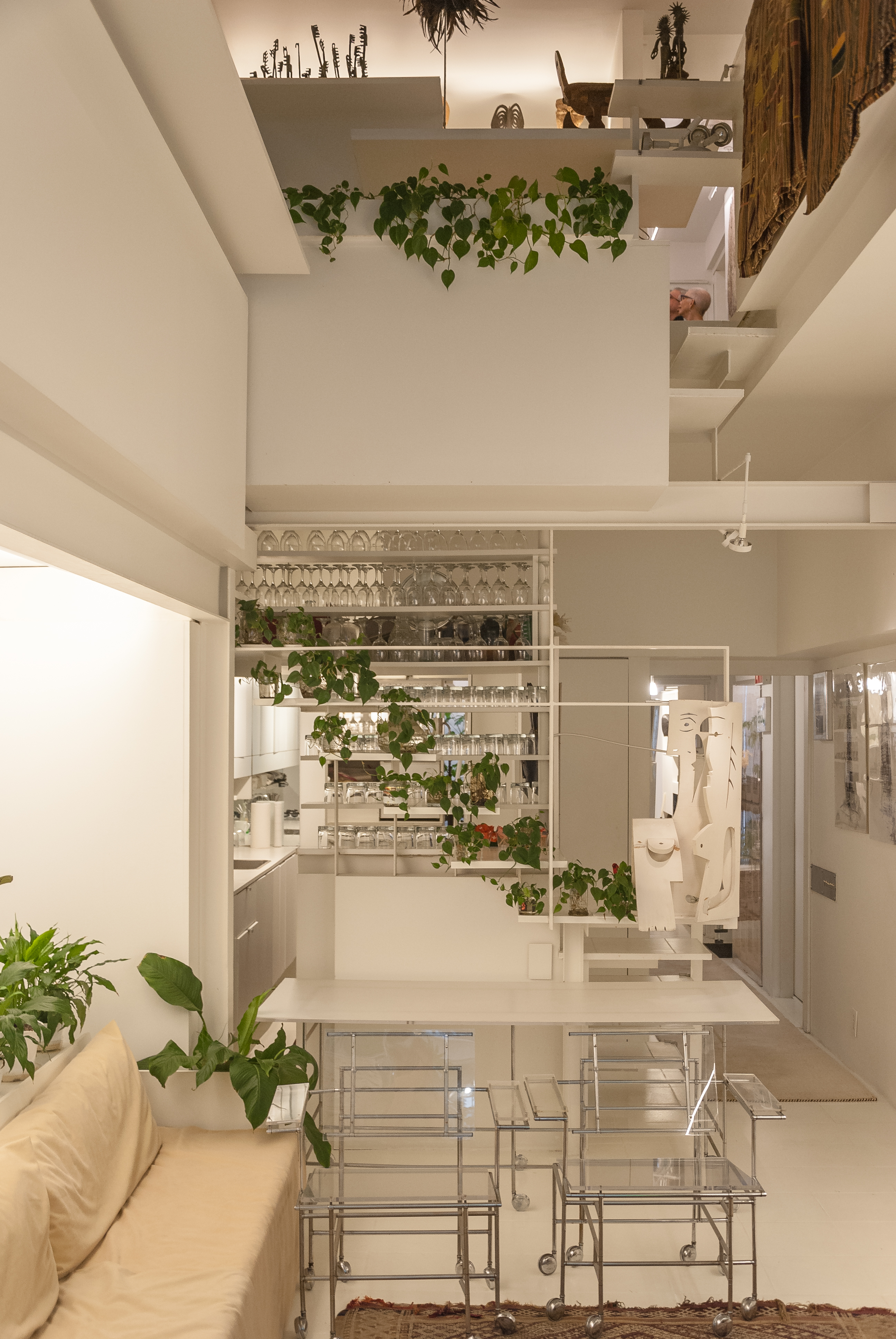
The third- and fourth-story duplex's kitchen

Wagner began seeking a buyer for Rudolph's other residence at 23 Beekman Place in 1998, though it would not be sold for two years. Meanwhile, Lack and his daughter moved out of the Modulightor Building around 1999. After a prolonged disagreement over Rudolph's will and testament, Wagner helped establish the Paul Rudolph Foundation c. 2001 or 2002. Wagner moved to the building in either 2000 or 2002, and Luckenbill subsequently combined the building's two apartments. This work involved removing a wall between the northern and southern duplex units, as well as adding shelves to store Rudolph's work, similar to those at 23 Beekman Place. The enlarged duplex was completed in 2003, and the structure was known as the Modulightor Building by the next year. The duplex began hosting events as well. For example, Wagner opened his apartment to the public once a month starting in 2005, and Open House New York began hosting annual events there that year. The Rudolph Foundation also opened the building during the evenings starting in 2007, allowing people to view the lighting designs.

Mark Squeo designed an expansion of the building after Rudolph's death. He drew up plans for the fifth and sixth floors of the building starting in October 2007, using Rudolph's preliminary designs for a six-story building on the site. Actual construction started c. 2010–2011; the modifications largely adhered to Rudolph's drawings, with some modifications such as the removal of a triplex penthouse and the addition of balconies. Wagner evicted the Paul Rudolph Foundation after a disagreement in 2014, in which he was voted off the foundation's board. He created a competing organization, the Paul Rudolph Heritage Foundation (later the Institute for Modern Architecture), which was headquartered at the building. Following the completion of the building's top floors in 2016, they were opened to the public. The fashion house Bottega Veneta hosted a fashion show there in early 2017, and the upper stories hosted the Archtober festival that October. An exhibition called Paul Rudolph: The Personal Laboratory was hosted on the upper stories in 2018 to celebrate Rudolph's 100th birthday. The Paul Rudolph Foundation later sued the Paul Rudolph Heritage Foundation; they settled their dispute in 2023.

Unlike many of Rudolph's other designs, the Modulightor Building remained in good condition after Rudolph's death, and Wagner continued to give private tours of the third- and fourth-story duplex. The LPC designated the Modulightor Building's exterior as a landmark in December 2023. The same year, Wagner gave the building to the Paul Rudolph Institute, which at the time wanted to convert it to a study center and historic house museum. The Metropolitan Museum of Art displayed a model of the building in a 2024 exhibition about Rudolph's work. In December 2024, the third- and fourth-floor duplex was nominated for interior landmark status. The duplex had not been eligible for landmark designation before then, as New York City designated landmarks were required to be at least 30 years old. On May 6, 2025, the LPC designated the duplex as an interior landmark. By the 2020s, the duplex hosted events and was opened twice a month.

== Reception ==
The Modulightor Building initially received little notice from either the news media or architectural critics, who did not begin seriously reporting on the building until the 2000s. Joseph Giovannini of The New York Times wrote in 2004, "Like Italian architects carving Renaissance and Baroque facades to be revealed in Mediterranean light, Rudolph succeeded in suggesting depth within shallow dimensions." William Menking of the Architects' Journal, writing the same year, regarded it as a "superb Modernist storefront" that dwarfed contemporary structures such as the Lescaze House, the Rockefeller Guest House, and 23 Beekman Place in quality. Metropolis Magazine described the building's exterior as "an incredible lattice of mullions and frames", while a critic for The Guardian characterized it as "a plexiglass and plasterboard palace that feels as if it might reconfigure itself at any moment". A writer for Wallpaper magazine regarded in 2025 it as an example of Rudolph's "mastery of depth and willingness to experiment". The following year, Curbed wrote that the Modulightor Building's facade was distinctive, "but it's inside where Rudolph’s design philosophy really shines".

The interior also received commentary. Giovannini praised how Rudolph had managed to create a complex interior from commercially available materials. Menking likened the interiors to London's Sir John Soane's Museum, saying the design blurred the traditional boundaries between rooms, much like Frank Lloyd Wright's work. A Village Voice reporter wrote in 2005 that the interior of the duplex "offers a glimpse of what might have been if we hadn't gotten lazy and gone all reactionary with our houses", noting that its interlocking spaces were not child-friendly. The next year, Elements of Living magazine described the top floors as "a brilliant orchestration of spatial layers and reflective materials that combine to create a series of magical lighting compositions". The New York Times called it a "white-on-white wonder", while Metropolis likened the interior to a white-clad forest or cave. Cereal Magazine characterized the interior as a "complex arrangement of solid planes and framed, negative spaces". Another writer described the Modulightor Building as "a light-filled jewel of a house, an artificial geode, so conceptually integrated that when you're inside the outside world seems ready to invade". Conversely, Martin Filler of The New York Review of Books described the design as a symptom of Rudolph's "incorrigible urge to overcomplicate things" in his later career, despite liking the architect's early work.

== See also ==
- List of New York City Designated Landmarks in Manhattan from 14th to 59th Streets
