= List of New York City Designated Landmarks in Manhattan from 14th to 59th Streets =

The New York City Landmarks Preservation Commission (LPC), formed in 1965, is the New York City governmental commission that administers the city's Landmarks Preservation Law. Since its founding, it has designated over a thousand landmarks, classified into four categories: individual landmarks, interior landmarks, scenic landmarks, and historic districts.

The New York City borough of Manhattan contains a high concentration of designated landmarks, interior landmarks and historic districts. The section of Manhattan between 14th Street and 59th Street includes Midtown Manhattan and other neighborhoods, and includes numerous individual landmarks, interior landmarks, and historic districts, as well as two scenic landmarks. The following is an incomplete list. Some of these are also National Historic Landmark (NHL) sites, and NHL status is noted where known.

source: ;; date listed is date of designation;

== Historic districts ==
Landmark name	Date designated
Chelsea Historic District	September 15, 1970 ; extension: February 3, 1981
East 17th Street/Irving Place Historic District	June 30, 1998
Gramercy Park Historic District	September 20, 1966; extension: July 12, 1988
Ladies' Mile Historic District	May 2, 1989
Lamartine Place Historic District	October 13, 2009
Madison Square North Historic District	June 26, 2001
Murray Hill Historic District	January 29, 2002 ; extension: March 30, 2004
Sniffen Court Historic District	June 21, 1966
Stuyvesant Square Historic District	September 23, 1975
Tudor City Historic District	May 17, 1988
Turtle Bay Gardens Historic District	June 21, 1966
West Chelsea Historic District	July 15, 2008

== Individual landmarks ==
=== 1–9 ===
Landmark name	Image	Date designated
126, 128, 130–132, 136 & 140 West 18th Street Stables (individually designated)		December 11, 1990, , , ,
13 and 15 West 54th Street Houses		February 3, 1981 ,
130 West 30th Street Building		November 13, 2001
130 West 57th Street Studio Building		October 19, 1999
140 West 57th Street Studio Building (The Beaufort)		October 19, 1999
144 West 14th Street		November 18, 2008
145 & 147 Eighth Avenue Houses		November 17, 2009 ,
152 East 38th Street House		May 25, 1967
18 East 41st Street		November 22, 2016
2 Park Avenue Building		April 18, 2006
23rd Police Precinct Station House (now Traffic Control Division)		December 15, 1998
240 Central Park South Apartments		June 25, 2002
275 Madison Avenue Building (22 East 40th Street)		January 13, 2009
29th Street Towers		August 12, 2025
311 and 313 East 58th Street Houses 40.76°N 73.964°W		May 25, 1967 ,
312 and 314 East 53rd Street Houses		June 12, 1968 , June 20, 2000
326, 328 & 330 East 18th Street Houses		March 20, 1970
400 Madison Avenue Building 40.7776°N 73.9612°W		November 22, 2016
437–459 West 24th Street (individually designated)		September 15, 1970, , , , , , , , , ,
47, 49, 51, 53 & 55 West 28th Street Tin Pan Alley (individually designated)		December 10, 2019, , , ,
5, 7, 9, 17, 19, 21 & 23 West 16th Street Houses (individually designated)		May 1, 1990, ,, , , ,
5 West 54th Street House (Dr. Moses Allen Starr Residence)		February 3, 1981
500 Fifth Avenue Building		December 14, 2010
574 Sixth Avenue Building		August 14, 1990
7 West 54th Street (Philip and Carrie Lehman House)		February 3, 1981
9–11 West 54th Street House (James J. Goodwin Residence)		February 3, 1981

=== A–L ===
Landmark name	Image	Date designated
former Aberdeen Hotel		January 30, 2001
Actors Studio (Seventh Associate Presbyterian Church) (432 West 44th Street)		February 19, 1991
Aeolian Building (Elizabeth Arden Building) (689 Fifth Ave & 54th St)		December 10, 2002
Algonquin Hotel		September 15, 1987
Jonathan W. Allen Stable		June 17, 1997
Allerton 39th Street House		March 18, 2008
B. Altman and Company Building		March 12, 1985
Alvin Theatre (Neil Simon Theatre)		August 6, 1985
Alwyn Court Apartments		June 7, 1966
America-Israel Cultural Foundation (William H. Moore House)		January 11, 1967
American Academy of Dramatic Arts		May 17, 1966
American Fine Arts Society		December 10, 1968
American Radiator Building (American Standard Building)		November 12, 1974
Amster Yard		June 21, 1966
ANTA Theatre (Guild Theatre, Virginia Theatre, August Wilson Theatre)		August 6, 1985
Appellate Division of the Supreme Court of the State of New York, First Department		June 7, 1966
Asser Levy Public Baths		March 19, 1974
Association of the Bar of the City of New York, The		May 10, 1966
AT&T Corporate Headquarters Building (later Sony Plaza, now 550 Madison Avenue)		July 31, 2018
Bank of the Metropolis		July 12, 1988
Barbey Building 17-15 West 38th Street 40.7527°N 73.9862°W		August 12, 2025
Barrymore Theatre		November 4, 1987
Beaux-Arts Apartments (310 East 44th Street)		July 11, 1989
Beaux-Arts Institute of Design (304 East 44th Street)		August 23, 1988
Belasco Theatre		November 4, 1987
Bergdorf Goodman Building (754 Fifth Avenue)		December 13, 2016
Beverly Hotel 125 East 50th Street AKA The Benjamin Hotel 40.765°N 73.972°W		November 22, 2016
Joseph B. and Josephine H. Bissell House, 46 West 55th Street		March 23, 2010
Booth Theatre		November 4, 1987
George S. Bowdoin Stable (149 East 38th Street)		June 17, 1997
Bowery Savings Bank Building		September 17, 1996
Brill Building		March 23, 2010
Broadhurst Theatre		November 10, 1987
Brooks Atkinson Theatre (Mansfield Theatre)		November 4, 1987
Bryant Park Studios (80 West 40th St)		December 13, 1988
Middleton S. and Emilie Neilson Burrill House (36 East 38th Street)		July 27, 2010
Bush Tower		October 18, 1988
Louis H. Chalif Normal School of Dancing (Columbia Artists Management Inc. (Cami) Building)		October 19, 1999
Carnegie Hall		June 20, 1967
Catholic Apostolic Church (Church for All Nations) (417 West 57th St)		February 27, 2001
CBS Building		October 21, 1997
Central Synagogue (Congregation Ahawath Chesed Shaar Hashomayim)		June 7, 1966
Century Association		January 11, 1967
Century Association Building (former)		January 5, 1993
Century Building		October 7, 1986
Chanin Building		November 14, 1978
Chrysler Building		September 12, 1978
Church Missions House/Protestant Welfare Agencies Building		September 11, 1979
Church of St. Mary the Virgin (Church, Clergy House, Mission House, Rectory and Lady Chapel), 145 W. 46th St.		December 19, 1989
Church of the Holy Apostles		October 19, 1966
Church of the Holy Communion and Sisters' House and Chapel and Rectory		April 19, 1966 ,
Church of the Incarnation and Parish House		September 11, 1979
Church of the Transfiguration (Little Church Around the Corner) and Rectory		May 25, 1967 ,
former Citicorp Center, including St. Peter's Church (601 Lexington Avenue)		December 6, 2016
City Center 55th Street Theatre (Mecca Temple)		April 12, 1983
Civic Club (Estonian House)		March 28, 1978
Thomas B. and Fanny Clarke Residence (Collectors Club)		September 11, 1979
Consolidated Edison Building		February 10, 2009
former Coty Building, 714 5th Ave at 56th St 40°45′44″N 73°58′29″W		January 29, 1985
Mary Hale Cunningham House (124 East 55th St) 40.7598°N 73.9708°W		May 1, 2001
Daily News Building		July 28, 1981
Decker Building		July 12, 1988
Joseph Raphael De Lamar House		March 25, 1975
A. T. Demarest & Company and Peerless Motor Car Company Buildings (224 West 57th Street)		December 19, 2000
Adelaide L. T. Douglas Residence (57 Park Avenue between East 37th and 38th Streets)		September 11, 1979
Frederick C. and Birdsall Otis Edey House (10 West 56th Street)		July 24, 2007
The Emmet Building (95 Madison Avenue)		March 6, 2018
Empire State Building		May 19, 1981
Engine Company Number 23 (215 West 58th Street)		August 29, 1989
Engineers' Club Building (32 West 40th Street)		March 22, 2011
Martin Erdmann Residence (57 East 55th Street)		November 22, 2016
Everett Building		September 6, 1988
James Farley United States Post Office		May 17, 1966
Fashion Tower 40.752°N 73.989°W		August 12, 2025
E. Hayward Ferry and Amelia Parsons Ferry House		November 10, 2009
Fire Engine Company No. 54 (Former)		November 18, 2008
Fire Engine Company No. 65 (33 West 43rd Street)		October 2, 1990
Fisk–Harkness House (12 East 53rd Street)		June 28, 2011
Flatiron Building		September 20, 1966
Ford Foundation Building		October 21, 1997
Forty-Sixth Street Theatre (Chanin's Forty-Sixth Street Theatre)		November 17, 1987
Fred F. French Building		March 18, 1986
Free Public Baths of the City of New York, East 54th Street Bath and Gymnasium, 348 E54th St		May 10, 2011
Friends Meeting House (28 Gramercy Park South (144 East 20th Street))		October 26, 1965
Friends Meeting House and Friends Seminary (Rutherford Place/16th Street)		December 9, 1969
Fuller Building		March 18, 1986
Furcraft Building		August 12, 2025
Gainsborough Studios (222 Central Park South)		February 16, 1988
General Electric Building (formerly the RCA Victor Building; 570 Lexington Avenue)		July 9, 1985
Gerard, The		July 27, 1982
Germania Life Insurance Company Building		September 6, 1988
Gilsey Hotel		September 11, 1979
Goelet Building (Swiss Center Building)		January 14, 1992
Golden Theatre (Theatre Masque)		November 17, 1987
B. F. Goodrich Company Building (1780 Broadway) 40°45′59.5″N 73°58′53.5″W		November 10, 2009
Gorham Manufacturing Company Building (889 Broadway at East 19th Street)		June 19, 1984
Gorham Building (390 Fifth Avenue at West 36th Street)		December 15, 1998
The Gotham Hotel (The Peninsula)		June 6, 1989
Helen Miller Gould Stable (Former) 213 West 58th Street 40.76655°N 73.9803°W		August 29, 1989
Grand Central Terminal		August 2, 1967
Grand Hotel		September 11, 1979
Graybar Building (420 Lexington Avenue)		November 22, 2016
Greenwich Savings Bank (Crossland Federal Savings Bank)		March 3, 1992
Guardian Life Insurance Company of America Annex 105 East 17th Street		November 18, 2008
Hampton Shops Building (18–20 East 50th Street)		November 22, 2016
Harvard Club of New York City, The		January 11, 1967
Haskins & Sells Building 35 West 39th Street		January 11, 2011
Hearst Magazine Building		February 16, 1988
Henry Miller's Theatre		December 8, 1987
High School of the Performing Arts		December 21, 1982
Historic Street Lampposts		June 17, 1997
L. P. Hollander & Company Building (Former)		June 17, 2003
Harry B. and Evelina Hollins Residence		June 19, 1984
Hotel Chelsea		March 15, 1966
Hotel Lexington (511 Lexington Avenue)		November 22, 2016
Hotel Mansfield (12 West 44th Street)		June 12, 2012
Hotel Martinique		May 5, 1998
Hotel Wolcott (4 West 31st Street)		December 20, 2011
Hudson Theatre		November 17, 1987
IRT Powerhouse 855–869 Eleventh Avenue, between W. 58th and W. 59th Streets		December 5, 2017
James Earl Jones Theatre		November 17, 1987
Japan Society (New York) Headquarters		March 22, 2011
The Knickerbocker Hotel		October 18, 1988
Knox Building		September 23, 1980
Lambs Club		September 24, 1974
James F. D. Lanier Residence		September 11, 1979
Lefcourt Clothing Center		August 12, 2025
Lescaze House		January 27, 1976
Lever House		November 9, 1982
Lincoln Building		July 12, 1988
Lithuanian Alliance Building 40.750063°N 73.995793°W		April 7, 2026
Little Theatre (Helen Hayes Theatre)		November 17, 1987
Edith Andrews Logan Residence (17 West 56th St)		October 6, 2009
Longacre Theatre		December 8, 1987
Look Building		July 27, 2010
Lord & Taylor Building (Fifth Avenue)		October 30, 2007
former Lord & Taylor Building (Broadway)		November 15, 1977
Lunt-Fontanne Theatre (Globe Theatre)		December 8, 1987
Lyceum Theatre		November 26, 1974

=== M–Z ===
Landmark name	Image	Date designated
R. H. Macy & Co. Store, 14th Street Annex (56 West 14th Street)		December 20, 2011
Madison Belmont Building (181 Madison Avenue @ 34th Street)		September 20, 2011
Majestic Theatre		December 8, 1987
Jerome Mansion (Manhattan Club)		November 23, 1965
Manufacturers Hanover Trust Company Building (600 Fifth Avenue Building), former Sinclair Oil 40.7576°N 73.9783°W		April 23, 1985
Manufacturers Trust Company Building (510 Fifth Avenue at West 43rd Street)		October 21, 1997
Marble Collegiate Reformed Church		January 11, 1967
Mark Hellinger Theatre (Hollywood Theatre) (235 W51st St)		January 5, 1988
Martha Washington Hotel (30 West 30th Street)		June 19, 2012
Martin Beck Theatre		November 4, 1987
McGraw-Hill Building		September 11, 1979
Mechanics' and Trademen's Institute (Berkeley School)		October 18, 1988
Metropolitan Life Insurance Company Tower		June 13, 1989
I. Miller Building (1522–1524 Bwy & 46 St)		June 29, 1999
Mills Hotel No. 3		October 28, 2014
Phelps Stokes – J. P. Morgan Jr. House (Morgan Library), 231 Madison Ave & 37th		February 26, 2002
Modulightor Building		December 19, 2023
Pierpont Morgan Library and Annex, The		May 17, 1966
Music Box Theatre		December 8, 1987
New Amsterdam Theatre		October 23, 1979
New York Central Building		March 31, 1987
New York House and School of Industry		October 2, 1990
New York Life Building		October 24, 2000
New York Public Library Main Branch		January 11, 1967
New York Public Library, Muhlenberg Branch		January 30, 2001
New York Savings Bank		June 8, 1988
New York Times Building (Times Annex)		April 24, 2001
New York Yacht Club Building		September 11, 1979
Andrew Norwood House		May 9, 1978
Old Grolier Club, The (Gilbert Kiamie House)		August 18, 1970
Osborne Apartments		August 13, 1991
Panhellenic Tower (Beekman Tower Hotel) (East 49th St)		February 3, 1998
Paramount Building		November 1, 1988
Pepsi-Cola Building (Former) (ABN-Amro Bank Building) (500 Park Ave)		June 20, 1995
Paramount Hotel		November 17, 2009
Pershing Square Viaduct (Park Avenue Viaduct)		September 23, 1980
John Peirce Residence (11 E51st St) 40°45′32″N 73°58′33″W		June 23, 2009
Pershing Square Building (125 Park Avenue)		November 22, 2016
Morton F. Plant House (now Cartier)		July 14, 1970
Players Club		March 15, 1966
Plaza Hotel		December 9, 1969
Plymouth Theatre		December 8, 1987
Pratt-New York Phoenix School of Design (New York School of Applied Design for Women)		May 10, 1977
Racquet and Tennis Club Building		May 6, 1979
Ritz Tower, 465 Park Avenue		October 29, 2002
Rizzoli Building (712 Fifth Avenue)		January 29, 1985
James Hampden Robb and Cornelia Van Rensselaer Robb House 23 Park Avenue at 35th Street		November 17, 1998
Rockefeller Apartments, 17 W 54th and 24 West 55th Street 40°45′43″N 73°58′53″W		June 19, 1984
Rockefeller Center		April 23, 1985
Rockefeller Guest House, 242 East 52nd Street		December 5, 2000
Rodin Studios, 200 West 57th Street		February 16, 1988
Theodore Roosevelt House		March 15, 1966
Royale Theatre		December 15, 1987
Paul Rudolph Penthouse & Apartments, 23 Beekman Pl		November 16, 2010
Russell Sage Foundation Building and Annex		June 20, 2000
St. Bartholomew's Church and Community House		March 16, 1967
St. George's Church		June 20, 1967
St. James Theatre (Erlanger Theater)		December 15, 1987
St. Louis Hotel (Hotel Grand Union, 34 East 32nd St.)		June 25, 2013
St. Patrick's Cathedral, Lady Chapel, Rectory and Cardinal's Residence		October 19, 1966
St. Regis Hotel 799 Fifth Ave & 55th St		November 1, 1988
St. Stephens Church (Church of Our Lady of the Scapular & St. Stephen)		October 28, 2008
St. Thomas' Church and St. Thomas' Parish House		October 19, 1966
Saks Fifth Avenue Building		December 20, 1984
Salvation Army National and Territorial Headquarters, 120–130 West 14th Street		October 17, 2017
Morris B. Sanders Studio & Apartment 219 East 49th Street		November 18, 2008
former Scheffel Hall		June 24, 1997
Scribner Building (United Synagogue of America)		September 14, 1976
Charles Scribner's Sons Building		March 23, 1982
Seagram Building		October 3, 1989
Henry Seligman House		July 24, 2007
Hotel Seville (now the James Nomad Hotel; 22 East 29th Street or 88 Madison Avenue)		March 6, 2018
Shelton Hotel (252 Lexington Avenue)		November 22, 2016
Shubert Theatre		December 15, 1987
Sidewalk clock at 200 Fifth Avenue		August 25, 1981
Sidewalk Clock, 522 Fifth Avenue		August 25, 1981
Sixty-Ninth Regiment Armory		April 12, 1983
Society House of the American Society of Civil Engineers (220 West 57th Street)		December 16, 2008
Socony-Mobil Building		February 25, 2003
Springs Mills Building (140 West 40th Street)		April 13, 2010
Starrett-Lehigh Building		October 7, 1986
Steinway Hall		November 13, 2001
Stewart & Company Building		April 18, 2006
Stuyvesant High School		May 20, 1997
Summit Hotel (Doubletree Metropolitan Hotel) (166 East 51st Street)		May 17, 2005
William J. Syms Operating Theater		July 11, 1989
Tammany Hall (44 Union Square)		October 29, 2013
Tiffany Building (Former)		February 16, 1988
Samuel J. Tilden House (National Arts Club)		March 15, 1966
Town Hall		November 28, 1978
Trinity Chapel Complex (15 West 25th Street)		April 18, 1968
Union League Club (38 East 37th Street)		October 25, 2010
Union Square Savings Bank		February 13, 1996
former United States Rubber Company Building (1790 Broadway)		December 19, 2000
University Club		January 11, 1967
George W. Vanderbilt Residence (647 5th Avenue)		March 22, 1977
Henry Villard Houses		September 30, 1968
Waldorf-Astoria Hotel		January 5, 1993
The Wilbraham		June 8, 2004
The Windermere		June 28, 2005
Women's Liberation Center		June 18, 2019
Yale Club of New York City {50 Vanderbilt Avenue}		November 22, 2016
Penn Club of New York, formerly Yale Club of New York (30–32 West 44th Street)		February 9, 2010
Minnie E. Young House (19 East 54th Street)		November 22, 2016
William and Helen Martin Murphy Ziegler Jr. House (116 East 55 Street)		May 1, 2001

== Interior landmarks ==
Landmark name	Image	Date designated
200 Madison Avenue, First Floor Lobby Interior		November 9, 2021
Alvin Theater (Neil Simon Theater), First Floor Interior		August 6, 1985
Ambassador Theater, First Floor Interior		August 6, 1985
Appellate Division of the Supreme Court of the State of New York, First Department (Appellate Division Courthouse), First Floor Interior		September 22, 1981
Barrymore Theater, First Floor Interior		November 10, 1987
Belasco Theatre, First Floor Interior		November 4, 1987
Biltmore Theatre, First Floor Interior		November 10, 1987
Booth Theatre, First Floor Interior		November 4, 1987
Bowery Savings Bank Building, First Floor Interior		September 17, 1996
Broadhurst Theatre, First Floor Interior		December 15, 1987
Brooks Atkinson Theatre, First Floor Interior		November 4, 1987
Charles Scribner's Sons Building Interior, First Floor Interior		July 11, 1989
Chrysler Building, Ground Floor Interior		September 12, 1978
Cort Theatre, First Floor Interior		November 17, 1987
Daily News Building, First Floor Interior		March 10, 1998
Della Robbia Bar, Vanderbilt Hotel (Former), Ground Floor Interior		April 5, 1994
Ed Sullivan Theater (Hammerstein's Theatre), First Floor Interior		January 5, 1988
Embassy Theatre, First Floor Interior		November 17, 1987
Empire State Building, Ground Floor Interior		May 19, 1981
Eugene O'Neill Theatre (Forrest Theatre), First Floor Interior		December 8, 1987
Film Center Building, First Floor Interior		November 9, 1982
Ford Foundation Building, Interior		October 21, 1997
Forty-Sixth Street Theatre (Chanin's Forty-Sixth Street Theatre), First Floor Interior		November 17, 1987
Four Seasons Restaurant, Seagram Building, Ground Floor Interior		October 3, 1989
Fuller Building, First Floor Interior		March 18, 1986
Goelet Building (Swiss Center Building), First Floor Interior		January 14, 1992
Golden Theatre (Theater Masque)		November 17, 1987
Grand Central Terminal Interior (including Main Concourse)		September 23, 1980
Greenwich Savings Bank (Crossland Federal Savings Bank), First Floor Interior		March 3, 1992
Hudson Theatre, First Floor Interior		November 17, 1987
IRT Subway System Underground Interior (33rd Street, 59th Street)		October 23, 1979
International Building Interior		April 23, 1985
Little Theatre (Helen Hayes Theatre), First Floor Interior		November 17, 1987
Longacre Theatre, First Floor Interior		December 8, 1987
Lyceum Theatre, First Floor Interior		December 8, 1987
Madison Belmont Building, Lobby Interior		September 20, 2011
Majestic Theatre, First Floor Interior		December 8, 1987
Manufacturers Trust Company Building Interior		February 15, 2011
Mark Hellinger Theatre (Hollywood Theatre)		January 5, 1988
Martin Beck Theatre, First Floor Interior		November 4, 1987
Modulightor Building Duplex		May 6, 2025
Music Box Theatre, First Floor Interior		December 8, 1987
New Amsterdam Theatre, First Floor Interior		October 23, 1979
New York Central Building/Helmsley Building, Main Floor Interior		March 31, 1987
New York Public Library interiors: Main Lobby, Central Hall, etc.		November 12, 1974
New York Public Library interiors: Rose Main Reading Room, Bill Blass Public Catalog Room		August 8, 2017
New York Savings Bank, Banking Room Interior		June 21, 1988
Palace Theatre, First Floor Interior		July 14, 1987
Plaza Hotel Interior		July 12, 2005
Plymouth Theatre, First Floor Interior		December 15, 1987
Rainbow Room, 65th floor of 30 Rockefeller Plaza		October 16, 2012
RCA Building (30 Rockefeller Plaza), Ground Floor Interior		April 23, 1985
Royale Theatre, First Floor Interior		December 15, 1987
St. James Theatre (Erlanger Theatre), First Floor Interior		December 15, 1987
Seagram Building, First Floor Interior		October 3, 1989
Shubert Theatre, First Floor Interior		December 15, 1987
Steinway & Sons Reception Room and Hallway 40°45′53.5″N 73°58′40″W		September 10, 2014
Time & Life Building, Ground Floor Interior		July 16, 2002
Town Hall, First Floor Interior		November 28, 1978
United Nations Hotel, First Floor Interiors (One UN New York) (1 & 2 United Nations Plaza)		September 20, 2016
Waldorf-Astoria Hotel Interiors		March 7, 2017
Winter Garden Theatre, First Floor Interior		January 5, 1988

== Scenic landmarks ==
Landmark name	Date designated
Bryant Park	November 12, 1974
Grand Army Plaza	July 23, 1974

== See also ==
- List of New York City Designated Landmarks in Manhattan below 14th Street
- List of New York City Designated Landmarks in Manhattan from 59th to 110th Streets
- List of New York City Designated Landmarks in Manhattan above 110th Street
- National Register of Historic Places listings in New York County, New York
- List of National Historic Landmarks in New York City
