= 152 East 38th Street =

Historic house in Manhattan, New York

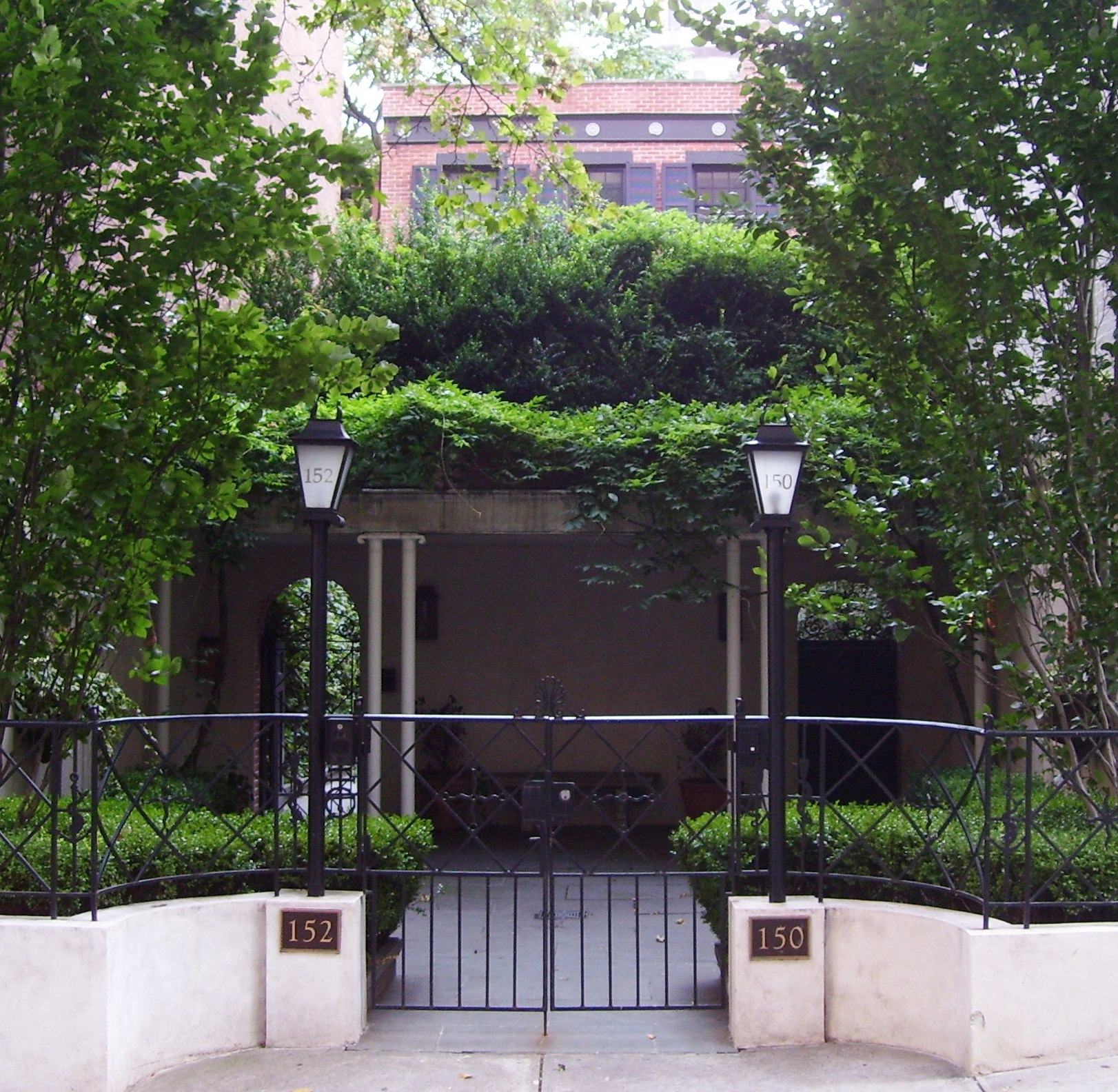
- Forecourt of 152 East 38th Street in 2012
- Interactive map of the 152 East 38th Street area

General information
- Architectural style: Federal
- Location: 152 East 38th Street; New York, NY
- Coordinates: 40°44′54″N 73°58′38″W
- Completed: 1858
- Renovated: 1934–1935

Renovating team
- Architect: Robertson Ward
- Services engineer: Alfred Offner

New York City Landmark
- Designated: May 25, 1967
- Reference no.: 579

152 East 38th Street is a historic house located between Lexington and Third avenues in the Murray Hill neighborhood of Manhattan in New York City. Constructed in 1858, the house was renovated from 1934 to 1935 and was designated a landmark in 1967 by the New York City Landmarks Preservation Commission.

== History ==
=== Development and early ownership ===
The property that the house is located on was purchased in 1855 by Patrick McCafferty as a vacant lot. McCafferty was a contractor who had also purchased the abutting lot on the north side of East 37th Street. Construction of the three-story brick house was completed in 1858. The building was unique compared to others in the neighborhood as it was situated at the rear of the lot, leaving almost 60 feet (18 m) between the front of the house and the street. McCafferty resided in the house into the 1860s and then the property was sold several times until it was acquired in 1888 by Mary L. Van Buren, the widow of James Van Buren, who had died in 1878.

Although a plaque installed by the New York Landmark Preservation Foundation outside the street entrance to the house indicates the structure "was originally a gatehouse for an estate belonging to a member of President Van Buren's family," some historians doubt this claim because the estate era in the Murray Hill neighborhood had ended by 1858 and James Van Buren was not listed as a descendent of Martin Van Buren in the 1993 book American Presidential Families written by Hugh Brogan and Charles Mosley.

=== 20th and 21st centuries ===
In 1934, engineer and antiques collector Russell Pettengill leased the house at 152 East 38th Street along with the adjacent building at No. 150 and hired architect Robertson Ward to renovate the two structures into his residence and office, respectively. Pettengill had previously experimented with having an office in his home on Sniffen Court off East 36th Street. The front yard of No. 152 was divided with a one-story wall, separating the forecourt that provides access to both buildings and screening the rear house and its front garden from the street. A glassed-in sitting room was added as an extension on the first floor of No. 152 that extends into a corner of the rear garden of No. 150. Other changes made to No. 152 included adding a rear wing with servants' rooms, deepening the cellar to provide additional storage space, and painting of the brick façade in an off-white color with gray details.

Pettengill only stayed in the newly renovated complex for a couple of years before the house at 152 East 38th Street was sold to publisher Cass Canfield, the president of Harper & Brothers. Canfield resided at the home until 1970, when he sold the property to Richard Jenrette, an investment banker who owned a collection of historic homes. The property was later acquired in 2000 by Harry V. Quadracci, the owner of Quad/Graphics, who removed the paint from the brick façade and added more landscaping to the front garden to provide additional privacy from the street.

152 East 38th Street was designated as a landmark by the New York City Landmarks Preservation Commission (LPC) on May 25, 1967. LPC had also considered including the adjacent building at 150 East 38th Street as part of the original landmark designation, but declined to take action at that time. The building was again considered for landmark designation in 2015 at a public hearing to address properties that had been under consideration prior to 2010. LPC decided to remove No. 150 from the calendar by issuing a no action letter.

== Architecture ==
The renovations made by Robertson Ward from 1934 to 1935 converted both structures from an Italianate design to the Regency Revival style and also architecturally harmonized the two buildings. Ward added a loggia with columns and wall details including blind arches and paired pilasters supporting a frieze, cornice and pediment to the forecourt, which was separated from the street by a unique iron fence decorated with anchors and drafting tools that extended in front of No. 150. Lanterns on the sides of the front gate to the forecourt depict "150" and "152" to represent the house numbers of the complex.

The front doorway to No. 152 is raised four steps from the ground and has glass side lights with delicate pilasters supporting a molded entablature and a transom; iron trellises were used in lieu of columns to support a scalloped bronze canopy covering the stoop. The front façade of the house has double-hung sash windows with black shutters and includes a frieze and a cornice crowned by a brick parapet. A formal garden was located behind No. 150, which contained a patch of grass edged with boxwood and was surrounded by pathways, shrubs and trees.

== See also ==
- List of New York City Designated Landmarks in Manhattan from 14th to 59th Streets
