= Jonathan W. Allen Stable =

Former stable in Manhattan, New York

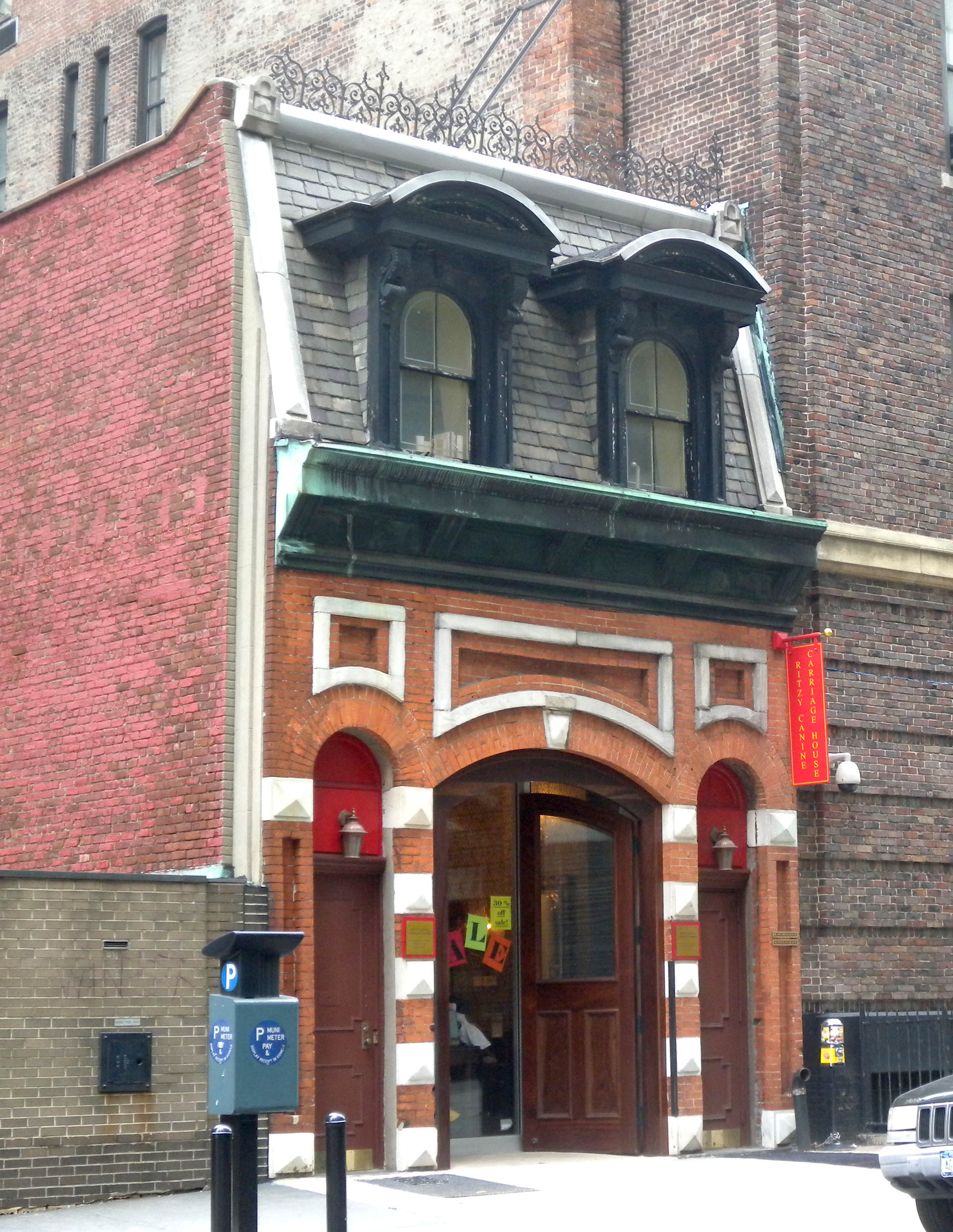
- Jonathan W. Allen Stable in 2009
- Interactive map of the Jonathan W. Allen Stable area

General information
- Architectural style: Second Empire
- Location: 148 East 40th Street; New York, NY
- Coordinates: 40°44′58.7″N 73°58′34.3″W
- Completed: 1871

Design and construction
- Main contractor: Charles E. Hadden

New York City Landmark
- Designated: June 17, 1997
- Reference no.: 1954

The Jonathan W. Allen Stable is a historic building located at 148 East 40th Street between Lexington and Third avenues in the Murray Hill neighborhood of Manhattan in New York City. Designed and built by Charles E. Hadden, the structure was originally constructed in 1871 as a private horse stable for Jonathan W. Allen. It was later converted to accommodate commercial uses and has been designated as a landmark by the New York City Landmarks Preservation Commission.

== History ==
Jonathan W. Allen was a broker who lived at 18 East 42nd Street and wanted a private stable near his residence to keep his carriages and horses. When the building was constructed in the second half of the 19th century, stables in New York City were often situated in less expensive areas to keep the noises and smells from the horses away from wealthy residents, but close enough for convenient access. At that time, the surrounding neighborhood east of Lexington Avenue consisted of factories, stables, and breweries; the particular block selected for the stable already contained other stables. Allen purchased the lot at 148 East 40th Street on February 22, 1871, and filed an application to build on the site the following month. The stable was originally projected to be a four-story building with Dorchester stone, but was instead designed as a two-story structure; the ground floor had accommodations for carriages and horses, while the second floor had living quarters for the groom.

The stable remained in the ownership of Allen and his heirs until 1919. The lot was subsequently acquired in 1924 by the New York Edison Company, which later planned to use the property and the adjacent lot at 148½ East 40th Street for an expansion of its existing electrical substation located behind the two lots on East 39th Street, a plan that was opposed by the Murray Hill Association and taken to court. In 1937, the electric utility company—since renamed Consolidated Edison—rented out the former stable to sculptor John E. Flannigan, who used the ground floor as a studio and the second floor as an apartment. From 1946 onward, the second floor was used as office space, while the ground floor was used as storage.

The building was designated as a landmark by the New York City Landmarks Preservation Commission in 1997. In the beginning of the 21st century, the building was the home of the Ritzy Canine Carriage House, a luxury pet sitter for cats and dogs. As of 2023, the building was undergoing renovations and listed for lease.

== Architecture ==
The façade consists of brick with accents of white stone and is divided into three bays of doorways at ground level. The center bay features double doors and originally served as the carriage entrance, while the outer bays are narrower doorways, one of which led to the living quarters above. Both of the outer openings contain wood-paneled doors below a transom window and the center double doors have wood paneling with windows in the upper half. All three openings are arched and topped with incised brick panels bordered by stone blocks; the center arch contains a keystone. Pilasters between the center and outer doors have alternating panels of brick and stone while the pilasters on the outside of the narrow doors contain incised brick panels between white stone blocks. An iron cornice is located above the ground floor. The top of the building facing the street incorporates designs of the Second Empire style, including a slate mansard roof with pedimented dormers, and is crowned with iron cresting. Stone strips are located on each side of the roof and are topped by a stone finial.

== See also ==
- List of New York City Designated Landmarks in Manhattan from 14th to 59th Streets
