= Scheffel Hall =

Commercial building in Manhattan, New York

Coordinates: 40°44′08″N 73°59′09″W

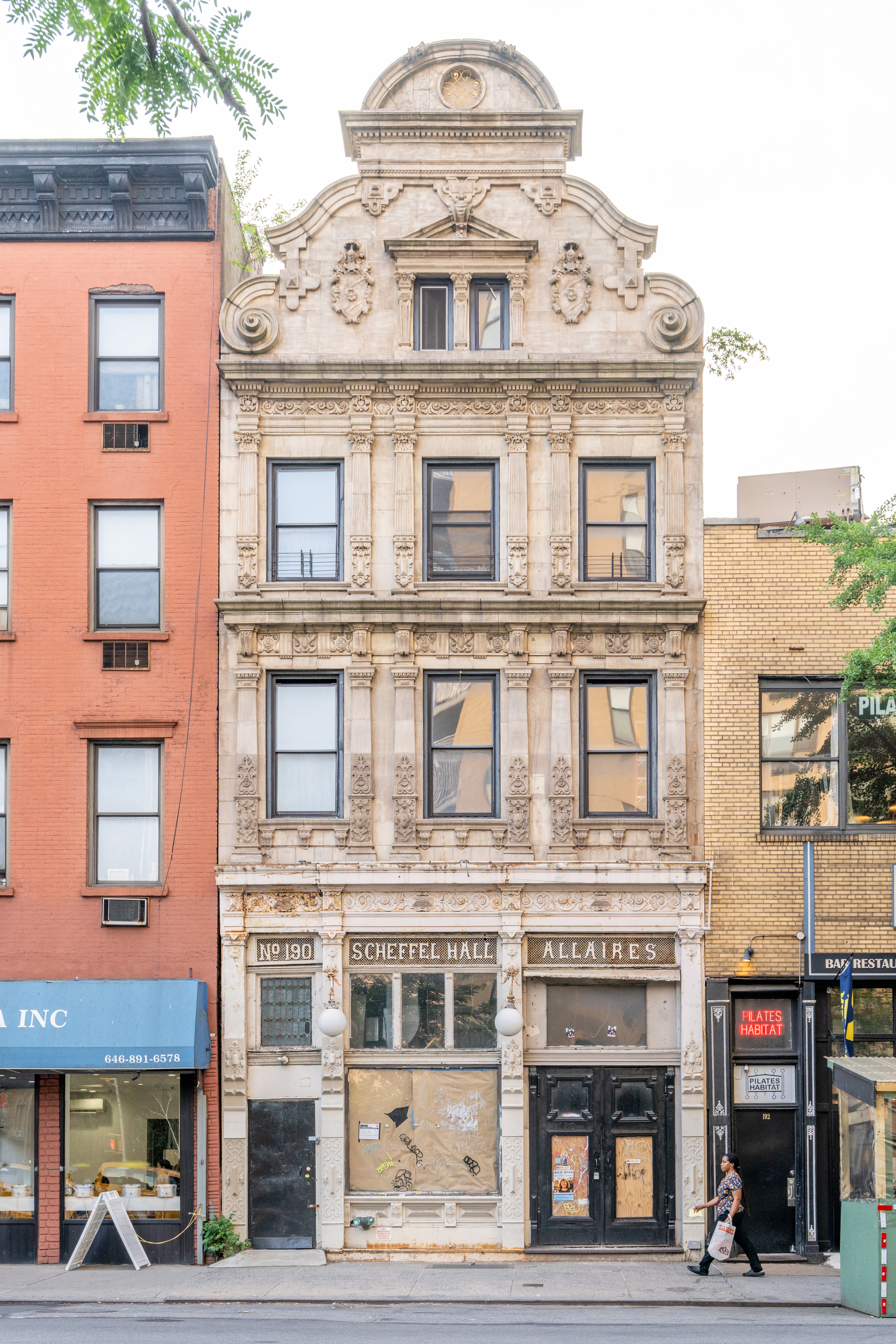
Scheffel Hall (2025)

Scheffel Hall at 190 Third Avenue in the Gramercy Park neighborhood of Manhattan, New York City, was built in 1894–1895, and designed by Henry Adams Weber and Hubert Drosser, at a time when the area south of it was known as Kleindeutschland ("Little Germany") due to the large number of German immigrants who lived nearby. The building, which served as a beer hall and restaurant, was modeled after an early 17th-century building in Heidelberg Castle, the "Friedrichsbau", and was named after Joseph Viktor von Scheffel, a German poet and novelist. It later became known as Allaire's, a name still inscribed on the building. The building's style has been described as "German-American eclectic Renaissance Revival".

Later, in the late 1920s, the building was used by the German-American Athletic Club. By 1939 it became the German-American Rathskeller, and then Joe King's Rathskeller. O. Henry used Scheffel Hall as the setting for "The Halberdier of the Little Rheinschloss" and wrote some of his stories there. Beginning in the 1970s, it was the home of Fat Tuesday's, a well-known jazz club, and the restaurant Tuesday's, which lasted until the early 21st century. In subsequent years it was a yoga and pilates studio and today is unoccupied.

Scheffel Hall was designated a New York City landmark in 1997.

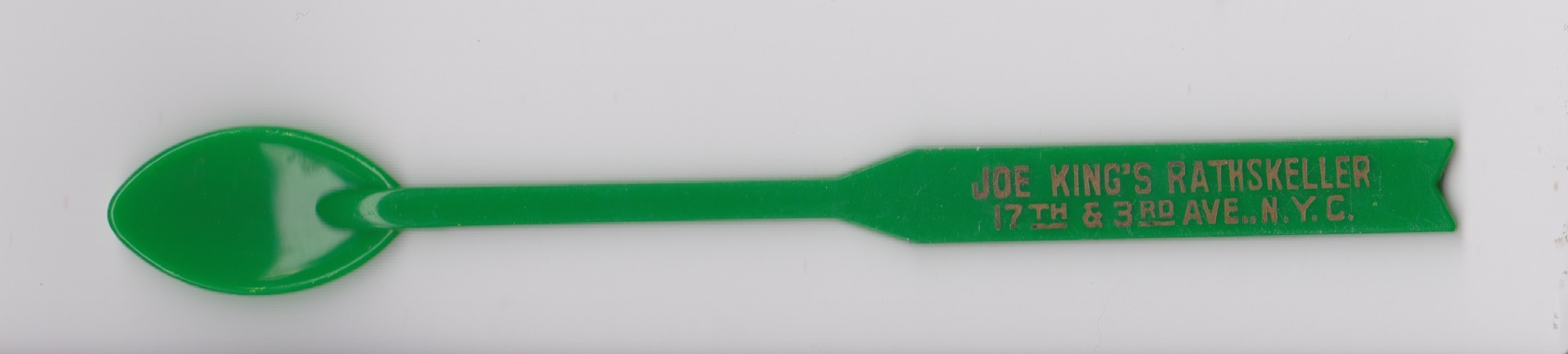
Plastic stir-stick from Joe King's Rathskeller, circa 1966.

== See also ==
- List of New York City Designated Landmarks in Manhattan from 14th to 59th Streets
- National Register of Historic Places listings in Manhattan from 14th to 59th Streets
