= Rooftop water tower =

Water tower on the roof of a tall building

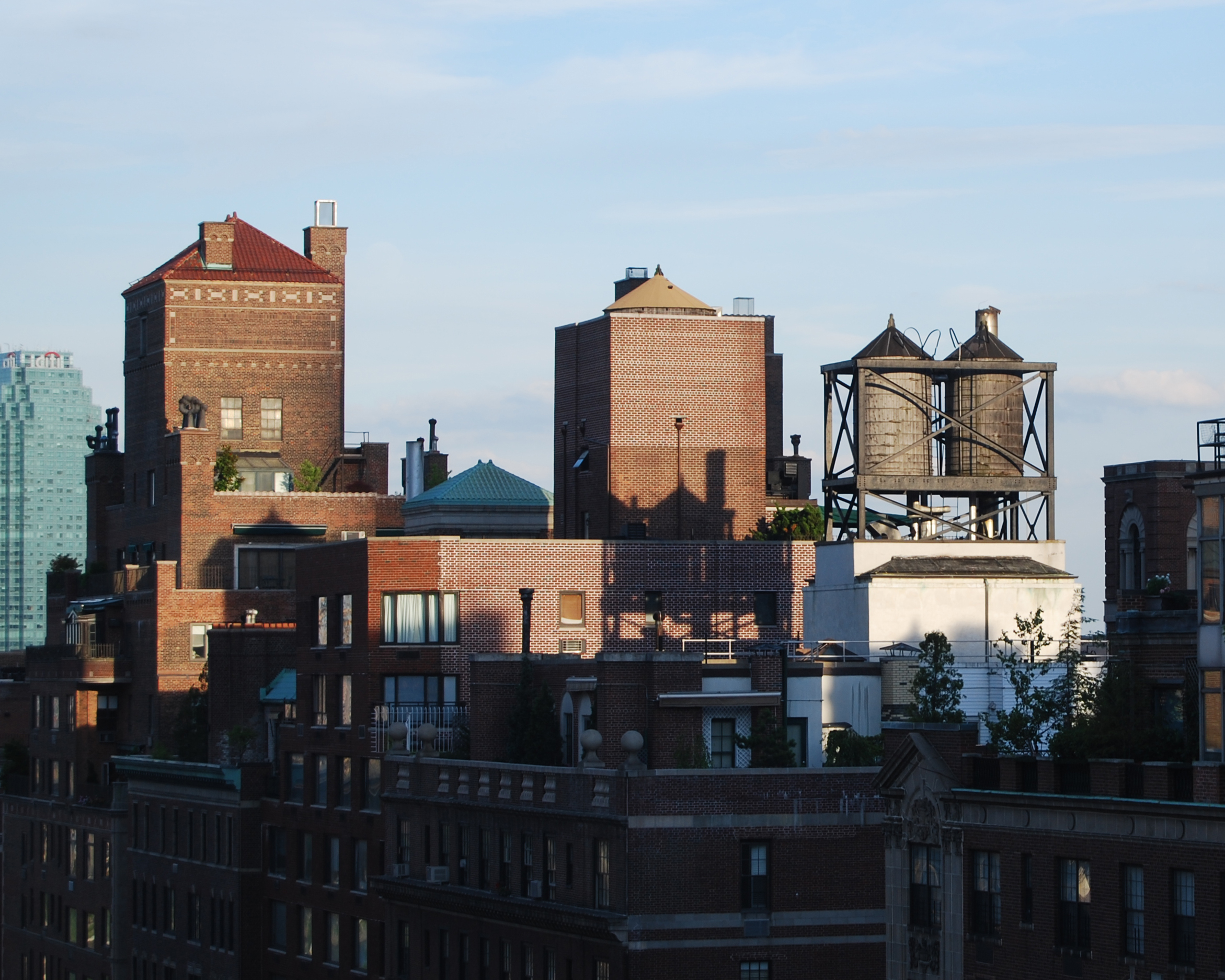
Rooftop water towers atop apartment buildings on East 57th Street in New York City showing differing kinds of tank

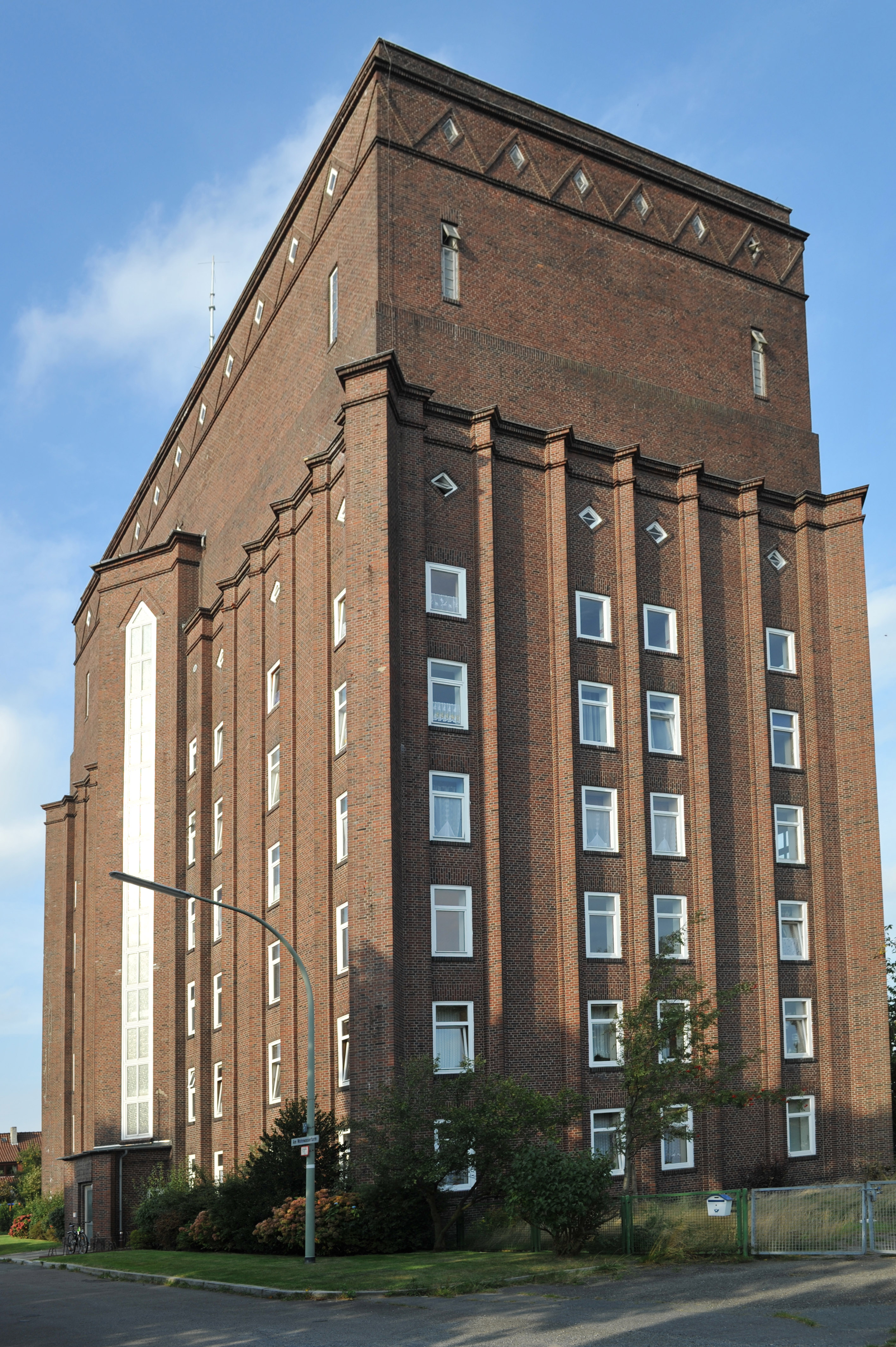
A highrise residential building with integrated water tank in Bremerhaven, Germany

A rooftop water tower is a variant of a water tower, consisting of a water container placed on the roof of a tall building.

This structure supplies water pressure to floors at higher elevation than public water towers.

As building height increases, the vertical height of its plumbing also increases. This produces a large water column and the weight of this water produces very high pressure at the bottom of the column. Normally, this would require very thick (heavy-duty) plumbing to survive the pressure. Fittings at the bottom of the column would need pressure reducing valves to operate normally, and municipal water pressure would need to be very high to supply pressure to the top of the column.

Instead, the plumbing at various levels of the building are often sequestered, with pressure supplied from a rooftop water tower instead of the municipal supply. The tower itself is fed by a pump and a relatively high pressure line that carries water to the top of the building from the pipes below.

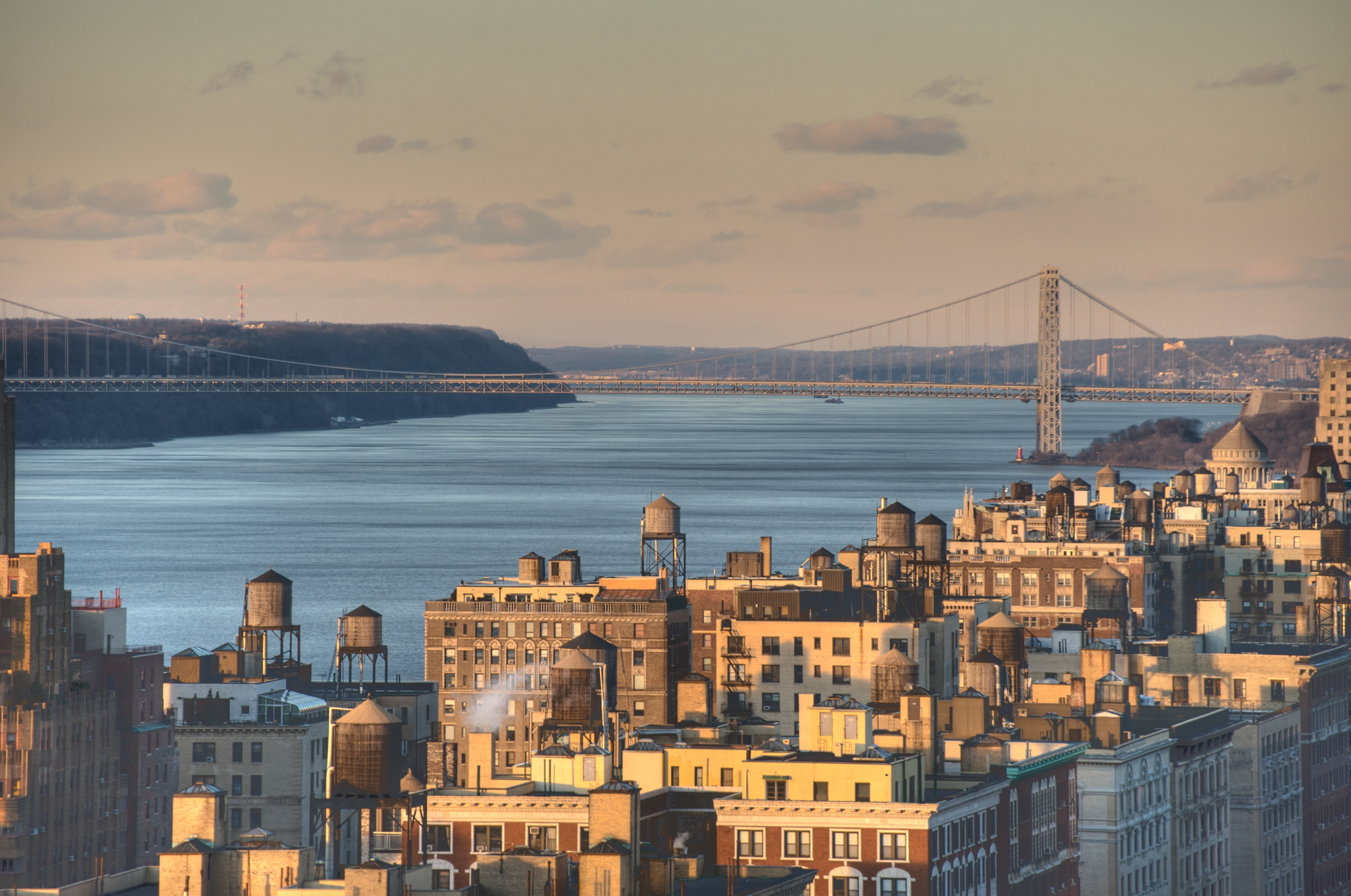
Wooden water towers on rooftops in New York City

Alternatively, buildings may house water tanks within their structure. The tanks of such buildings usually do not serve only for keeping water pressure in higher floors, but often also for the public water supply.

== Maintenance ==
Regular cleaning of tanks in use is necessary, in order to prevent possible water contamination. Cleaning a water tank usually takes about six hours depending on the size of the tank. Most tanks in New York City are around 12 ft high and similar in diameter. This process includes scraping away the sediment and any debris that the tank has accumulated, then the interior surfaces are cleaned with a chlorine solution. Routine inspection for holes and cracks is also necessary, to prevent the intrusion of contaminants. Any holes are calked with epoxy and the metal hoops used to secure the walls of the tank are tightened to spec.

In 2009, New York City passed new laws forcing property owners to have their tanks inspected annually, with proof of inspection. Inspection reports must also be available to all tenants in the building. If any unsatisfactory results are found, the individual responsible for the building must immediately have the tank cleaned up to city safety standards. Failure to comply with these rules can lead to the imposition of fines on the property owner.

== See also ==
- Water tower – Elevated structure supporting a tank
- Water tank – Container for storing water
