= Cantilevered stairs =

Stairs that appear to float

Cantilevered stairs, façade of Surb Astvatsatsin Church, Armenia

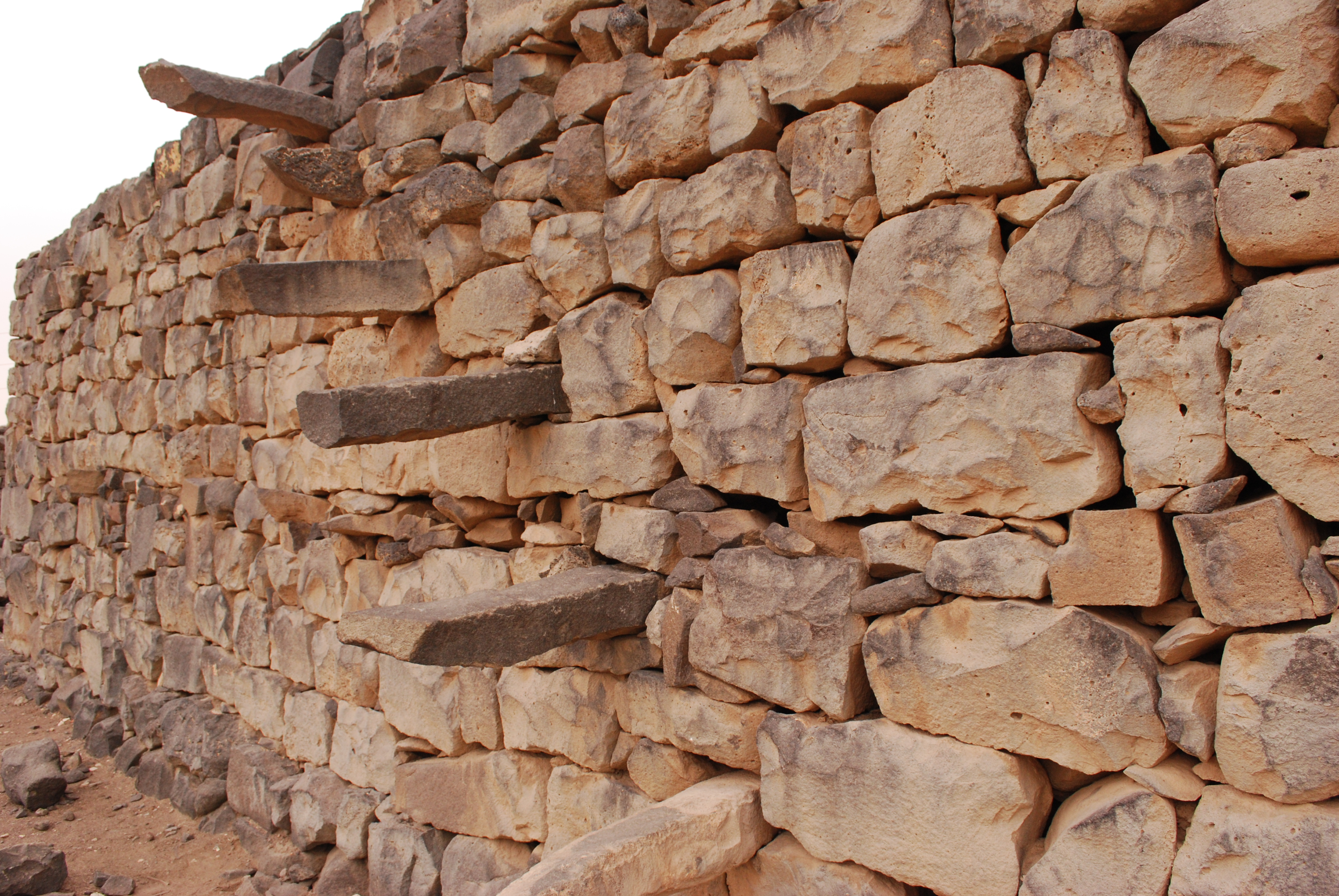

Cantilevered stairs in Qasr Azraq

Cantilevered stairs, or floating stairs, are a type of staircase.

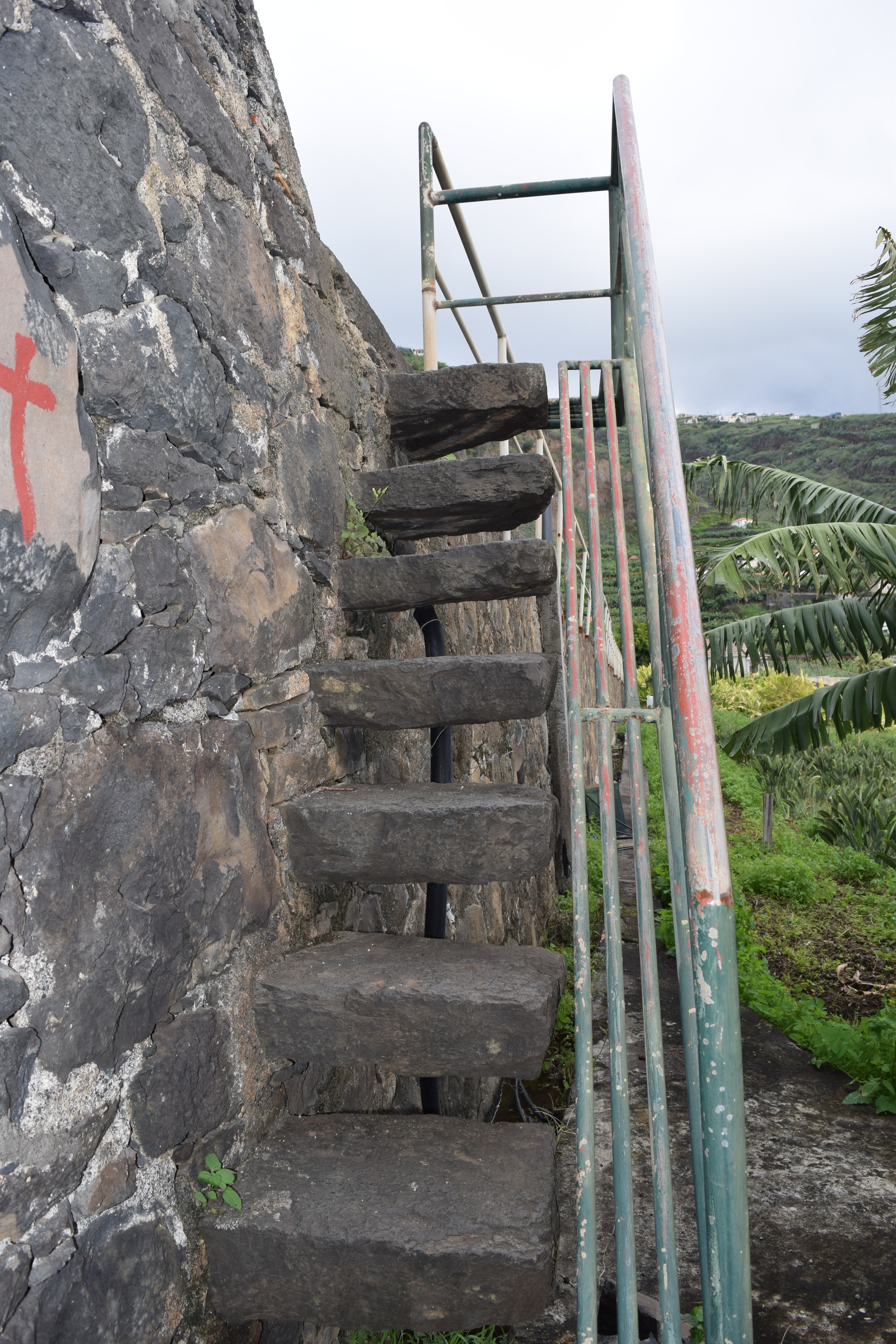
A metal safety rail has been added to the outside of this cantilevered stone staircase.

A cantilever is a beam which is anchored at only one end. Thus cantilevered stairs have a "floating" appearance, and they may be composed of different materials, such as wood, glass, stone, or stainless steel.

== History ==
In "I quattro libri dell'architettura", Andrea Palladio commended staircases that are "void in the middle, because they can have the light from above" and because it is visible whether someone is already ascending or descending the stairs.

Inigo Jones and Nicholas Stone used the technique in the Tulip Staircase at Queen's House. Such stairs became common in the 18th and 19th centuries in Scotland, where they were known as "pencheck" stairs, used in Edinburgh townhouses and tenements, as well as in stately homes by Robert Adam.

== External links and references ==
- On installation of cantilever stairs
- International codes, relating to their construction
- Statistics on cantilever stairs
- What are floating stairs?
