= Third Avenue =

North-south avenue in New York City

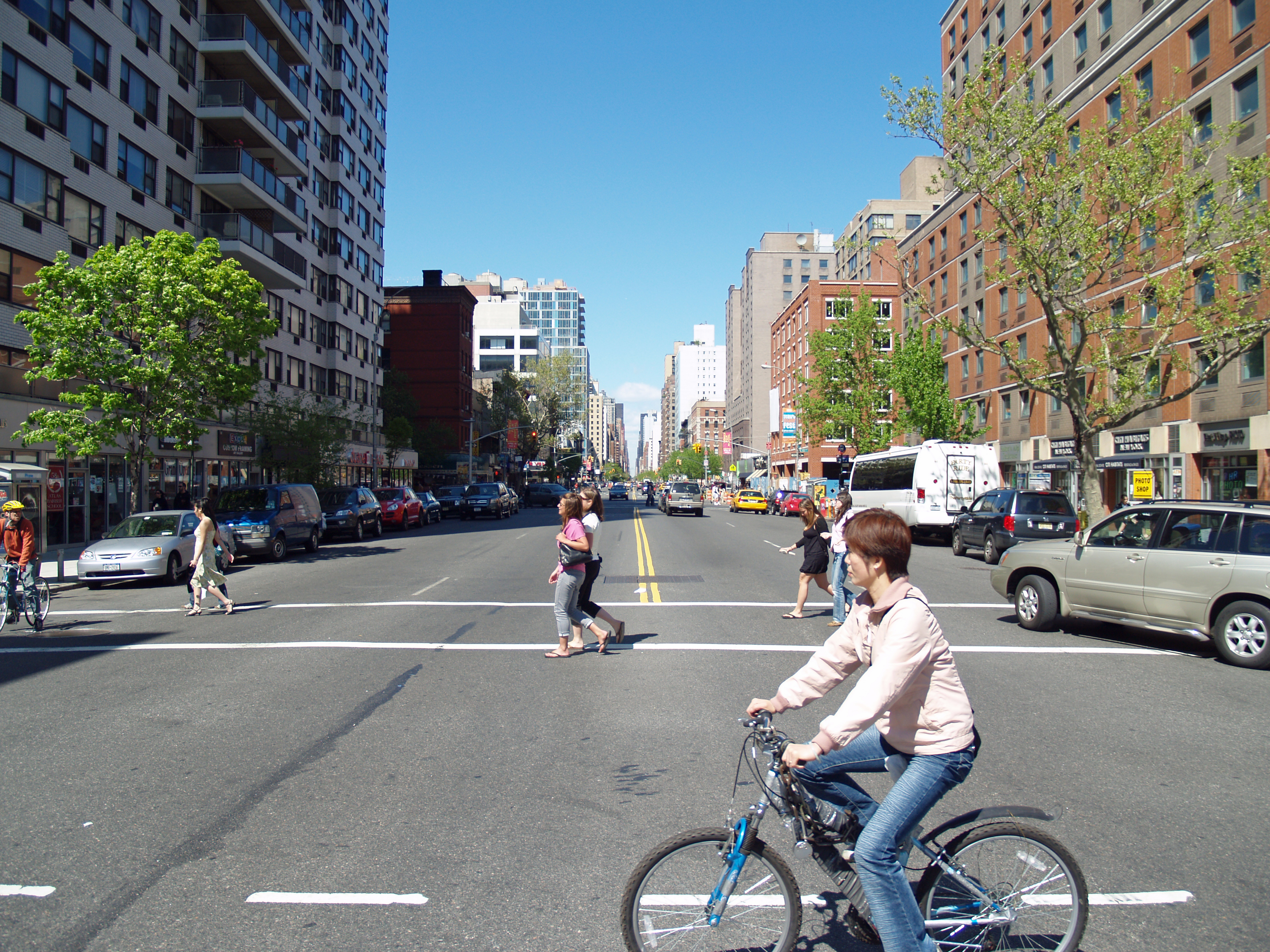
- Looking north from 9th Street in 2007
- Bronx portion
- Owner: City of New York
- Maintained by: NYCDOT
- Length: 10.7 mi (17.2 km)
- Location: Manhattan and the Bronx in New York City
- Coordinates: 40°48′27″N 73°55′57″W
- South end: Astor Place / St. Mark's Place in Cooper Square
- Major junctions: FDR Drive in East Harlem; I-87 in Mott Haven; I-95 in Morrisania/Tremont
- North end: US 1 in Fordham
- East: Second Avenue (128th Street and south) Lincoln Avenue (Bruckner Boulevard to 138th Street) Alexander Avenue (138th Street to 143rd Street) Willis Avenue (143rd Street to 148th Street) Bergen Avenue (148th Street to 154th Street) Brook Avenue (154th Street to 161st Street)
- West: Fourth Avenue (between 8th and 14th Streets); Irving Place (between 14th and 20th Streets; Lexington Avenue (north of 21st Street)

Construction
- Commissioned: March 1811

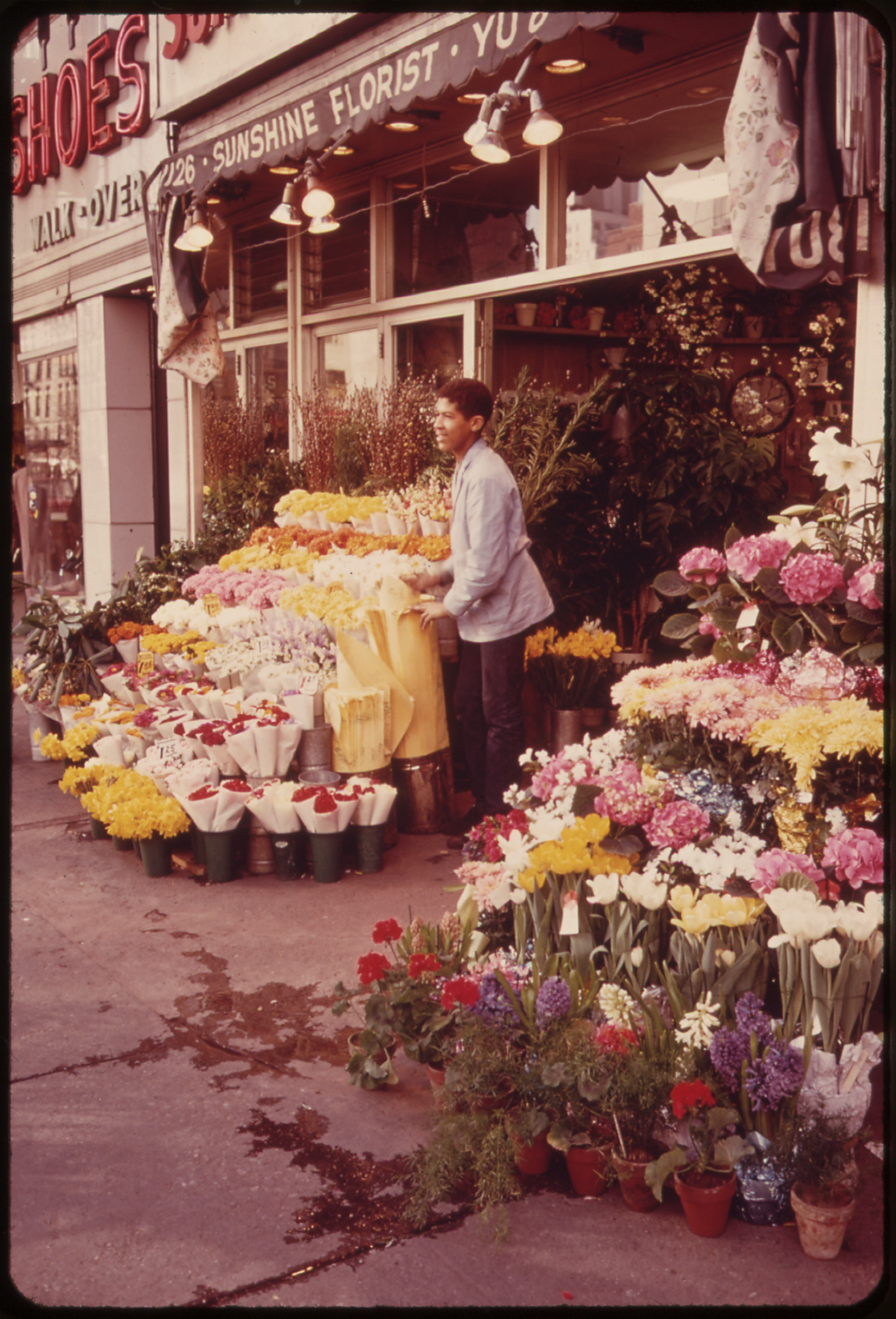
A Third Avenue flower shop in the 1970s

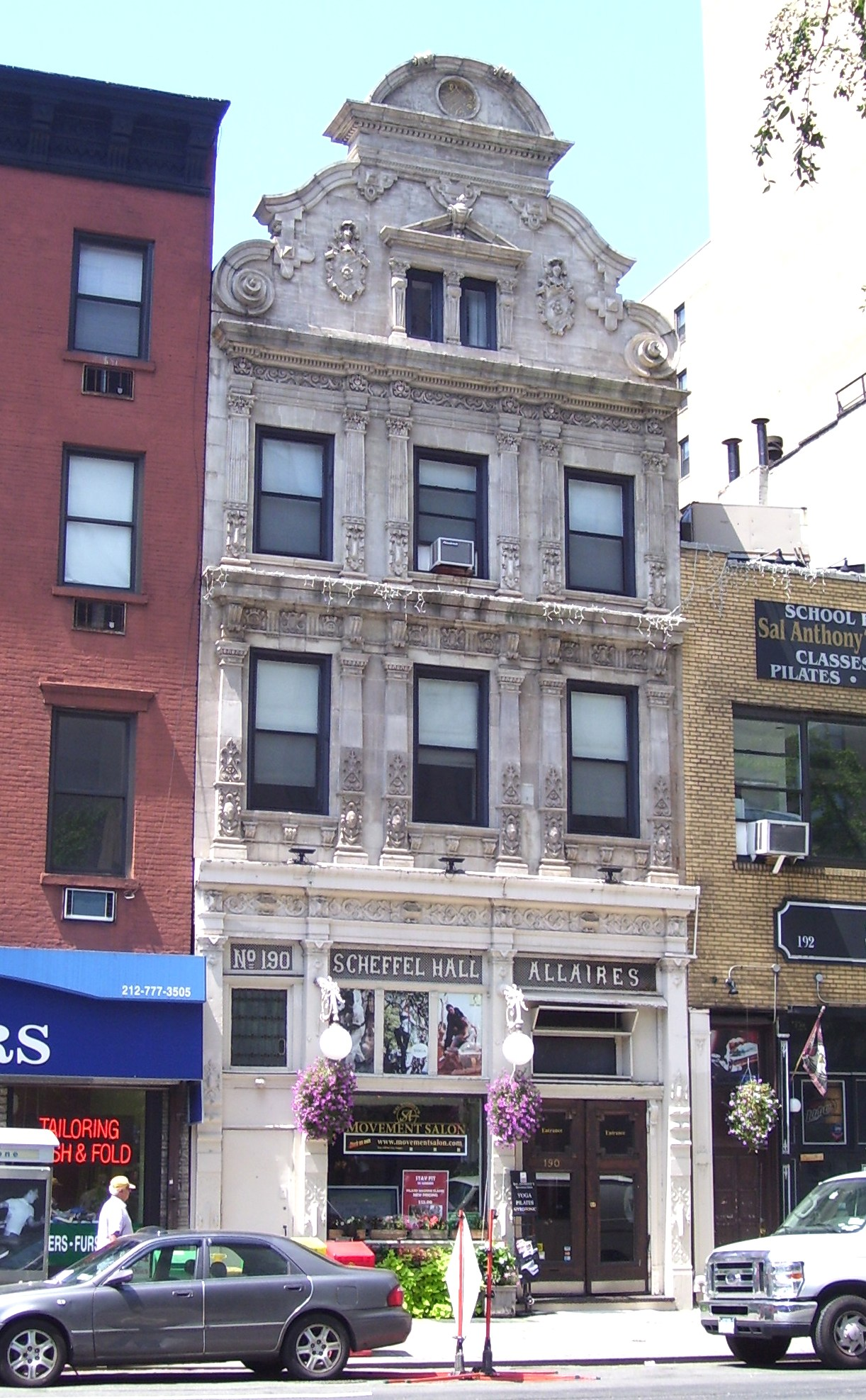
Scheffel Hall (1895) is a remnant of the time when Kleindeutschland extended up Third Avenue as far as East 17th Street

Third Avenue is a north-south thoroughfare on the East Side of the New York City borough of Manhattan, as well as in the center portion of the Bronx. Its southern end is at Astor Place and St. Mark's Place. It transitions into Cooper Square, and further south, the Bowery, Chatham Square, and Park Row. The Manhattan side ends at East 128th Street. Third Avenue is two-way from Cooper Square to 24th Street, but carries only northbound (uptown) traffic while in Manhattan above 24th Street; in the Bronx, it is again two-way. However, the Third Avenue Bridge carries vehicular traffic in the opposite direction, allowing only southbound vehicular traffic, rendering the avenue essentially non-continuous to motor vehicles between the boroughs.

The street leaves Manhattan and continues into the Bronx across the Harlem River over the Third Avenue Bridge north of East 129th Street to East Fordham Road at Fordham Center, where it intersects with U.S. 1. It is one of the four streets that form The Hub, a site of both maximum traffic and architectural density in the South Bronx.

== History ==
Third Avenue was unpaved like most urban streets until the late 19th century. In May 1861, according to a letter to the editor of The New York Times, the street was the scene of practice marching for the poorly equipped troops in the 7th New York Volunteer Infantry Regiment: "The men were not in uniform, but very poorly dressed, — in many cases with flip-flap shoes. The business-like air with which they marched rapidly through the deep mud of Third Avenue was the more remarkable."

On July 17, 1960, the section of Third Avenue in Manhattan north of 24th Street was converted into a one-way road.

Starting in July 2023, a bus lane and a protected bike lane were installed on Third Avenue between 59th and 96th Streets, and that section of the avenue was narrowed from five to three vehicular travel lanes. A double-width, 11-foot-wide (3.4 m) bike lane was added between 64th and 66th Streets, and between 80th and 82nd Streets, where the avenue slopes uphill. To improve safety, traffic signals along the length of the bike lane were also retimed, allowing cyclists to pass through a "green wave" of traffic lights if they traveled at 15 miles per hour (24 km/h).

== Public transportation ==
=== Buses ===
In Manhattan, Third Avenue is covered by the Third and Lexington (or Amsterdam) Avenues buses, which are the M103, running it south of East 126th Street but terminating at East 125th Street, and the M101 and M102, running it from Astor Place to Dr. Martin Luther King Jr. Boulevard and East 116th Street, respectively. The M98 Limited also joins in north of East 65th Street, originates service at East 67th Street, and continues until East 127th Street. Where Third Avenue is one-way uptown, downtown buses use the parallel Lexington Avenue.

Several bus routes also run on Third Avenue in the Bronx:

- At East 138th Street, the Mott Haven–bound Bx1 terminates, then runs out of service to Lincoln Avenue, changing direction to Riverdale.
- The Bx2 runs between East 138th Street and either East 149th Street (Kingsbridge Heights) or Courtlandt Avenue (Mott Haven).
- The Bx15 runs between Westchester Avenue and East Fordham Road. Fordham Plaza service begins at East 148th Street out of service.
- The Bx21 runs to/from Boston Road with the Bx32 south of East 139th Street. Both head either to East 136th Street (Mott Haven), or from East 138th Street (opposite terminals).
- The Williamsbridge-bound Bx41 local & Select Bus Service run from East 148th to East 150th Streets.

The Manhattanville-bound M125 runs on three portions: from Westchester to Willis Avenues, from East 138th to East 137th Streets, and from Lincoln Avenue in the Bronx to East 128th Street in Manhattan, via the Third Avenue Bridge.

=== Subway ===
Third Avenue was the location of the Third Avenue Railroad, a horsecar line established in 1853 that evolved into one of the most extensive streetcar systems in Manhattan, the Bronx, and Westchester County. Later, it was served by the Third Avenue elevated line, which operated from 1878 until 1955 in Manhattan and 1973 in the Bronx. The Bx55 replaced the Third Avenue Line in the Bronx in 1973. When the El was being torn down in Manhattan, there was a movement to rename the whole of Third Avenue in Manhattan "the Bouwerie" (but not the portion in the Bronx). However, it had never been part of the Bowery. Today, the Third Avenue – 149th Street station (2 and 5 trains) and Third Avenue – 138th Street station (6 and <6> trains) are served by the New York City Subway.

In Manhattan, several crosstown subway routes have entrances on Third Avenue:

- M and Q trains: Lexington Avenue–63rd Street station
- N, R, and W trains: Lexington Avenue–59th Street station
- E, F, and <F> trains: Lexington Avenue–53rd Street station
- L train: Third Avenue station

== See also ==
- Second Avenue
- Lexington Avenue
