= Turtle Bay, Manhattan =

Turtle Bay
- Neighborhood of Manhattan
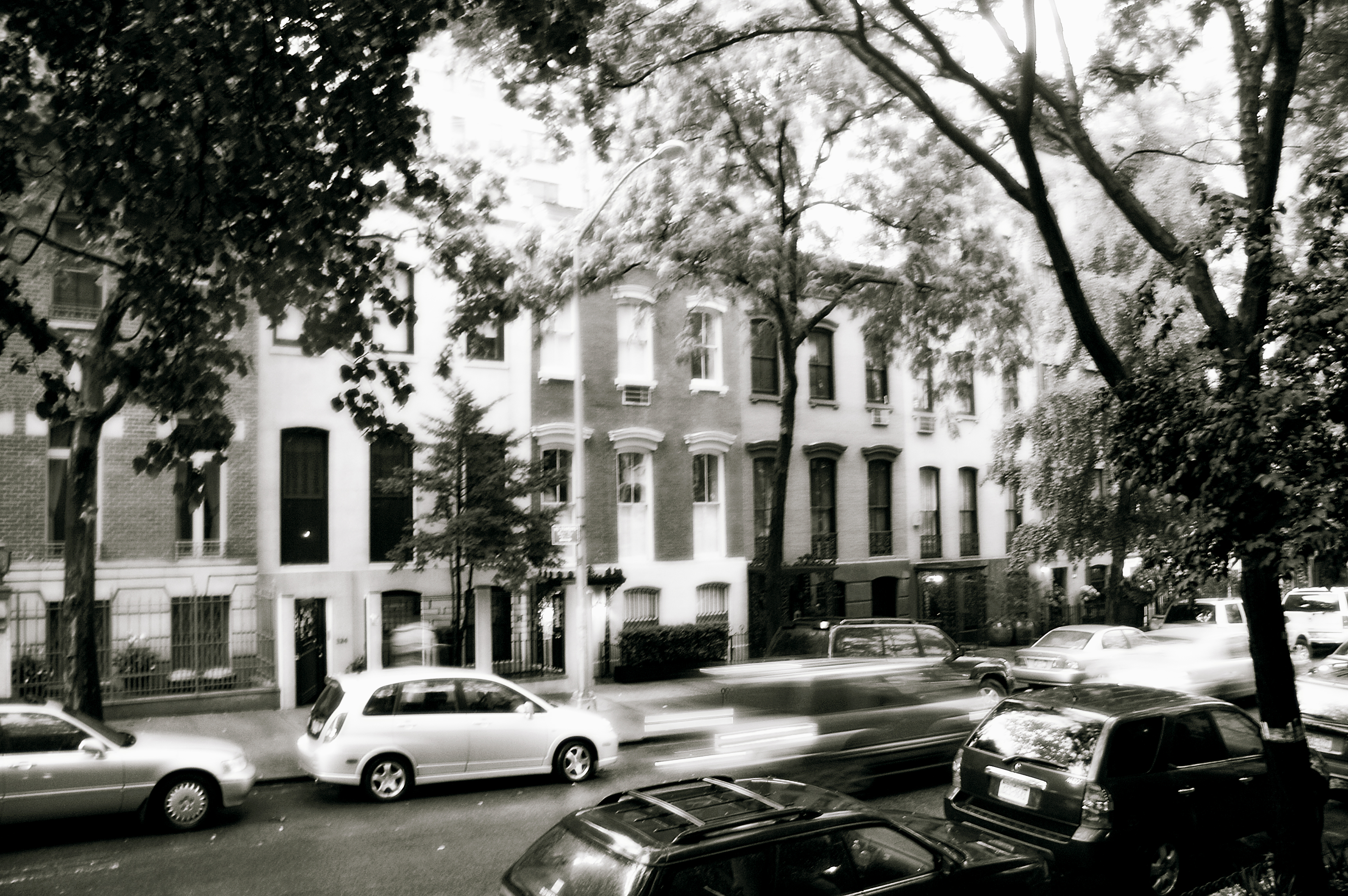
- Townhouses in Turtle Bay in June 2006
- Location of Turtle Bay in New York City
- Coordinates: 40.756°N 73.970°W
- Country: United States
- State: New York
- City: New York City
- Borough: Manhattan
- Community District: Manhattan 6

Area
  - Total: 0.403 sq mi (1.04 km^{2})

Population (2016)
  - Total: 24,856
  - Density: 61,700/sq mi (23,800/km^{2})

Ethnicity
  - White: 77.1%
  - Asian: 13.0%
  - Hispanic: 5.8%
  - Black: 2.1%
  - Other: 0.4%

Economics
  - Median income: $135,360
- Time zone: UTC−5 (Eastern)
  - Summer (DST): UTC−4 (EDT)
- ZIP Codes: 10017, 10022
- Area code: 212, 332, 646, and 917

Turtle Bay is a neighborhood in New York City, on the east side of Midtown Manhattan. It extends from roughly 43rd Street to 53rd Street, and eastward from Lexington Avenue to the East River's western branch (facing Roosevelt Island). The neighborhood is the site of the headquarters of the United Nations and the Chrysler Building. The Tudor City apartment complex is next to the southeast corner of Turtle Bay.

Turtle Bay is named after a former cove of the East River. The neighborhood was originally settled as a Dutch farm in the 17th century, and was subsequently developed with tenements, power plants, and slaughterhouses in the 19th century. These industrial structures were largely demolished in the 1940s and 1950s to make way for the United Nations headquarters. Today, Turtle Bay contains multiple missions and consulates to the nearby United Nations headquarters.

Turtle Bay is part of Manhattan Community District 6, and its primary ZIP Codes are 10017 and 10022. It is patrolled by the 17th Precinct of the New York City Police Department.

== History ==
=== Colonial days ===
Turtle Bay, a cove of the East River, was between what is now 45th and 48th Streets and was fed by a stream that ran from the present-day intersection of Second Avenue and 48th Street. It was probably named after the turtles found in the area. Historical records from the 17th century described an abundance of turtles nearby, with local residents partaking in a "turtle feast".

The Turtle Bay neighborhood was originally a 40-acre (16 ha) land grant given to two Englishmen by the Dutch colonial governor of New Amsterdam in 1639 and named "Turtle Bay Farm". The farm extended roughly from what is now 40th to 49th Streets and from Third Avenue to the river. By 1712, "Turtle Bay" was frequently used in property documents for the area.

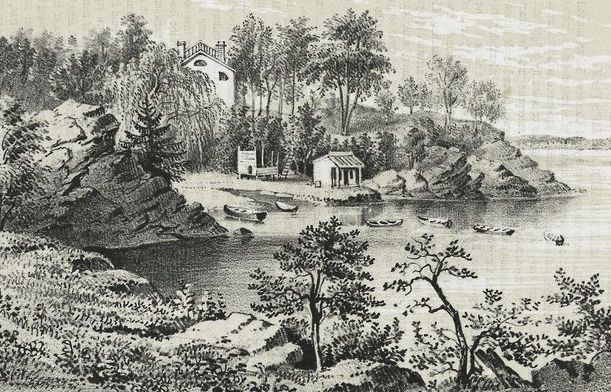
1853 depiction of Turtle Bay

On a knoll overlooking the cove, near 41st Street, the farmhouse was purchased as a summer retreat by Francis Bayard, and in the early 19th century remained the summer villa of Francis Bayard Winthrop. Turtle Creek, or DeVoor's Mill Creek as it was known, emptied into the cove at what is now 47th Street. To the south lay Kip's Bay farm; to the north, on a bluff, stood James Beekman's "Mount Pleasant", the first of a series of houses and villas with water views stretching away up the shoreline. After the street grid system was initiated in Manhattan, the hilly landscape of the Turtle Bay Farm was graded to create cross-streets and the land was subdivided for residential development.

=== Late 19th century ===
An army enrollment office was established at Third Avenue and 46th Street, after the first Draft Act was passed during the American Civil War. On July 13, 1863, an angry mob burned the office to the ground and proceeded to riot through the surrounding neighborhood, destroying entire blocks. The New York Draft Riots continued for three days before army troops managed to contain the mob, which had burned and looted much of the city. The cove was filled in after the Civil War, serving as a valuable shelter from the often harsh weather on the river, and became a thriving site for shipbuilding.

After the war ended, the formerly pastoral neighborhood was developed with brownstones. By 1868 the bay had been entirely filled in by commercial overdevelopment, packed with breweries, gasworks, slaughterhouses, cattle pens, coal yards, and railroad piers. By the early 20th century, Turtle Bay was "a riverside back yard" for the city, as the WPA Guide to New York City (1939) described it: "huge industrial enterprises—breweries, laundries, abattoirs, power plants—along the water front face squalid tenements not far away from new apartment dwellings attracted to the section by its river view and its central position. The numerous plants shower this district with the heaviest sootfall in the city—150 tons to the square mile annually".

The huge Waterside Station, a power plant operated by the Consolidated Edison Company, producing 367,000 kilowatts of electricity in its coal-fired plant, marked the southern boundary of the neighborhood. There were also 18 acres (7.3 ha) of slaughterhouses along First Avenue. With an infusion of poor immigrants having had come in the later part of the 19th century, and the opening of the elevated train lines along Second and Third Avenues, the neighborhood went into decay with crumbling tenement buildings.

=== 20th and 21st centuries ===
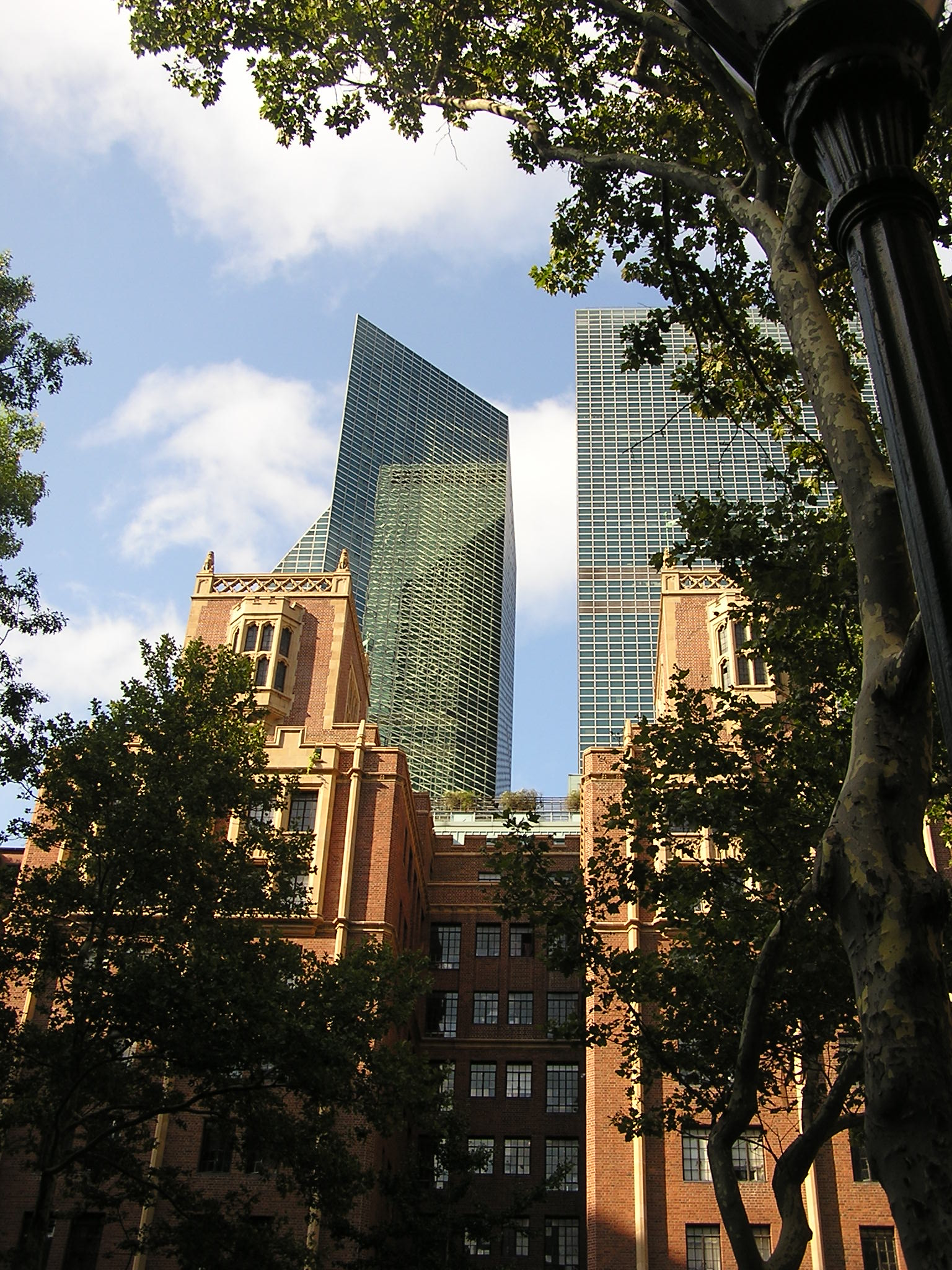
Tudor City is at Turtle Bay's southern edge

Many tenements were restored in the 1920s, and a large communal garden was established. Charlotte Hunnewell Sorchan saw promise in the run-down rowhouses of Turtle Bay. In 1918 she purchased twenty houses on 48th and 49th Streets between Second and Third Avenues; within two years she had renovated the enclave called Turtle Bay Gardens. An area between First and Second Avenues, and 41st and 43rd Streets was known as "Goat Hill"—goats and squatters ruled the area—and later renamed "Prospect Hill". Prospect Hill developed into a shanty Irish community known as "Corcoran's Roost", founded by Jimmy Corcoran, in the 1850s, and later became known as a community with a high rate of violent crime and a haven for waterfront thieves such as the Rag Gang, during the late 19th century. From 1927 to 1932, the 2,800-unit Tudor City was built on this site, which was in 1988 named a historic district.

The clearing of the slaughterhouses for the construction of the UN headquarters in 1948, largely completed by 1952, and the removal of the elevated trains opened the neighborhood up for high-rise office buildings and condominiums. Concurrent with the UN headquarters' construction, the Ralph Bunche Park staircase was constructed, connecting Tudor City to the rest of Turtle Bay. Until the Third Avenue El was demolished in 1956, it was characterized by a blighted stretch of sooty darkness that had separated the neighborhood from Midtown Manhattan.

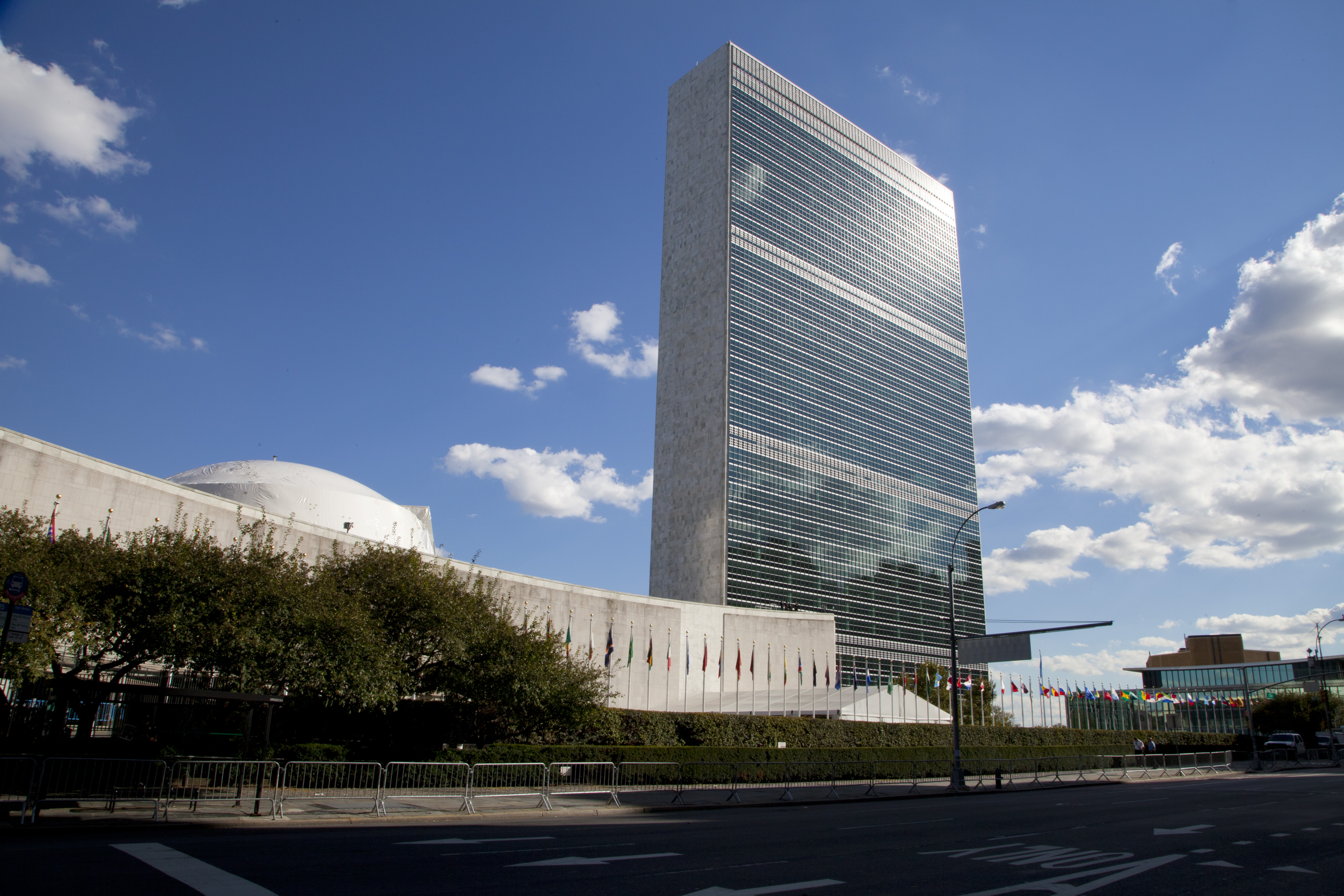
The United Nations Headquarters is located in Turtle Bay; pictured is the United Nations General Assembly Building and the United Nations Secretariat Building.

After the UN headquarters' expansion plan was originally announced in 2000, it was opposed by some Turtle Bay residents over concerns about the loss of the current Robert Moses Playground in order to build a long-sought new UN building on the site. In October 2011, city and state officials announced an agreement in which the UN would be allowed to build the tower adjacent to the existing campus on the current playground. In exchange, the United Nations would allow the construction of an esplanade along the East River that would complete the East River Greenway, a waterfront pedestrian and bicycle pathway. While host nation authorities have agreed to the provisions of the plan, it needs the approval of the United Nations in order to be implemented. The plan is similar in concept to an earlier proposal that had been announced in 2000 but did not move forward.

== Demographics ==
For census purposes, the New York City government classifies Turtle Bay as part of a larger neighborhood tabulation area called Turtle Bay-East Midtown. Based on data from the 2010 United States census, the population of Turtle Bay-East Midtown was 51,231, a change of 1,494 (2.9%) from the 49,737 counted in 2000. Covering an area of 410.95 acres (166.31 ha), the neighborhood had a population density of 124.7 inhabitants per acre (79,800/sq mi; 30,800/km^{2}). The racial makeup of the neighborhood was 77.1% (39,475) White, 2.1% (1,071) African American, 0% (23) Native American, 13% (6,655) Asian, 0% (21) Pacific Islander, 0.4% (184) from other races, and 1.6% (845) from two or more races. Hispanic or Latino of any race were 5.8% (2,957) of the population.

The entirety of Community District 6, which comprises Turtle Bay and Stuyvesant Town, had 53,120 inhabitants as of NYC Health's 2018 Community Health Profile, with an average life expectancy of 84.8 years. This is higher than the median life expectancy of 81.2 for all New York City neighborhoods. Most inhabitants are adults: a plurality (45%) are between the ages of 25–44, while 22% are between 45 and 64, and 13% are 65 or older. The ratio of youth and college-aged residents was lower, at 7% and 12% respectively.

As of 2017, the median household income in Community District 6 was $112,383, though the median income in Turtle Bay individually was $135,360 In 2018, an estimated 10% of Turtle Bay and Stuyvesant Town residents lived in poverty, compared to 14% in all of Manhattan and 20% in all of New York City. One in twenty-five residents (4%) were unemployed, compared to 7% in Manhattan and 9% in New York City. Rent burden, or the percentage of residents who have difficulty paying their rent, is 42% in Turtle Bay and Stuyvesant Town, compared to the boroughwide and citywide rates of 45% and 51% respectively. Based on this calculation, as of 2018, Turtle Bay and Stuyvesant Town are considered to be high-income relative to the rest of the city and not gentrifying.

== Community ==
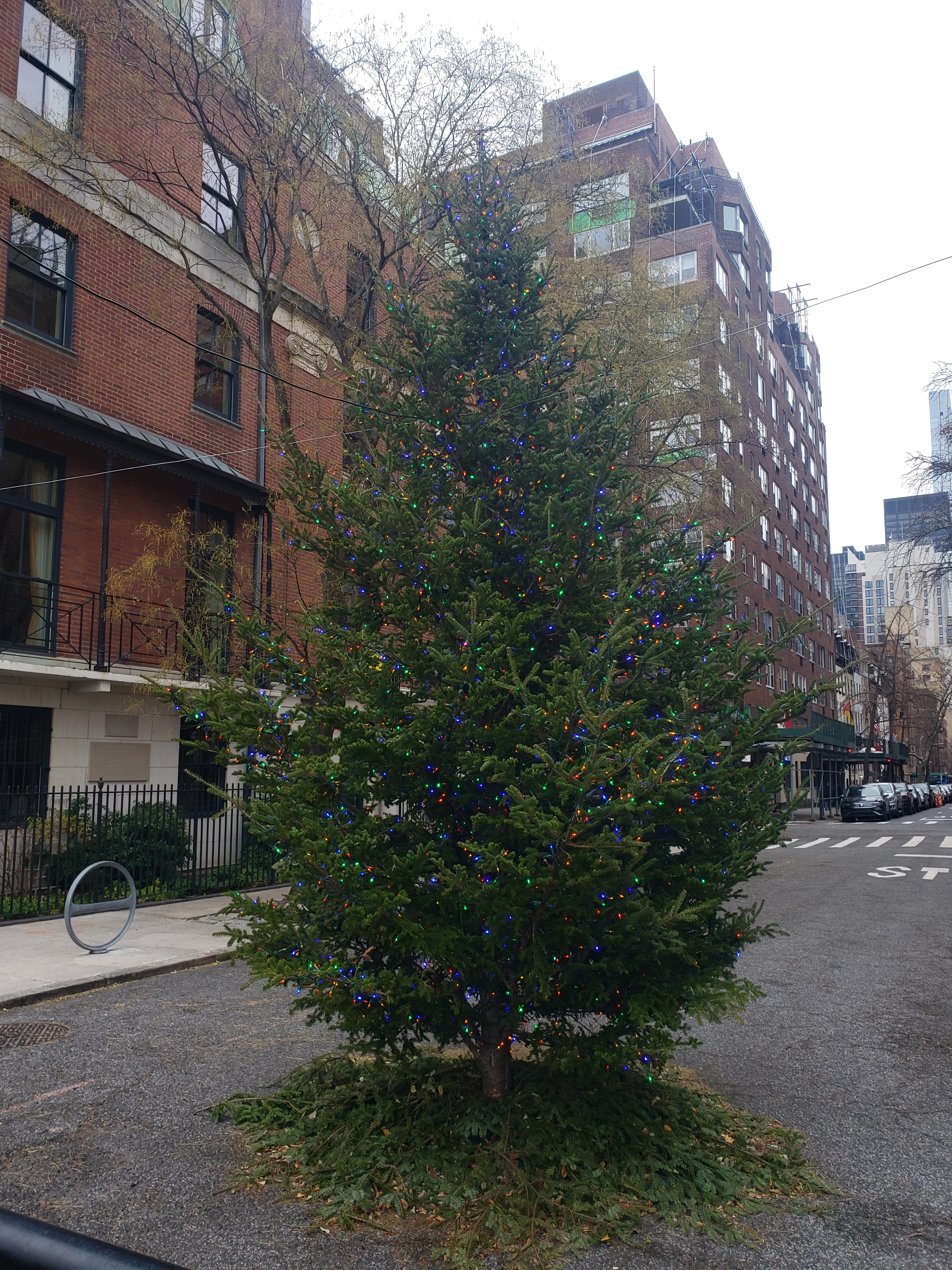
Christmas tree at the eastern end of 50th St., 2025

To the north of Turtle Bay is Sutton Place, to the west is Midtown, and to the south are Tudor City and Murray Hill.

=== Turtle Bay Association ===
The Turtle Bay Association, a neighborhood non-profit 501(c)3 organization, was founded in 1957 by James Amster to protest, successfully, the widening of East 49th Street. It now serves as an advocate for residents of Turtle Bay, and maintains the neighborhood's quality of life. The Association's efforts have resulted in more park and landscaping development, creating the neighborhood's tree-lined and relatively quiet atmosphere.

=== Economy ===
- Fujitsu operates an office at 733 Third Avenue.
- Avianca operates a New York-area sales office in Suite 2525 at 122 East 42nd Street.
- Ethiopian Airlines operates a sales office at 336 East 45th Street.
- Delta Air Lines operates a ticketing office in the 2 Grand Central Tower.
- As of 1975, Trans World Airlines was headquartered in Turtle Bay.

=== Diplomatic missions ===
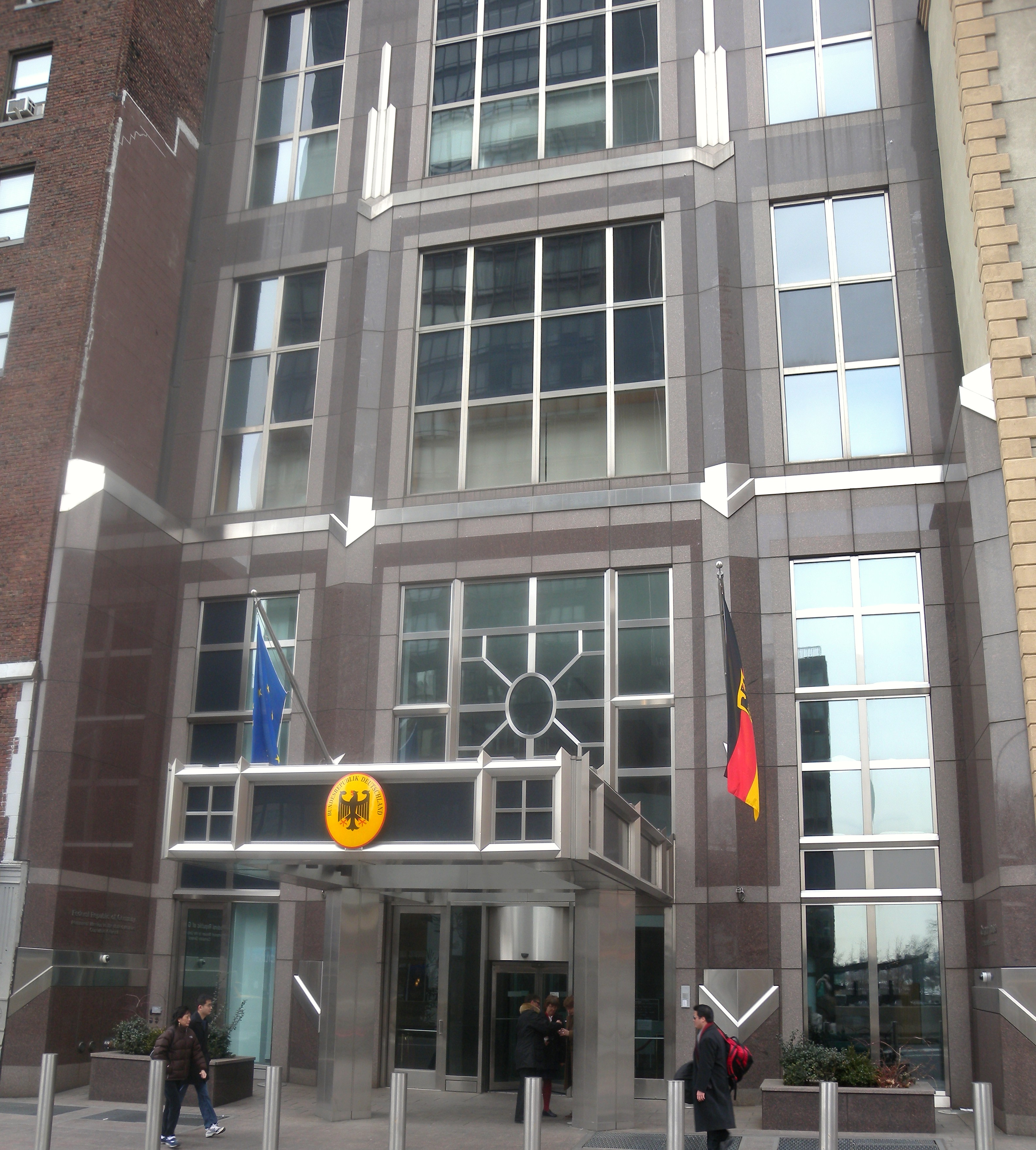
The German mission to the United Nations

Missions to the United States in Turtle Bay include:

- Consulate-General of the Bahamas
- Consulate-General of Germany
- Consulate-General of Israel
- Consulate-General of Jamaica
- Consulate-General of Luxembourg
- Consulate-General of Nepal
- Consulate-General of Nicaragua
- Consulate-General of Saudi Arabia
- Consulate-General of Singapore
- Consulate-General of South Africa
- Consulate-General of Turkey
- Consulate-General of Ukraine
- Consulate-General of the United Kingdom

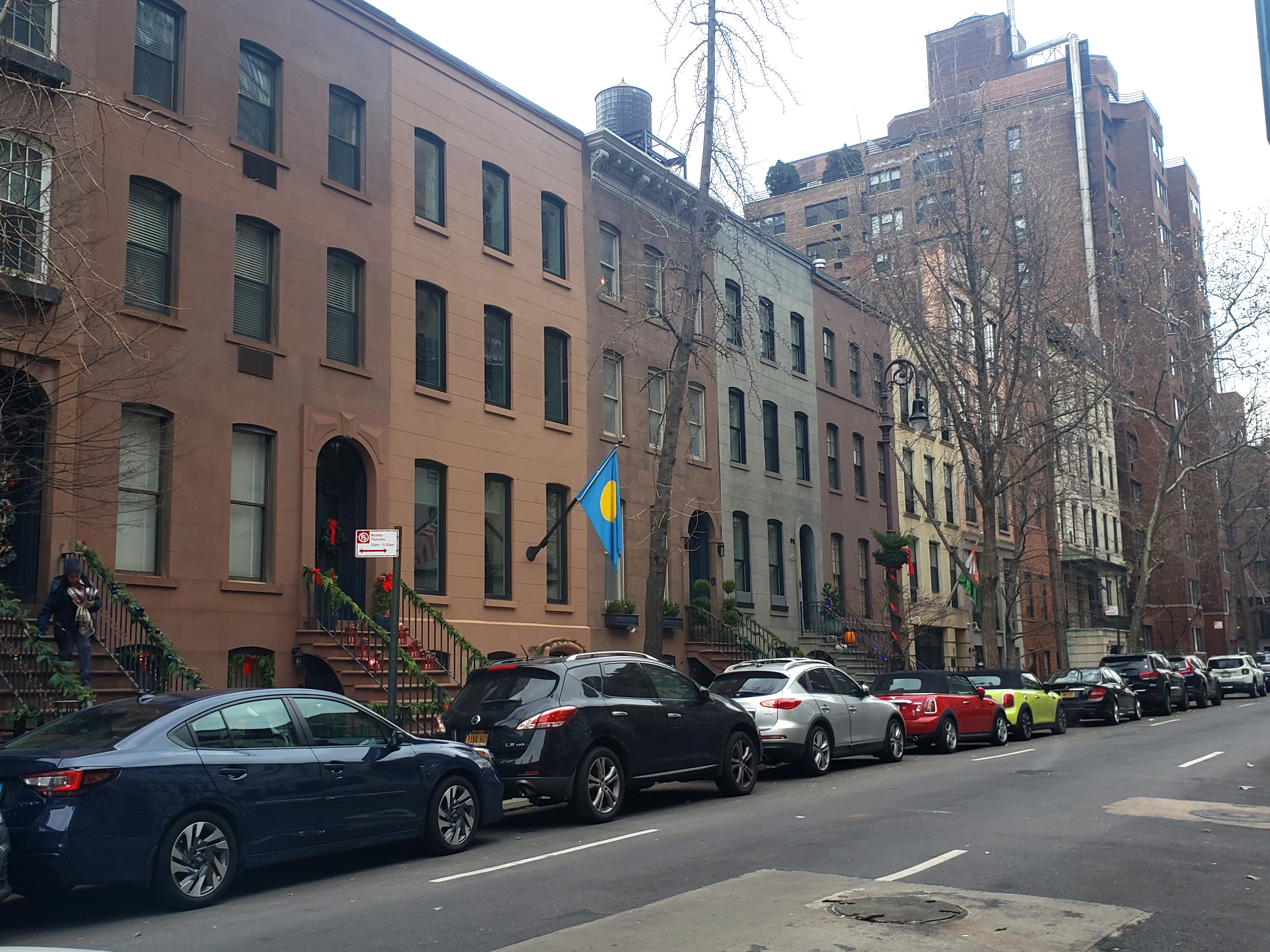
View of East 50th Street east of 1st Avenue; the Palau mission, center

Numerous other missions to the United Nations are in Turtle Bay, close to the UN. They include:

- Algeria
- Andorra
- Angola
- Antigua and Barbuda
- Argentina
- The Bahamas
- Bahrain
- Bangladesh
- Barbados
- Belgium
- Belize
- Bhutan
- Bolivia
- Bosnia and Herzegovina
- Botswana
- Brazil
- Brunei Darussalam
- Burundi
- Canada
- Chile
- Comoros
- Democratic Republic of the Congo
- Costa Rica
- Croatia
- Czech Republic
- Denmark
- Djibouti
- Dominica
- Dominican Republic
- Ecuador
- Egypt
- Equatorial Guinea
- Eritrea
- Estonia
- Eswatini
- Ethiopia
- Fiji
- France
- The Gambia
- Georgia
- Germany
- Greece
- Grenada
- Guinea-Bissau
- Guyana
- Haiti
- Honduras
- Hungary
- Iceland
- India
- Ireland
- Israel
- Italy
- Ivory Coast (Côte d'Ivoire)
- Jamaica
- Jordan
- Kazakhstan
- Kenya
- Kiribati
- Kuwait
- Kyrgyzstan
- Laos
- Latvia
- Lebanon
- Liberia
- Libya
- Luxembourg
- Madagascar
- Malawi
- Malaysia
- Maldives
- Marshall Islands
- Mauritania
- Mauritius
- Mexico
- Monaco
- Morocco
- Mozambique
- Nepal
- Netherlands
- Nicaragua
- Niger
- North Macedonia
- North Korea
- Oman
- Palau
- Paraguay
- Peru
- Poland
- Portugal
- Qatar
- Saint Vincent and the Grenadines
- Samoa
- San Marino
- São Tomé and Príncipe
- Saudi Arabia
- Senegal
- Seychelles
- Sierra Leone
- Singapore
- Slovakia
- Solomon Islands
- South Africa
- South Korea
- South Sudan
- Spain
- Sri Lanka
- Sudan
- Sweden
- Syria
- Tanzania
- Tonga
- Tunisia
- Turkey
- Turkmenistan
- Tuvalu
- Uganda
- Ukraine
- United Arab Emirates
- United Kingdom
- United States
- Vanuatu
- Venezuela
- Vietnam
- Yemen
- Zambia
- Zimbabwe

== Architectural landmarks ==
Several sites in Turtle Bay have been designated by the New York City Landmarks Preservation Commission (LPC) as official city landmarks and/or are listed on the National Register of Historic Places (NRHP). These include several institutional headquarters. In the southern section of Turtle Bay, between 42nd and 43rd Streets east of Second Avenue, the Ford Foundation Building and its lobby interior are designated as city landmarks. One block north is the former Beaux-Arts Institute of Design (now the Permanent Mission of Egypt to the United Nations) at 304 East 44th Street is designated as a New York City landmark. The headquarters of the Japan Society at 333 East 47th Street has also been designated as a city landmark.

Several apartments and houses in Turtle Bay have also been designated as landmarks. The Beaux-Arts Apartments, a pair of artists' residential apartments across the street from each other at 307 and 310 East 44th Street, are city landmarks. The Panhellenic Tower apartment hotel near First Avenue and 49th Street is also a city landmark. A portion of the Tudor City Historic District, a city and NRHP district, extends into Turtle Bay. Individual houses designated as city landmarks include the Paul Rudolph Penthouse and Apartments at 23 Beekman Place; the Lescaze House at 211 East 48th Street, also listed on the NRHP; the Morris B. Sanders Studio & Apartment at 219 East 49th Street; the Rockefeller Guest House at 242 East 52nd Street; and 312 and 314 East 53rd Street. The Turtle Bay Gardens Historic District, a city and NRHP district, consists of twenty rowhouses on 48th and 49th Streets between Second and Third Avenues.

There are some other historical sites in Turtle Bay as well. The first-floor interior of the Millennium Hilton New York One UN Plaza hotel is also a city landmark, though not any other portions of the interior or exterior. Amster Yard, a courtyard at 211-215 East 49th Street designed by James Amster, is also a city landmark.

== Police and crime ==
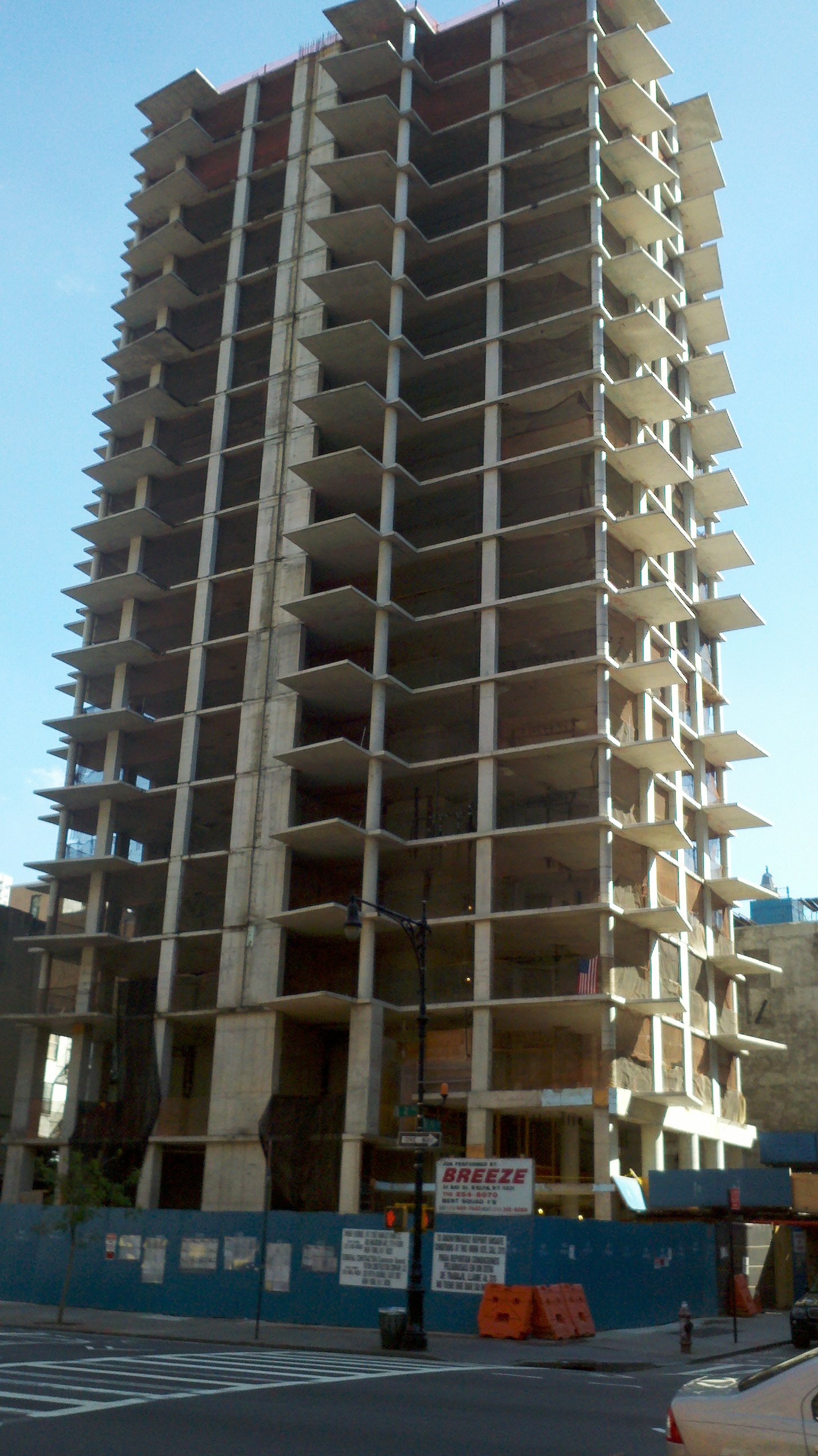
303 East 51st Street apartment building under construction, 2012

Turtle Bay and Murray Hill are patrolled by the 17th Precinct of the NYPD, located at 167 East 51st Street. The 17th Precinct and neighboring 13th Precinct ranked 57th safest out of 69 patrol areas for per-capita crime in 2010. The high per-capita crime rate is attributed to the precincts' high number of property crimes. As of 2018, with a non-fatal assault rate of 35 per 100,000 people, Turtle Bay and Stuyvesant Town's rate of violent crimes per capita is less than that of the city as a whole. The incarceration rate of 180 per 100,000 people is lower than that of the city as a whole.

The 17th Precinct has a lower crime rate than in the 1990s, with crimes across all categories having decreased by 80.7% between 1990 and 2018. The precinct reported no murders, 13 rapes, 63 robberies, 91 felony assaults, 80 burglaries, 748 grand larcenies, and 26 grand larcenies auto in 2018.

== Fire safety ==
Turtle Bay is served by the New York City Fire Department (FDNY)'s Engine Company 8/Ladder Company 2/Battalion 8, located at 165 East 51st Street.

== Health ==
As of 2018, preterm births and births to teenage mothers in Turtle Bay and Stuyvesant Town are lower than the city average. In Turtle Bay and Stuyvesant Town, there were 78 preterm births per 1,000 live births (compared to 87 per 1,000 citywide), and 1.5 births to teenage mothers per 1,000 live births (compared to 19.3 per 1,000 citywide), though the teenage birth rate was based on a small sample size. Turtle Bay and Stuyvesant Town have a low population of residents who are uninsured. In 2018, this population of uninsured residents was estimated to be 3%, less than the citywide rate of 12%, though this was based on a small sample size.

The concentration of fine particulate matter, the deadliest type of air pollutant, in Turtle Bay and Stuyvesant Town is 0.0102 milligrams per cubic metre (1.02×10^{−8} oz/ft^{3}), more than the city average. Twelve percent of Turtle Bay and Stuyvesant Town residents are smokers, which is less than the city average of 14% of residents being smokers. In Turtle Bay and Stuyvesant Town, 10% of residents are obese, 5% are diabetic, and 18% have high blood pressure—compared to the citywide averages of 24%, 11%, and 28% respectively. In addition, 7% of children are obese, compared to the citywide average of 20%.

Ninety-one percent of residents eat some fruits and vegetables every day, which is higher than the city's average of 87%. In 2018, 90% of residents described their health as "good", "very good", or "excellent", more than the city's average of 78%. For every supermarket in Turtle Bay and Stuyvesant Town, there are 7 bodegas.

The Bellevue Hospital Center and NYU Langone Medical Center are located in nearby Kips Bay. In addition, Beth Israel Medical Center in Stuyvesant Town operated until 2025.

== Post offices and ZIP Codes ==
Turtle Bay is located in two primary ZIP Codes. The area south of 49th Street is part of 10017 and the area north of 49th Street is part of 10022. The United States Postal Service operates two post offices near Turtle Bay:

- Grand Central Station – 450 Lexington Avenue
- FDR Station – 909 Third Avenue

== Education ==
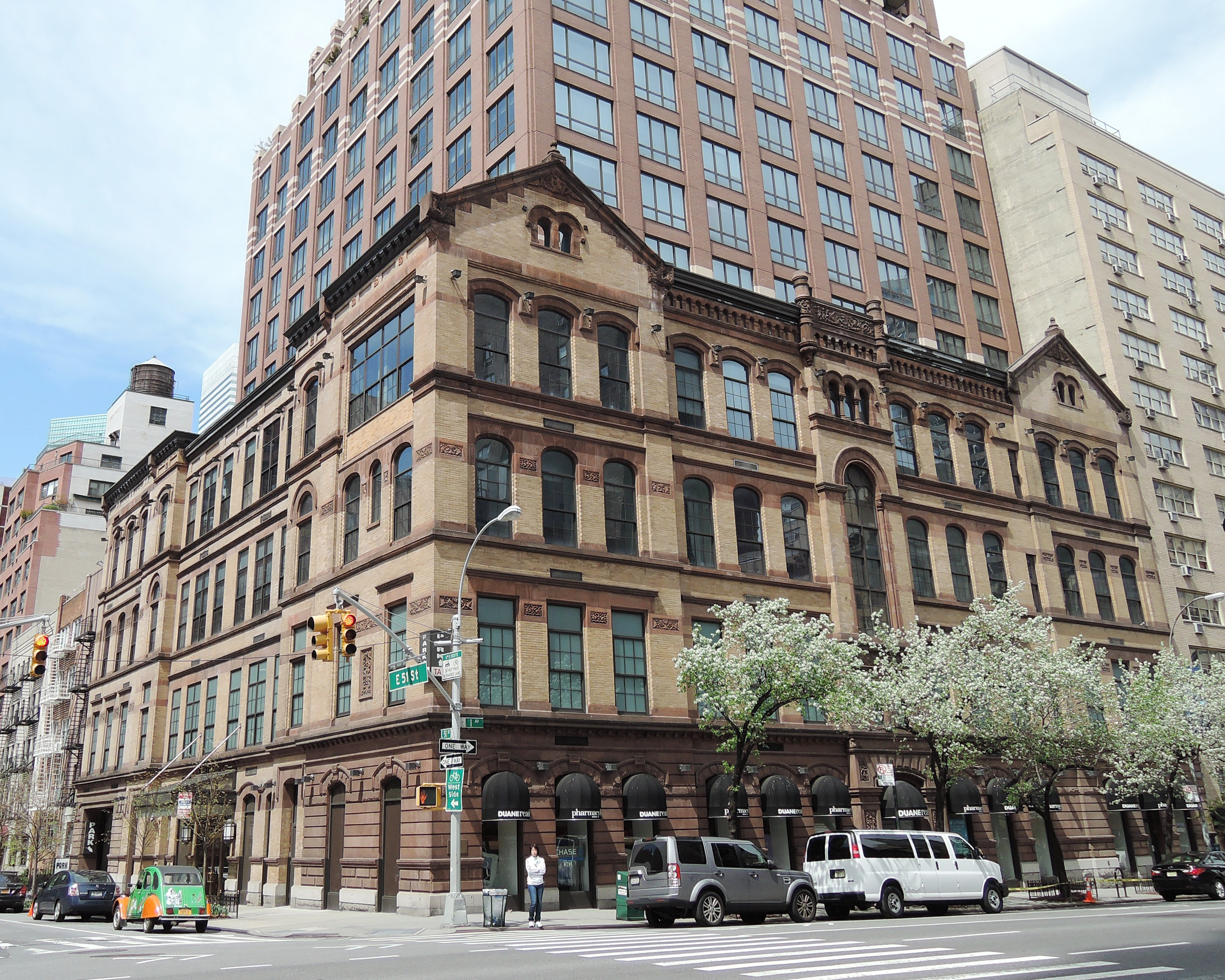
Former P.S. 135, now condominiums

Turtle Bay and Stuyvesant Town generally have a higher rate of college-educated residents than the rest of the city as of 2018. A majority of residents age 25 and older (82%) have a college education or higher, while 3% have less than a high school education and 15% are high school graduates or have some college education. By contrast, 64% of Manhattan residents and 43% of city residents have a college education or higher. The percentage of Turtle Bay and Stuyvesant Town students excelling in math rose from 61% in 2000 to 80% in 2011, and reading achievement increased from 66% to 68% during the same time period.

Turtle Bay and Stuyvesant Town's rate of elementary school student absenteeism is lower than the rest of New York City. In Turtle Bay and Stuyvesant Town, 8% of elementary school students missed twenty or more days per school year, less than the citywide average of 20%. Additionally, 91% of high school students in Turtle Bay and Stuyvesant Town graduate on time, more than the citywide average of 75%.

=== Schools ===
The New York City Department of Education does not operate any public schools in Turtle Bay. Students in grades PK–5 are zoned to PS 59 Beekman Hill International in Lenox Hill and students in grades 6–8 are zoned to IS 104 Simon Baruch School in Gramercy Park. Formerly, P.S. 135 operated inside Turtle Bay. The structure now contains condominiums and is listed on the National Register of Historic Places.

There are no zoned high schools in New York City. However, the Art and Design High School, a vocational school, serves grades 9–12.

=== Libraries ===
The New York Public Library (NYPL) operates two branches near Turtle Bay:

- The 58th Street branch is located at 127 East 58th Street. The branch opened in a Carnegie library building in 1907 and moved to its current two-story space in 1969.
- The Grand Central branch is located at 135 East 46th Street. The two-story library opened in 2008.

== Parks and recreation ==
Manhattan Community District 6, which includes Turtle Bay, has the lowest ratio of public park space per capita of all community districts in the borough and also ranks second to last among all community districts in New York City with regards to the percentage of district land that is parkland. Parks in Turtle Bay include:

- Dag Hammarskjöld Plaza is located on the south side of East 47th Street between First and Second Avenues. The park was originally conceived in 1947 as part of a new landscaped approach to the headquarters of the United Nations.
- Greenacre Park is a privately owned, publicly accessible park located on East 51st Street between Second and Third avenues. The park was donated by Abby Rockefeller Mauzé in 1971.
- MacArthur Playground is located to the west of the FDR Drive between East 48th and 49th streets. The playground was constructed as part of the adjacent building at 860-870 United Nations Plaza and was ceded to New York City.
- Peter Detmold Park is located on the west side of the FDR Drive between East 49th and 51st streets. The park was named after a former Turtle Bay resident that was murdered in 1972.
- Ralph Bunche Park, located on the west side of First Avenue between East 42nd and 43rd streets, was created in 1948 as part of the widening of First Avenue for the development of the United Nations headquarters.

== Transportation ==
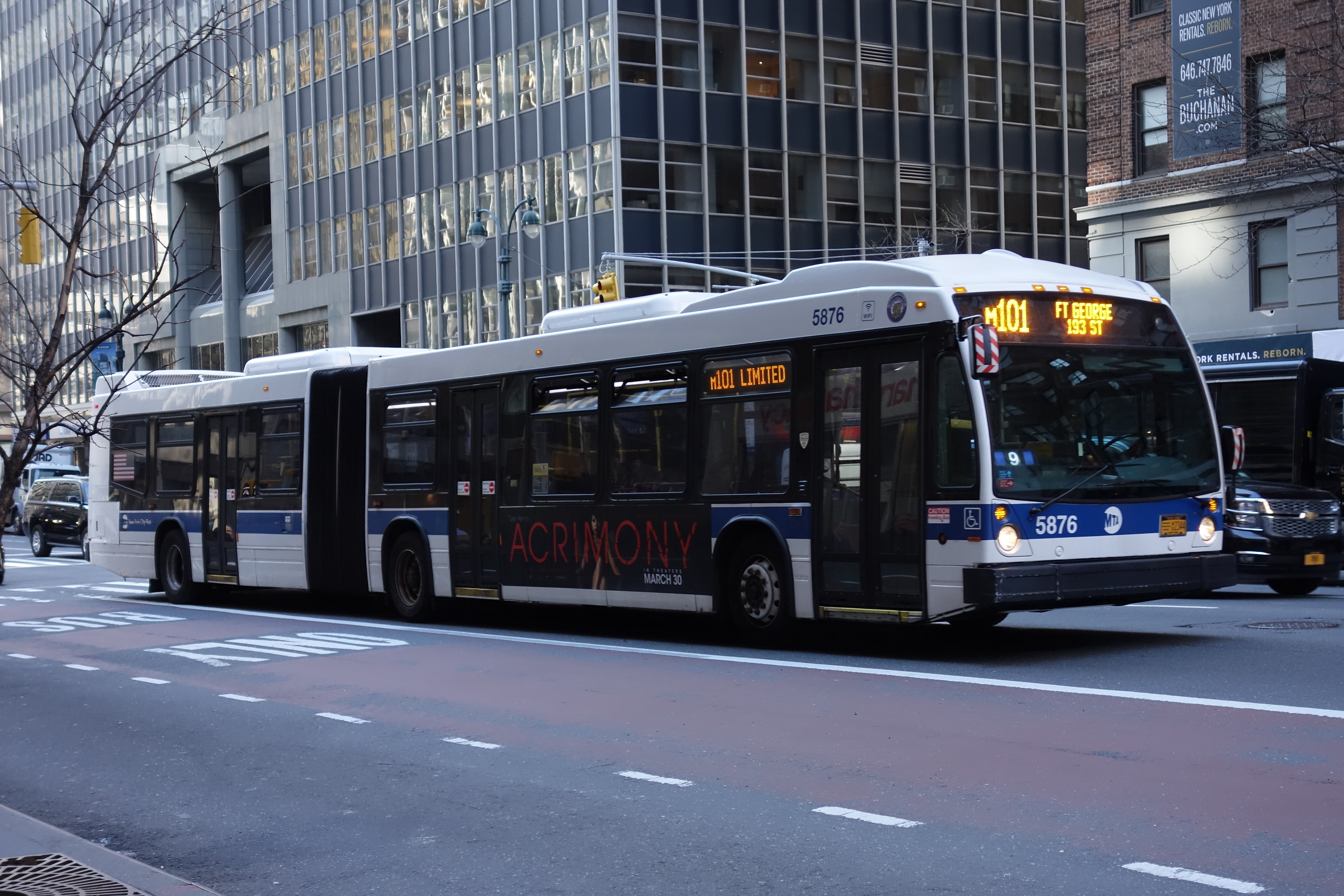
A bus on Third Avenue

The closest New York City Subway stations are at the western border of the neighborhood, at Lexington Avenue/51st–53rd Streets (4, 6, <6>, E, F, and <F> trains) and Grand Central–42nd Street (4, 5, 6, <6>, 7, <7>, and S trains); the latter has a connection to the Metro-North Railroad at Grand Central Terminal and the Long Island Rail Road at Grand Central Madison. Local New York City Bus lines include M15, M15 SBS, M42, M50, M101, M102 and M103.

The only major thoroughfare is the FDR Drive, at the neighborhood's eastern border. The Queens Midtown Tunnel (I-495) and Queensboro Bridge (NY 25) are located just south and north, respectively, of the neighborhood.

== In popular culture ==
- In 1917, the first movies in which silent-film comedian Buster Keaton appeared were produced at fellow comic Fatty Arbuckle's Comique Film Studio at 318–320 East 48th Street, a warehouse building later occupied by the 20th Century parking garage.
- Turtle Bay is the setting for a considerable portion of the Kurt Vonnegut science fiction novel Slapstick, as well as the location of the (fictional) painter Dan Gregory's mansion (in the brownstones of 48th Street between 2nd and 3rd Avenues) in his novel Bluebeard.
- The animated series The Venture Bros.'s pilot episode is entitled "The Terrible Secret of Turtle Bay" and takes place largely at the UN headquarters.
- Turtle Bay is the location of a vacant lot in Stephen King's Dark Tower series, where the Tower takes the form of The Rose. Later, the lot is revealed to be the site of 1 Dag Hammarskjöld Plaza.
- In the song "Stars and The Moon" from the musical revue Songs for a New World by Jason Robert Brown, a rich suitor promises to buy the singer a "townhouse in Turtle Bay".
- Turtle Bay, and specifically Beekman Place, is home to the fictional character "Mame Dennis" in the novel Auntie Mame by Patrick Dennis, as well as in the Broadway play, musical and the films based on it.
- Turtle Bay is the home of the fictional lawyer Stone Barrington in a series of novels by Stuart Woods.
- Turtle Bay is the location of the "old willow tree" that is "long-suffering and much-climbed, held together by strings of wire but beloved of those who know it" that E. B. White writes "symbolizes the city" in his essay "Here Is New York".
- The iconic Modernist apartment towers at 860–870 United Nations Plaza are the setting for the 1969 romantic comedy film The April Fools, starring Jack Lemmon and Catherine Deneuve.
- The historical records for the "Turtle Bay Gardens Historic District" (1983) list Katharine Hepburn and Stephen Sondheim as residents.
