= P.S. 135 =

Historic school in Manhattan, New York

- U.S. National Register of Historic Places
- New York State Register of Historic Places
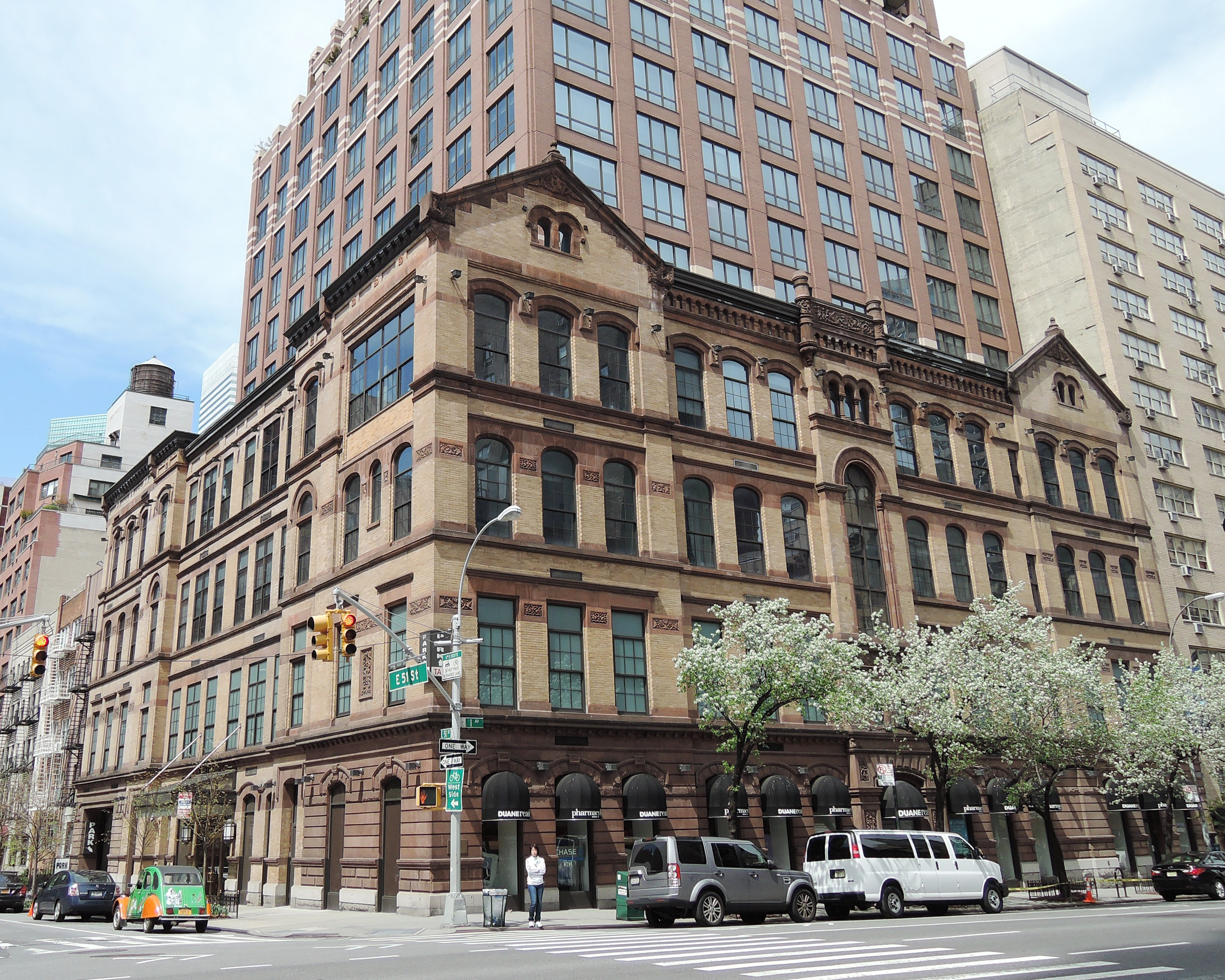
- (2013)

- Location within New York City Location within New York Location within the United States
- Location: 931 1st Avenue; Manhattan, New York City
- Coordinates: 40°45′17″N 73°57′57″W
- Built: 1892
- Architect: George W. Debevoise
- Architectural style: Romanesque
- NRHP reference No.: 80002710
- NYSRHP No.: 06101.000637

Significant dates
- Added to NRHP: October 27, 1980
- Designated NYSRHP: September 4, 1980

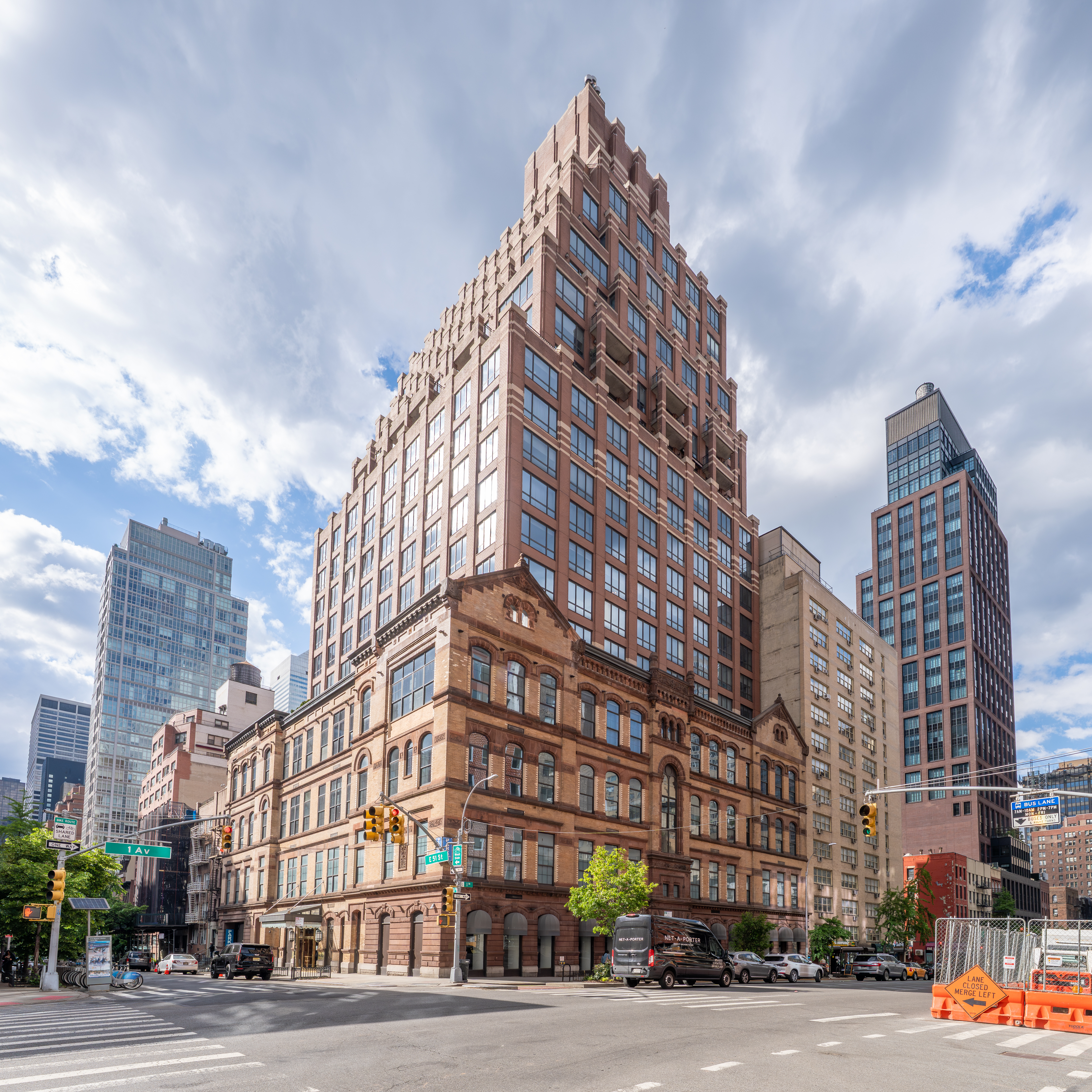
PS. 135 with the new Building (2026)

P.S. 135 (Public School 135), also known as P.S. 35 (Public School 35), is a historic school building located at 931 First Avenue at East 51st Street in the Turtle Bay neighborhood of Manhattan, New York City. It was built in 1892 on the site of "Mount Pleasant", the estate of James Beekman. The school was designed by George W. Debevoise in the Romanesque Revival style, and has been at various times a community center, a homeless shelter and a nursery school, as well as the United Nations International School. There was an addition made to the building in 1904.

The building was added to the National Register of Historic Places in 1980. A condominium tower, The Beekman Regent designed by architect Costas Kondylis, was built inside the facade of the building in 2000.

== See also ==
- Facadism
- National Register of Historic Places listings in Manhattan from 14th to 59th Streets
