= James Amster =

American interior decorator

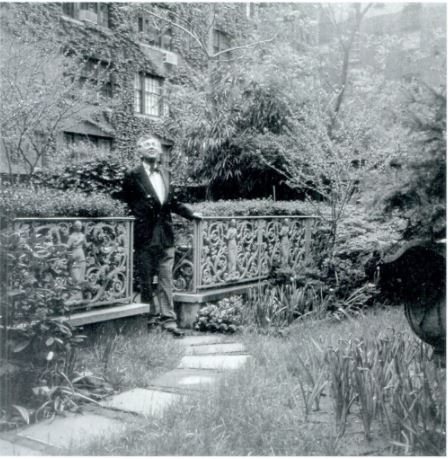
James Amster in Amster Yard in the 1960s

James Amster (July 18, 1908 – June 11, 1986) was an interior decorator in New York City in the 1960s who created Amster Yard, a New York City designated landmark.

== Early life ==
Amster was born on July 18, 1908, in Lynn, Massachusetts, and grew up in Boston, in a house with a yard, probably the reason why he decided to restore Amster Yard in Manhattan.

Amster attended the Museum of Fine Arts, Boston, where he studied sculpture and painting.

== Career ==
Amster was known for his community involvement in the Turtle Bay, Manhattan, neighborhood, and for his traditional style as an interior decorator.

At first, Amster worked for Bergdorf Goodman, a luxury goods department store based on Fifth Avenue in New York City, and opened and managed its decorating and antiques department.

Amster went solo in 1938, opening his design firm. Among his clients: businesses, shipbuilders and hotels in both Central America and the United States. He is the interior designer responsible for the redecoration of The Pierre, a luxury hotel located at 2 East 61st Street, Manhattan.

In 1957, Amster founded E. 49th Street Association, later Turtle Bay Association. The first meetings of the association were held at Amster Yard.

Amster was also affiliated with the Prescott Neighborhood House (chairman), the Prescott Nursery School (chairman) and the Friends of Peter Detmold Park Foundation (president). Peter Detmold (1923–1972) was a friend of Amster from the Turtle Bay Association, who was killed in 1972; his murderer was never found.

=== Amster Yard ===
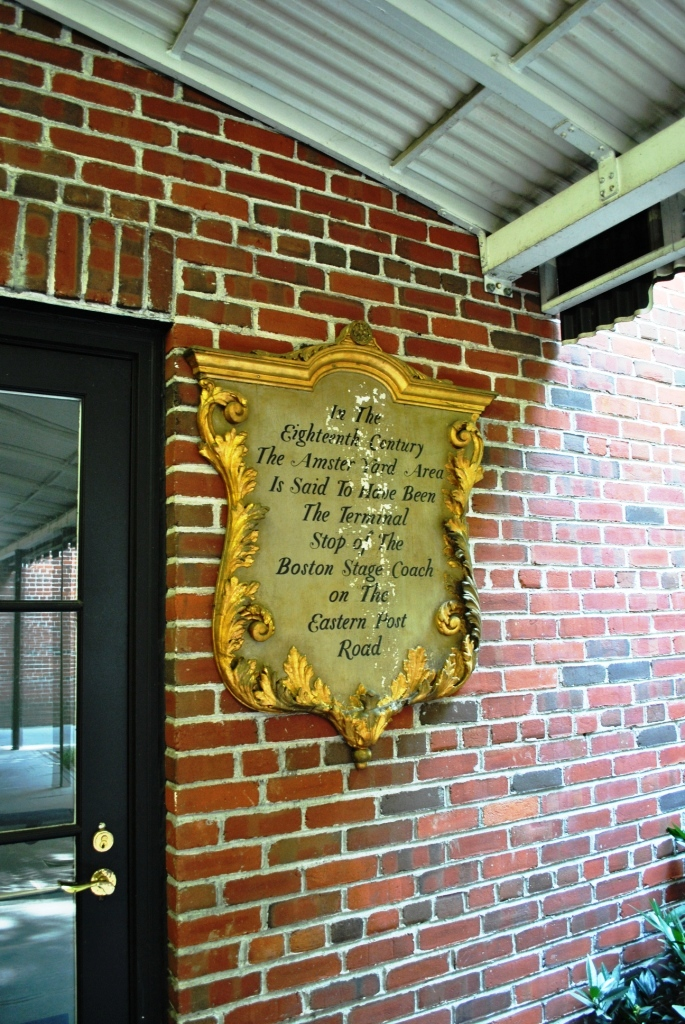
Original Boston Stage Coach marker

In 1944, Amster restored what is now known as Amster Yard at 211 1/2 East 49th Street. The complex of five buildings, set around a courtyard, was originally a 19th-century boarding house, a station of the Boston Post Road and a commercial yard, but it was abandoned when Amster purchased it. Amster renovated the complex thanks to architect Ted Sandier and artist Harold Sterner, creating an inner yard connecting several apartments/studios which he rented to many key figures in the design field.

One of the apartments was Amster's home, which he decorated with Biedermeier furniture. During the party hosted by Amster to inaugurate the Yard, Elsie de Wolfe, mentor to Amster, suggested that he put a mirror at one end of the Yard to give the impression that the Yard was bigger. Amster framed the mirror inside an arch, and the mirror remained in place in the yard through the 21st century. In 1966, the New York City Landmarks Preservation Commission (LPC) designated the yard and its surrounding buildings as a city landmark, citing the yard's character and its history as a stagecoach stop.

== Personal life ==
James Amster was in a long-lasting relationship with Robert K. Moyer. Concerning the Amster-Moyer relationship, journalist and friend Mike Wallace described them in 1995 as "a wonderful old married couple" and "both people that [sic] I admired".

Amster was also friends with Constance Spry, British educator and florist, and Syrie Maugham, leading British interior decorator of the 1920s and 1930s and wife to W. Somerset Maugham.

Amster died of leukemia on June 11, 1986. Moyer continued to live at Amster Yard until 1992, when he was the last tenant to move out. Amster Yard was acquired in 1999 and renovated by the Instituto Cervantes, New York, and since 2002, the Instituto allows people to use the yard as a pocket park. However, when the Instituto acquired the property, much of it was destroyed and replaced with a replica, to which preservationists expressed disappointment.
