= Amster Yard =

Enclave in Manhattan, New York

Coordinates: 40°45′18.5″N 73°58′13.2″W

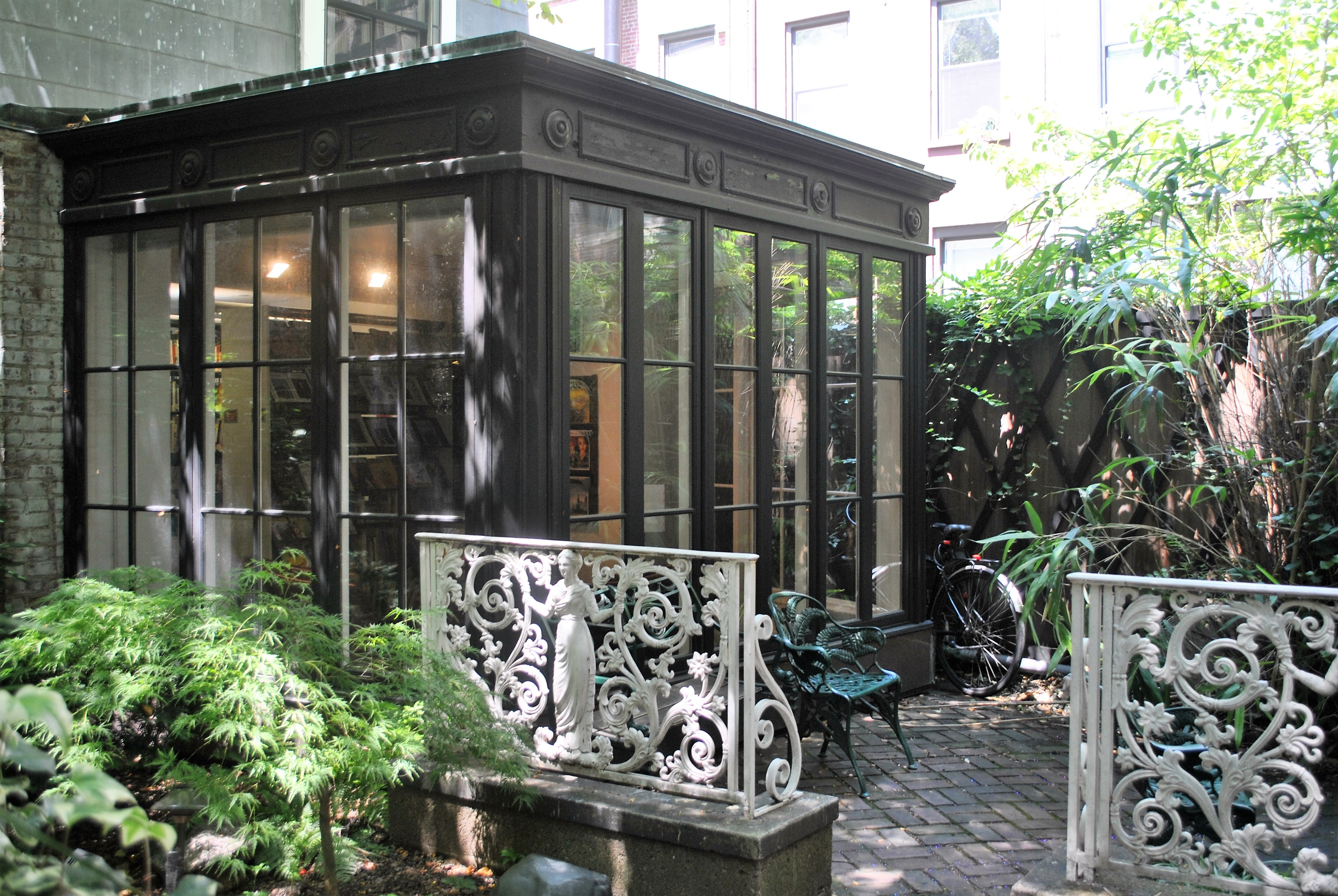
The entrance to James Amster's apartment

Amster Yard is a small enclave in the East Midtown and Turtle Bay neighborhoods of Manhattan in New York City, consisting of a courtyard and five surrounding structures. The L-shaped yard, created by the artist James Amster between 1944 and 1946, is in the middle of the block bounded clockwise from south by 49th Street, Third Avenue, 50th Street, and Second Avenue. The five buildings were remodeled by Ted Sandler and Harold Sterner. Since 1999, the yard and its surrounding structures have been owned by the Instituto Cervantes New York, a non-profit organization created by the Spanish government.

The entrance to the yard is underneath two buildings on 49th Street. Amster created the yard with plantings, a walkway, and a courtyard surrounded by multiple 19th-century low-rise buildings. There were commercial shops on the ground level and six apartments above. The three structures in the rear of the courtyard are replicas of the original structures. Beneath the yard itself are numerous spaces for the Instituto Cervantes, including an auditorium, library, and gallery.

The building was originally a 19th-century boarding house, a station of the Boston Post Road and a commercial yard, but was abandoned by the time Amster bought it in 1944. Amster Yard became a popular meeting place within the Turtle Bay community in the decades after its completion. In 1966, the New York City Landmarks Preservation Commission designated the yard as a city landmark. Amster died in 1986, but his longtime partner Robert K. Moyer continued to live there until 1992, when he was the last residential tenant to move out. Amster Yard was acquired in 1999 by the Instituto Cervantes, which installed new facilities under the original yard and replaced several structures in the rear with replicas. Following the renovations, the enclave was reopened in October 2003.

== Description ==
Amster Yard is at 213 East 49th Street in the East Midtown and Turtle Bay neighborhoods of Manhattan in New York City. It occupies an irregularly shaped lot on the block bounded by 49th Street to the south, Second Avenue to the east, 50th Street to the north, and Third Avenue to the west. The structures comprising Amster Yard was assembled by interior designer James Amster in 1944 and opened in 1946. Nearby buildings and places include Smith & Wollensky directly to the west; 219 East 49th Street directly to the east; Turtle Bay Gardens to the southeast; and Lescaze House to the south.

The complex consists of five buildings covering 17,500 square feet (1,630 m^{2}). The structures were renovated by Ted Sandler, who normally worked as an architect, and Harold Sterner, who normally worked as an artist. According to Architectural Record magazine, Sterner was the architect for the project and Sandler was the interior design consultant. In addition, Sheppard-Pollack Inc. was the general contractor. Amster Yard was largely intended from the start as a commercial enclave; other midblock enclaves of its kind, such as Washington Mews, Pomander Walk, or Strivers' Row, were mostly residential by contrast.

=== Buildings ===
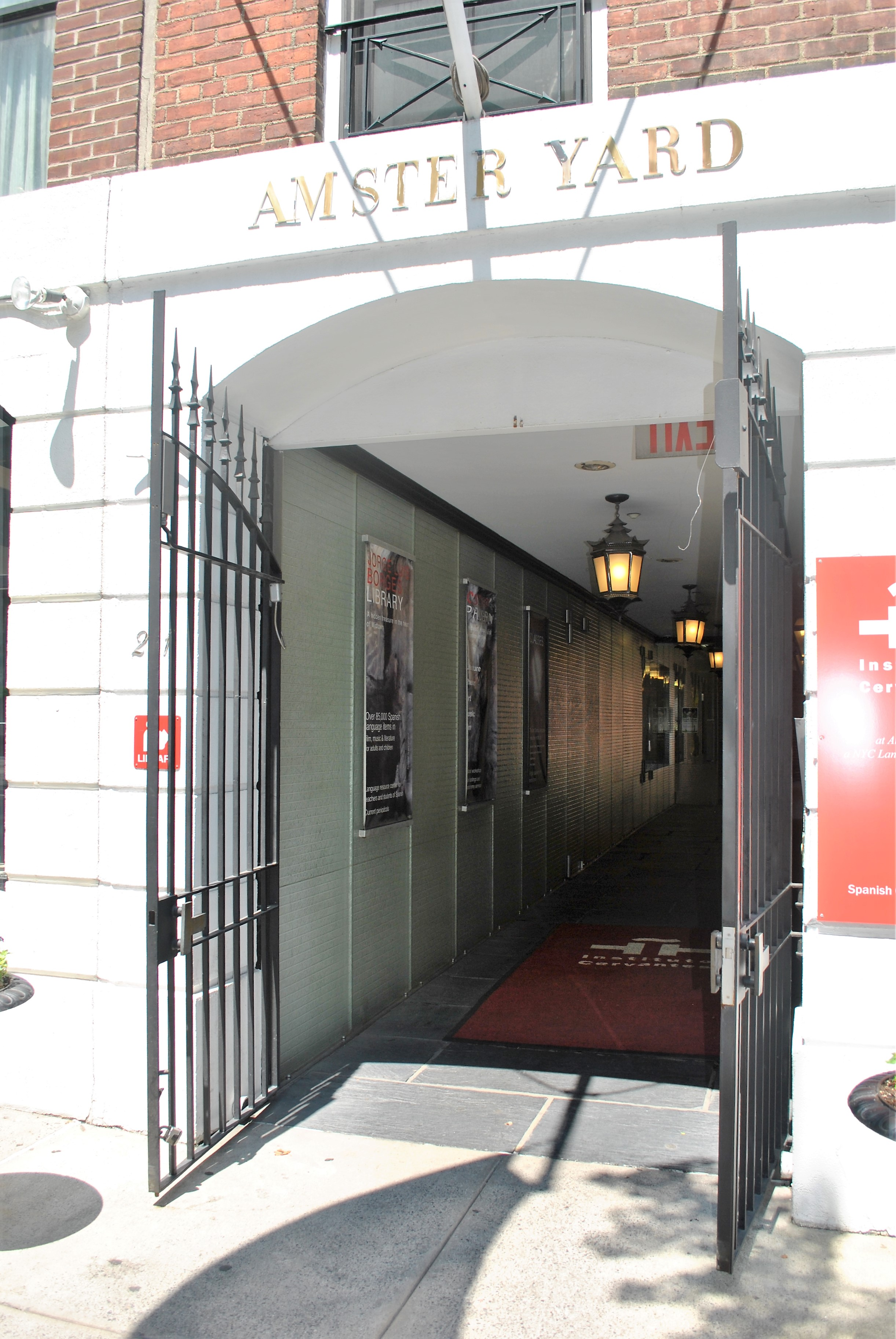
The original entrance to Amster Yard

The five buildings originally ranged between one and four stories and were composed of apartments, stores, and offices. On the south side of the yard are two Federal style structures at 211 and 215 East 49th Street, the only structures remaining from the original complex. The former is four stories high while the latter is three stories. Both of the 49th Street houses have a facade of stone on the ground level and brick on the upper stories. The western structure at 211 East 49th Street has an arch in the middle of the ground story which leads to the courtyard in the rear. The eastern structure at 215 East 49th Street has a slightly projecting center bay, as well as a ground-floor shop that contains a rear entrance into the yard proper. These structures had been constructed in the 19th century as brownstone townhouses, but they were refaced with limestone and brick when Amster renovated the properties in the 1940s.

In the rear of the yard was a Greek handicraft store where Jacqueline Kennedy used to shop. The other two structures at the north side of the yard were a three-story building to the west, as well as a two-bedroom, double-story bungalow to the east. The structures on the northern boundary of the courtyard may have once been horse stables. The first stories of these structures were converted to showrooms, offices, storage rooms, and water heaters. The first-floor spaces contained Sterner's and Amster's offices, as well as shops for antiques and textiles. There was also a full-service laundry shared by all the tenants. The rear buildings were all demolished in 2001 and replaced with identical replicas.

When Amster renovated the buildings, they were arranged as six apartments. Three units were at the front of the complex, consisting of two duplex units and a single-story unit at 211 and 215 East 49th Street, above the shop and the archway. (Note: Unit 1 occupied the second and third floors of 215 East 49th Street. Unit 2 occupied the second floor of 211 East 49th Street. Unit 3 occupied the third and fourth floors of 211 East 49th Street. Unit 3 had the most rooms, followed by unit 1 and unit 2.) The other three units at the rear were all single-story apartments. Two occupied the second and third floors of the three-story structure and were connected by a new stair hall, while the other was on the second floor of the bungalow. The interiors of the apartments were meant to maximize light and also provide privacy, as many of the bedrooms faced the yard. Amster originally coordinated the color schemes of each apartment according to each tenant's preference, but the shared areas had a common color scheme of deep green alongside numerous shades of gray.

=== Yard ===
The yard proper consists of a 4,000-square-foot (370 m^{2}) courtyard with cobblestone paving. The yard was originally decorated with ivy walls, painted windows, and iron grilles on the surrounding buildings, as well as lampposts in the yard proper. When the yard was opened in 1946, Amster's mentor and friend Elsie de Wolfe suggested that he put a mirror at the north end of the yard to give the impression of a larger space. Amster framed the mirror inside an arch, which remained in place through the 21st century. The exterior walls facing the courtyard were painted in light gray, and the existing trees were retained in the 1940s renovation. Sculptures and ironwork were used as decorative elements. Along the southern side of the courtyard was a loggia with a metal canopy and a flagstone floor. The courtyard was planted with various flowers.

The original courtyard was extensively renovated in the early 2000s, with new facilities being installed underneath for the occupant, the Instituto Cervantes New York. The newer structures include a 132-seat auditorium measuring 40 by 40 feet (12 by 12 m) across, excavated 19 feet (5.8 m) deep. The facilities also include a library with capacity for 65,000 volumes and a 1,600-square-foot (150 m^{2}) gallery. Classrooms, offices, and a wine-tasting room are also underneath the yard. A modern glass bridge also spans the yard, connecting the institute's structures.

== History ==
=== Early history ===
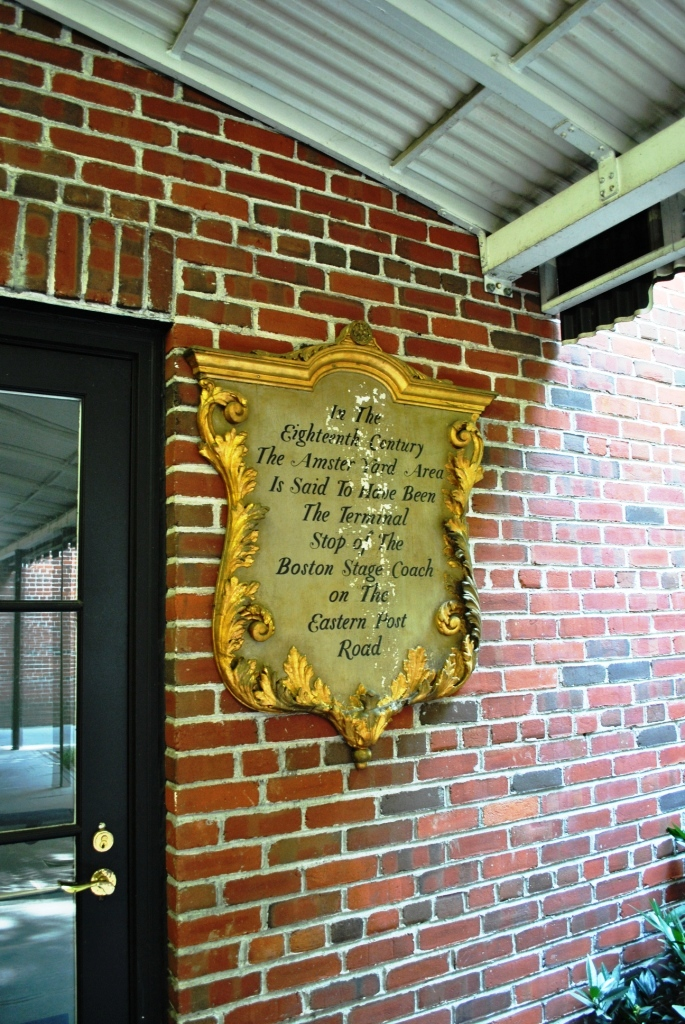
Original Boston Stage Coach marker

The buildings that originally comprised Amster Yard were built in the late 19th century. According to tax records, the lots surrounding the yard were owned by John Molloy in 1870, when he constructed a "one-story carpenter shop" on the northern side of the yard. The site also contained a 19th-century boarding house, a station of the Boston Post Road, and a commercial yard. The region was reportedly the terminus of the Boston Post Road during the 18th century.

In the early 20th century, a large portion of Turtle Bay's population was involved in the arts or architecture, and structures such as the Beaux-Arts Institute of Design and the residential Turtle Bay Gardens and Beaux-Arts Apartments were constructed for this community. William Lescaze's renovation of an existing brownstone townhouse on 48th Street, and its subsequent conversion into the Lescaze House, inspired similar renovations to other structures in the neighborhood. By the 1940s, the site was filled by a tenement boardinghouse; shops for a cobbler, plumber, and electrician; and a courtyard littered with debris. It had also contained the studio of sculptor Isamu Noguchi at the time.

=== Creation and early years ===
James Amster, a popular figure in New York City social life in the mid-20th century, bought the buildings from the City Bank Farmers Trust Company in June 1944. He had learned about the structures during a party, when two guests in the real estate industry had told Amster about the property. Initially, the existing structures were planned to be destroyed. (Note: Sources disagree over whether Amster wanted to demolish the structures on his own initiative, or whether the guests had suggested that Amster should demolish the site.) A 15-story building was planned for the site, but Bernard Baruch, a friend of Amster's father, suggested against it. Any new structure on the site required a minimum backyard depth of 21 to 25 feet (6.4 to 7.6 m). Zoning regulations also dictated that two-thirds of the property's rear section be offices and stores. Consequently, Amster decided to market the development to decorators, given the yard's proximity to the antique and fabric stores on Third Avenue. The renovation of the dilapidated structures involved "indefatigable shopping", as described in the Architectural Forum, though some materials were substituted if they could not be easily found.

Amster hosted a party on May 23, 1946, to celebrate the opening of the yard and residential structures. There were seven hundred guests, including Amster's friends and clients, as well as journalists. Amster subsequently recalled that he believed the yard added to "the city's civic pride". The apartments were originally rented to eight people, all of whom had agreed to occupy the space before renovations started. Sterner and his wife Paula took one unit and Amster took another. Amster's apartment, above the shop at 215 East 49th Street, was decorated with Biedermeier furniture. The December 9, 1946, issue of Life magazine featured a full-page image of his Christmas tree, decorated with 15th and 16th century saints, a Christ child, and 18th century hand-blown glass balls. The other four units were occupied by five of Amster's friends or associates: Dwight Deere Wiman, Mr. and Mrs. W. W. Whitall, Leonard Hanna, and Billy Baldwin. Hanna installed a small elevator in his apartment before moving in.

In the decade after its completion, numerous additional tenants signed leases at Amster Yard. For instance, interior designer John Gerald signed a lease for space in 1951, and shipbuilding firm Gibbs Corporation leased space in 1958. Salvatore N. Schaino filed plans to alter the offices of James Amster Associates in June 1958 at a cost of $3,000. The courtyard itself became a popular local meeting place, with several parties, formal events, and community organization meetings being held there. The events held in the yard included fundraisers, Easter floral shows, and displays of antiques. During the 1960s, Turtle Bay residents gathered in the courtyard for Christmas carols, then marched around the streets, singing. The practice stopped after residents of the nearby Turtle Bay Gardens complained about one such gathering, attended by over four hundred people.

=== Late 20th century ===
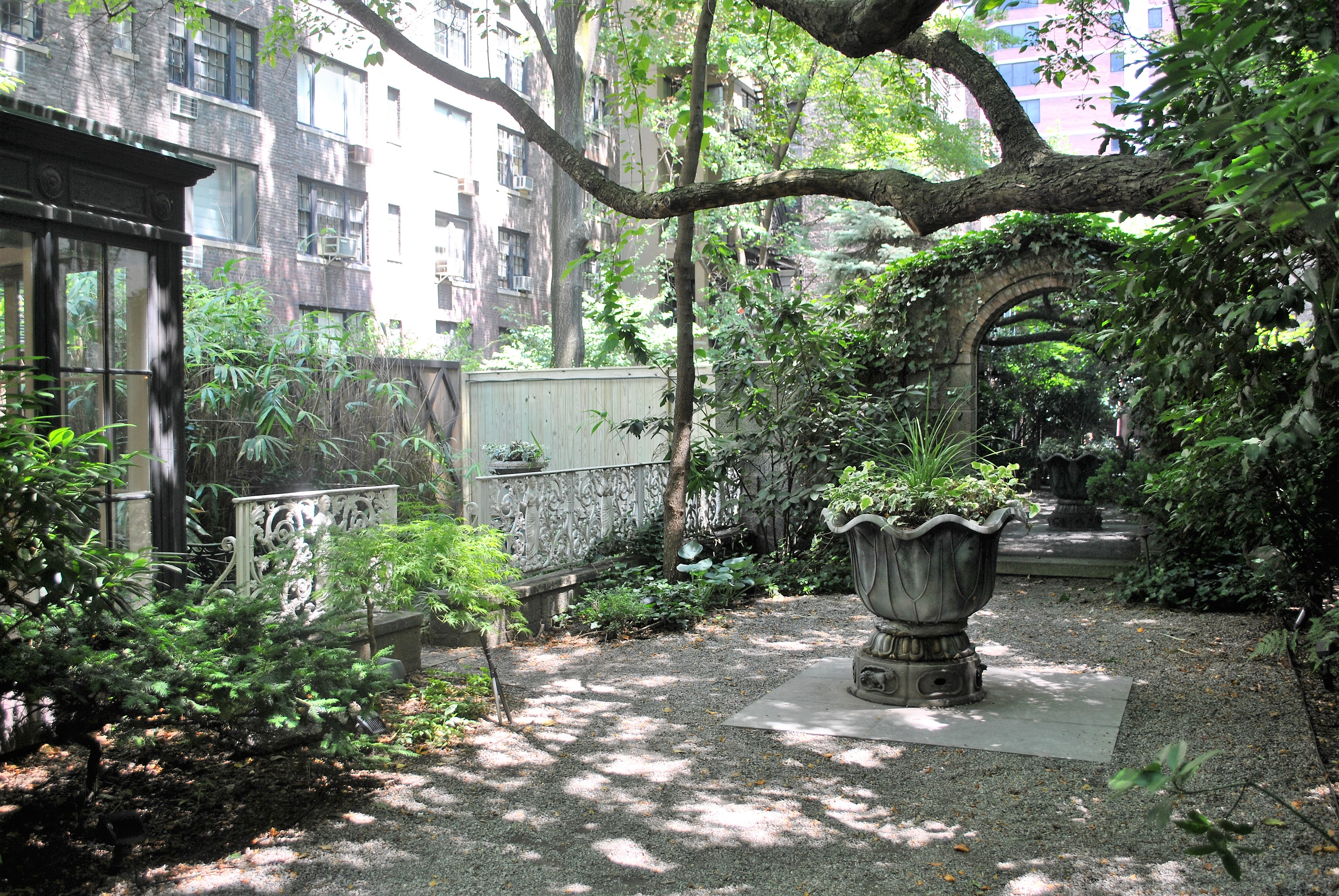
The mirror framed by an arch in Amster Yard

In April 1966, the New York City Landmarks Preservation Commission (LPC) nominated Amster Yard for city landmark status. Later that year, the LPC designated the yard and its surrounding buildings as a city landmark, citing the yard's character and its history as a stagecoach stop. Amster celebrated the designation by hosting a party in the yard and inviting friends and neighbors, including fashion designers Norman Norell and John Moore as well as the wife of Oscar Hammerstein II. Amster subsequently sold some air rights to Laird Properties, which built an adjacent office tower in 1970; he received $500,000 from the sale, part of which was set aside for a maintenance fund for Amster Yard. When the adjacent 31-story office tower at 805 Third Avenue was constructed in the early 1980s, the developers of the office tower created a facade of white stone and brown brick adjacent to the yard, as was required under LPC regulations. The office tower also used some of the unused air rights over Amster Yard, in exchange for a monthly check sent to Amster.

During the last decades of the 20th century, Amster Yard contained two residential tenants and several advertising firms. Occupants included the household furnishing firm SwidPowell, which moved into Amster Yard in 1982. James Amster was in a long-lasting relationship with Robert K. Moyer, and journalist and friend Mike Wallace described them in 1995 as "a wonderful old married couple". Amster died of leukemia in 1986. Afterward, the yard began to lose much of its appeal as a residential enclave. Moyer continued to live at Amster Yard until 1992, when he was the last tenant to move out. Amster Yard hosted several commercial occupants, including the advertising agency McCann Amster Yard, a subsidiary of McCann-Erickson Worldwide. The courtyard was still mostly closed to the public, and visitors had to press a buzzer to enter the courtyard.

By 1998, the five properties and the courtyard proper were being foreclosed upon. Praedium Two Fund, subsidiary of Credit Suisse First Boston, had bought the site at a bankruptcy sale that February. Amster Yard was covered by a $5.25 million note, but that had fallen into foreclosure, and Praedium had purchased it at $3.8 million, thirty percent less than the face value of the note. The owner gave all existing tenants until that July to leave; at the time, the buildings were in deteriorated shape, with leaky pipes. In real estate terms, the transaction was unusual because, for other similarly cheap properties, buyers usually renovated the property rather than evicting all the tenants. Amster Yard was acquired in May 1999 by the Instituto Cervantes New York, an agency of the Spanish government. The institute had purchased the buildings for $9 million, representing a 137 percent return for Praedium.

=== Instituto Cervantes renovation ===
Instituto Cervantes was planning to move from its space at Chanin Building, several blocks away, when it bought Amster Yard. Spanish officials initially projected that the property could be renovated for $2 million. However, the institute subsequently found severe structural issues in the yard's existing buildings, such as cracked walls and extremely thin brick walls. In July 2001, the Instituto Cervantes proposed to demolish the three buildings at the rear of the yard. The demolition was approved that October and the structures were largely demolished by that December. Preservationists and other parties expressed disappointment at the demolition, even as the institute planned to restore the structures. Michael J. Lewis, writing for The New York Times, stated, "critics point out that the result will be a vapid replica". The New York Landmarks Conservancy held an easement that allowed it to review proposed changes to the yard, but the conservancy had given its approval only for repairs. Turtle Bay residents also objected to the demolition, and Moyer said he "simply couldn't bear to walk by".

The yard was excavated for the construction of additional basement facilities for the institute. The project was conducted by architects Ad Hoc MSL and Victor Schwartz as well as general contractor Regele Builders. Replicas of the original structures had been built by 2003, with the contractors using archival photographs to approximate the original specifications. Some of the replicas had to use alternate materials, such as the shingled roof at the rear of the yard, which had to be rebuilt in lead-coated copper rather than the original asbestos. The interiors of the structures had been completely rebuilt. Moyer and some of Amster's longtime associates, who visited the yard in late 2003, stated that the replicas gave them memories of the original yard. On October 10, 2003, Instituto Cervantes was reopened by Spanish Crown Prince Felipe VI.

== See also ==
- List of New York City Designated Landmarks in Manhattan from 14th to 59th Streets
