= MacArthur Playground =

Public park in Manhattan, New York

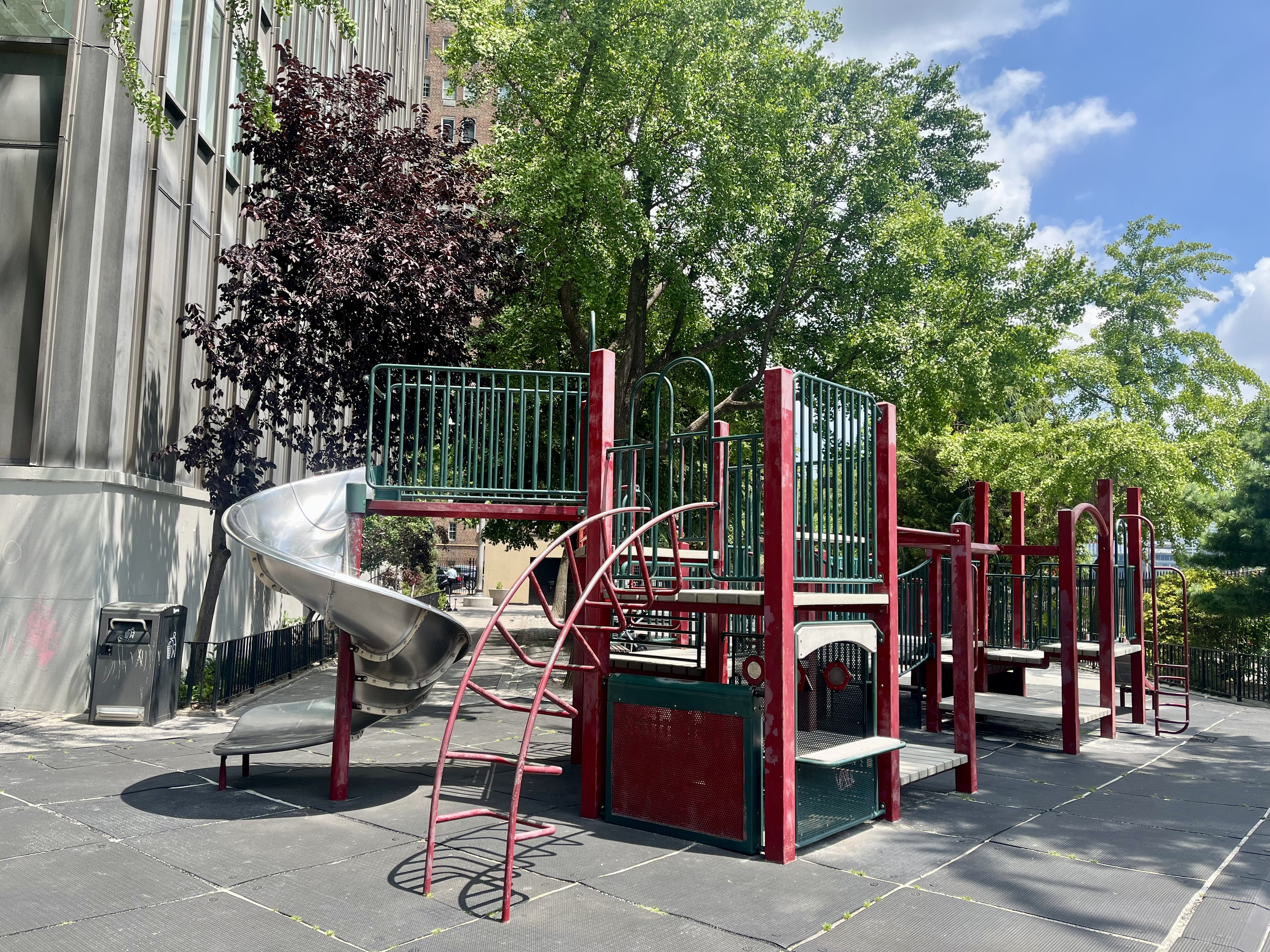
- MacArthur Playground in 2023
- Interactive map of MacArthur Playground
- Type: Urban park
- Location: Turtle Bay, Manhattan, New York, US
- Coordinates: 40°45′8″N 73°57′54″W
- Area: 0.33 acres (0.13 ha)
- Opened: February 28, 1966
- Operator: New York City Department of Parks and Recreation

MacArthur Playground, officially named General Douglas MacArthur Memorial Park, is a 0.33-acre (0.13 ha) public park in the Turtle Bay neighborhood of Manhattan, New York, United States. The park is located on the east end of the block bounded by First Avenue, General Douglas MacArthur Plaza, and East 48th and 49th streets, immediately to the north of the Headquarters of the United Nations. The park and plaza, the latter of which is a north–south street that runs for a single block between the playground and the FDR Drive, were named after Douglas MacArthur in October 1964. The park was donated to the city by Alcoa Plaza Associates, the developer of the adjacent mixed-use building at 860-870 United Nations Plaza.

== History ==
=== Redevelopment of site ===
In the late 1950s, Joseph I. Lubin planned to construct two apartment buildings on the block bounded by First Avenue, the FDR Drive, and East 48th and 49th streets. At that time, most of the block—including the current site of MacArthur Playground—was occupied by a parking lot. To improve vehicular access to the planned development, Lubin proposed constructing a bridge from the top of the retaining wall at the south end of Beekman Place across East 49th Street to an elevated plaza located between the apartment buildings. The proposed bridge was met by strong opposition from local residents, who did not want more traffic drawn to Beekman Place, a narrow two-block-long street. The New York City Planning Commission also did not support the proposal because the bridge would only serve a private interest. The application for the bridge was withdrawn by Lubin in February 1958.

Lubin later sold the property to Webb & Knapp, which announced plans to develop the site with a mixed-use building that would provide office space designed for United Nations delegations along with residential units on the top floors, with the first choices for apartments going to diplomats. As part of the plans for the building, the developer would give the city a third of an acre at the end of the block for park uses. The new plans for the site also met opposition from local residents, who questioned the scale of the proposed 37-story tower and that a requested change to the zoning would only benefit the developer. In 1961, the plans for the building were revised from a single tower to shorter twin towers to appease residents living near Beekman Place.

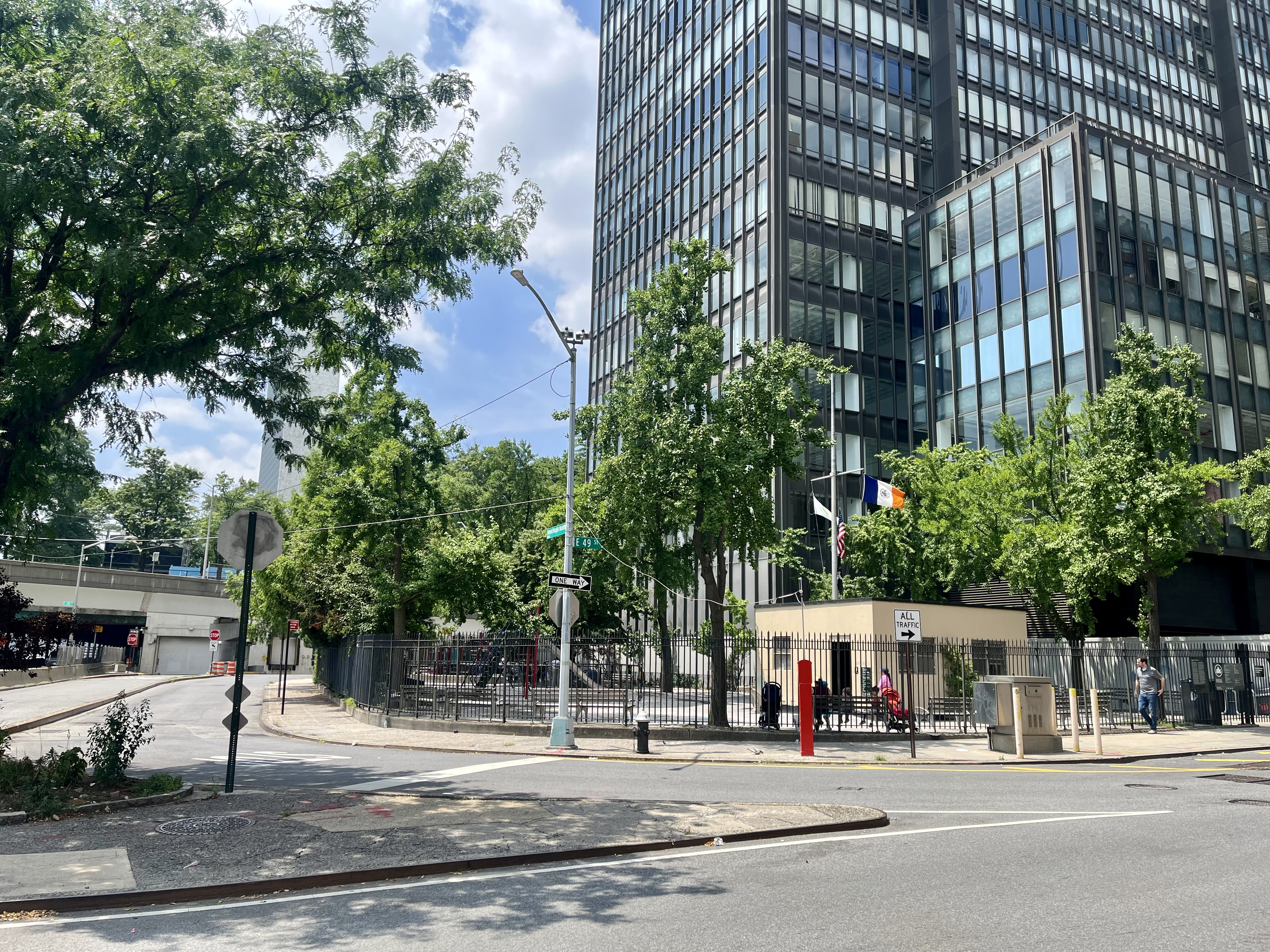
The park and plaza named after MacArthur are located on the east side of 860-870 United Nations Plaza

Local residents and neighborhood associations still expressed concerns over the amount of traffic that the project would generate and requested that the City Planning Commission instead rezone the block from commercial to residential so that the existing apartment building at the southeast corner of First Avenue and East 49th Street could remain and the rest of the block could be redeveloped as a park with an underground parking garage. However, construction of the new buildings began in June 1963. The development was sponsored by the Alcoa Plaza Associates, a joint venture that included the Aluminum Company of America (Alcoa) as a partner.

=== Establishment of park ===
In October 1964, the New York City Council voted to name the park on the east side of the new building as "General Douglas MacArthur Memorial Park" and the one-block-long street located between the east side of the park and the FDR Drive as "General Douglas MacArthur Plaza." The park and plaza were formally dedicated on January 27, 1965, in a ceremony attended by Jean MacArthur, the widow of General Douglas MacArthur, and City Councilmember Theodore R. Kupferman. The new parkland was added to the city map in January 1966. Constructed by Alcoa Plaza Associates, the park was donated to the city following its completion. It opened under the jurisdiction of the New York City Department of Parks and Recreation on February 28, 1966.

=== Renovations ===
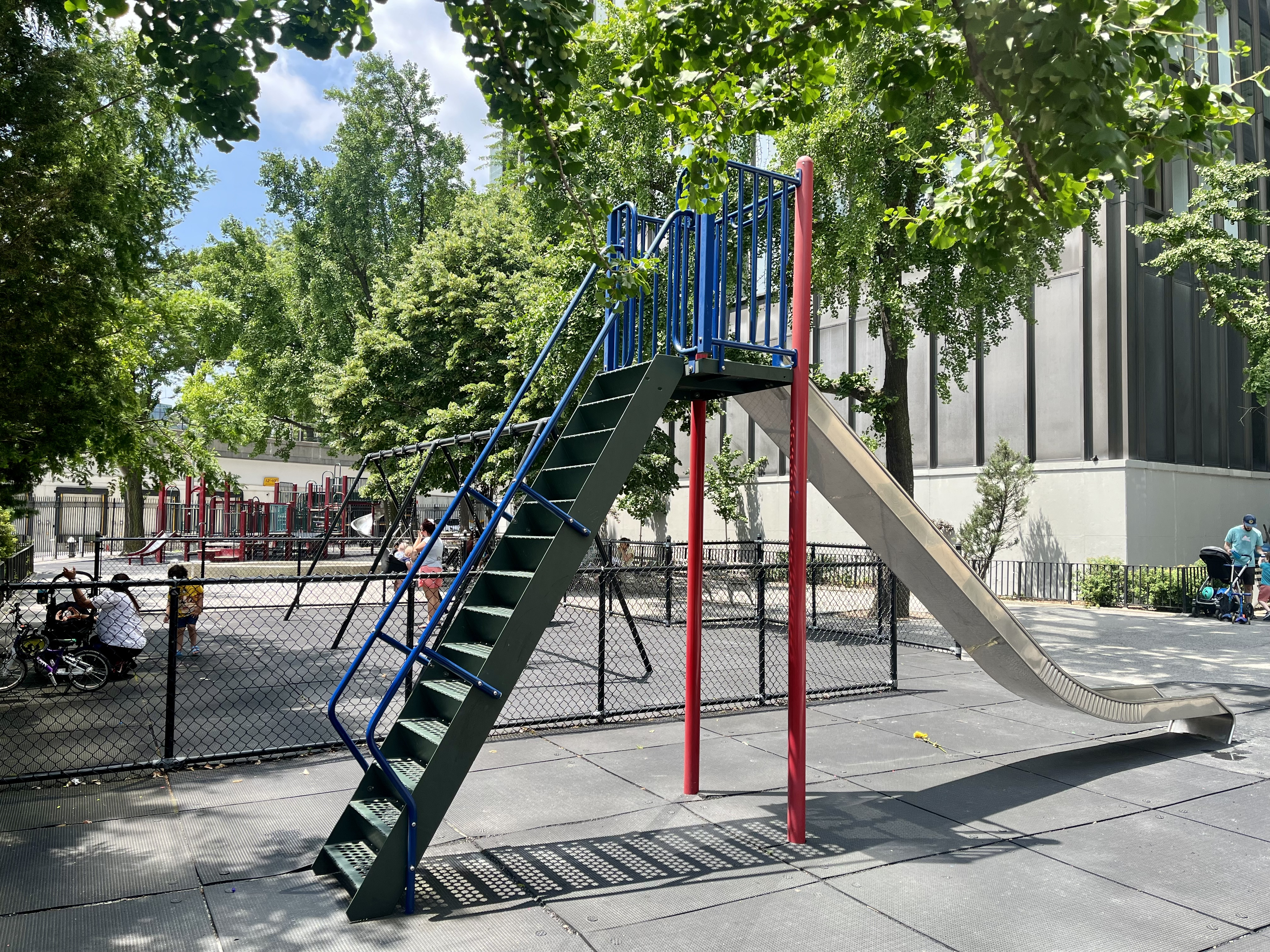
Slides and swings were added as part of renovations made in 2008

During the early 1990s, the park had fallen into disrepair and also had become overrun by drug users, homeless and vagrants. A group of local parents started a grassroots campaign to raise funds in an effort to renovate the playground equipment and pay for security to keep the park safe. They raised $20,000 in private donations and also received a matching grant of $20,000 from the City Parks Foundation. The revitalization effort was also assisted by efforts of the Turtle Bay Association and the support of local businesses, schools, and tenant associations. A ribbon-cutting ceremony was held on June 6, 1995, to celebrate the completion of the renovations to the park, which included modern modular playground equipment. Additional renovations were made to the park in 2008, which included the installation of new fencing, landscaping, pavement, slides and swings.
