= Fred F. French Building =

Office skyscraper in Manhattan, New York

- U.S. National Register of Historic Places
- New York State Register of Historic Places
- New York City Landmark
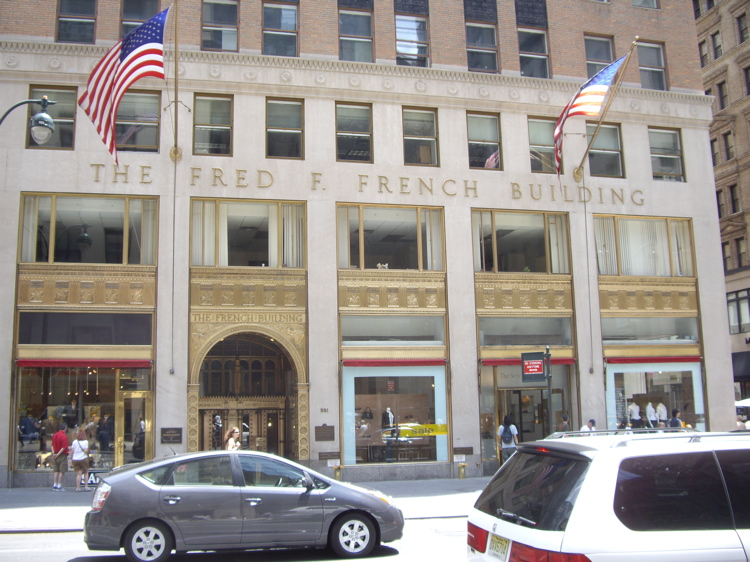
- Location: 551 Fifth Avenue, Manhattan, New York City
- Coordinates: 40°45′19″N 73°58′44″W
- Built: 1927
- Architect: H. Douglas Ives and Sloan & Robertson
- Architectural style: Art Deco
- NRHP reference No.: 03001514
- NYSRHP No.: 06101.012742
- NYCL No.: 1415, 1416

Significant dates
- Added to NRHP: January 28, 2004
- Designated NYSRHP: December 3, 2003
- Designated NYCL: March 18, 1986

The Fred F. French Building is a skyscraper at 551 Fifth Avenue on the northeast corner with 45th Street in Midtown Manhattan, New York City. Designed by H. Douglas Ives along with John Sloan and T. Markoe Robertson of the firm Sloan & Robertson, it was erected in 1927. The building is named for Fred F. French, owner of the Fred F. French Companies, for whom the structure was commissioned.

The 38-story building is designed in the Art Deco style, with Middle Eastern influences, and contains numerous setbacks as mandated by the 1916 Zoning Resolution. The facade is mostly designed with brick walls and limestone trim. The base of the facade is ornamented with two bronze entrances and multiple mythological figures, while the top contains a "tower" with Mesopotamian style bas-reliefs and faience tiles. Other multicolored details such as ornamental friezes ornament the facade. The Middle Eastern design motifs are also used in the lobby, which contains a polychrome vaulted ceiling.

The Fred F. French Building has approximately 430,000 square feet (40,000 m^{2}) for rent and is owned by The Feil Organization. It was the tallest building on Fifth Avenue as well as one of the most desired addresses on the avenue upon its completion. By the 1990s, it underwent a complete restoration, subsequently earning the Building Owners and Managers Association's 1994/1995 Historic Building of the Year Award. The Fred F. French Building and its interior became New York City designated landmarks in 1986, and the building was added to the National Register of Historic Places in 2004.

== Site ==
The Fred F. French Building is at the northeast corner of Fifth Avenue and 45th Street in Midtown Manhattan, New York City. Its plot is largely rectangular but has a small cutout on the northwestern portion. The building adjoins a 20-story building at 553 Fifth Avenue, which is L-shaped and occupies the cutout, as well as a nine-story building at 9 East 45th Street. The building is assigned its own ZIP Code, 10176; it was one of 41 buildings in Manhattan that had their own ZIP Codes as of 2019.

== Architecture ==
The Fred F. French Building was designed by H. Douglas Ives with Sloan & Robertson in the Art Deco style and completed in 1927. The building is named for Fred F. French, the head of the French Companies, whose other projects in the city included Tudor City and Knickerbocker Village. The Fred F. French Building rises 38 stories, rising 426 feet (130 m) tall, and contains several setbacks on all sides as mandated under the 1916 Zoning Resolution. It was one of the first few skyscrapers to be built with a mostly rectangular plan; previous buildings had been erected with largely square plans.

The Fred F. French Building was described by architectural writer Carol Herselle Krinsky as the "only Mesopotamian skyscraper" in New York City. Ives wrote that the building's colorful design took after Middle Eastern architectural features such as ziggurats. The colors used in the Fred F. French Building's facade were intended to evoke that of the Tower of Babel. At the time of the building's development, there was large interest in Ancient Egypt and the Ancient Near East, and other contemporary structures such as the Chrysler Building, Rockefeller Center, and 2 Park Avenue incorporated elements of ancient Egyptian and Near Eastern architecture. Furthermore, modern building codes prevented the inclusion of cornices and other decorative elements that projected more than 18 inches (460 mm) from the facade, as had been standard in older buildings. Because of the different influences, Ives said he felt "somewhat at a loss" when asked to describe the building's design.

=== Form and facade ===
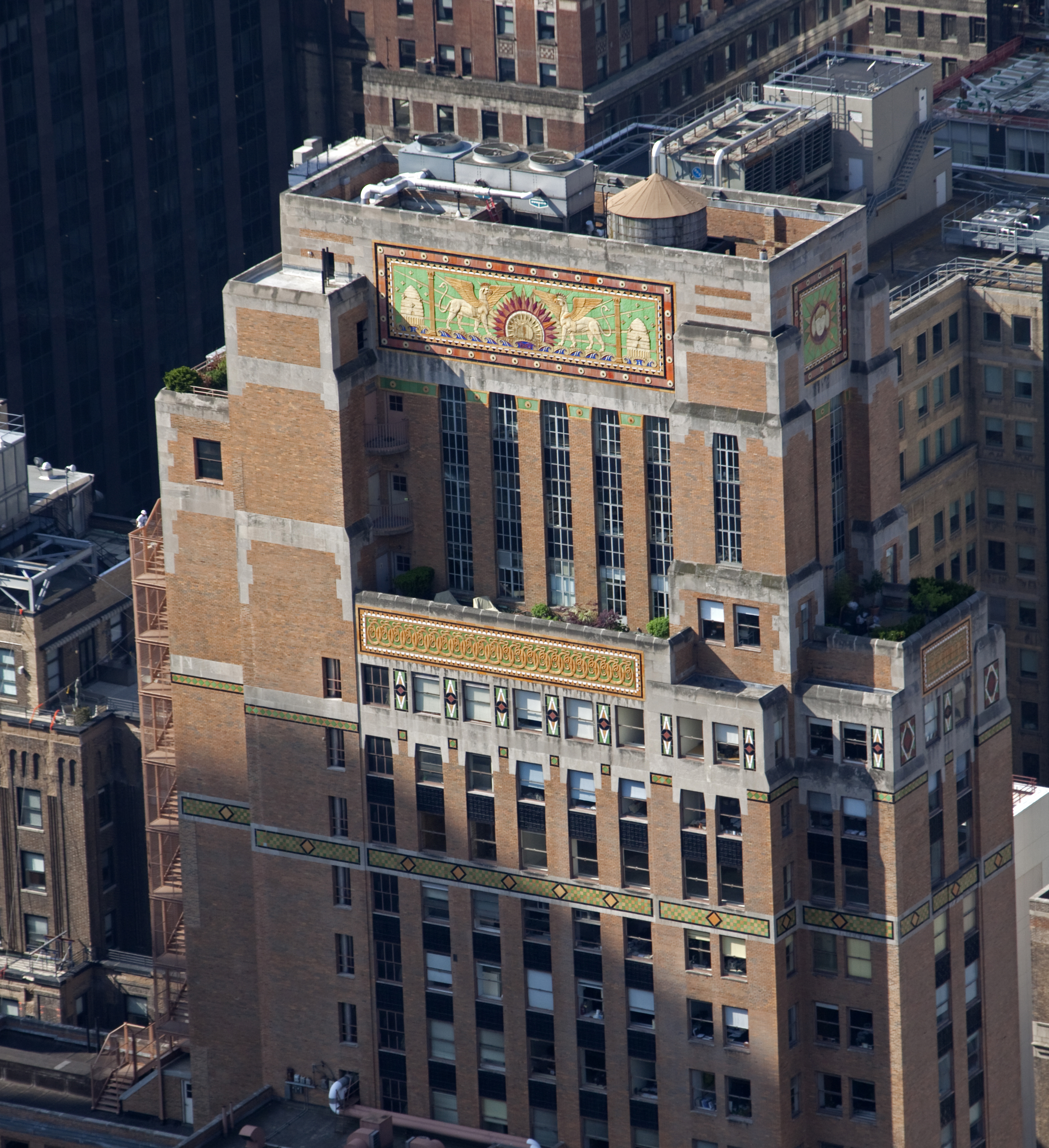
Setback detail

The Fred F. French Building's official address is 551 Fifth Avenue, The building was designed with profit as the main consideration, so the shorter side along Fifth Avenue was intended for highly valuable retail space. The building is one of the few remaining towers which maintains its entrance on 5th Avenue The building consists of a base spanning the 1st to 3rd stories; a midsection from the 4th to the 19th floors, with multiple setbacks; and a rectangular "tower" that is capped by a three-story penthouse above the 35th floor. Each of the four primary elevations of the facade has a different massing. The northern and eastern elevations face other buildings, but the southern and western elevations face 45th Street and Fifth Avenue respectively.

The Fred F. French Building's Middle Eastern decoration was intended to be colorful and noticeable from afar, rather than historically accurate. The facade is accented with terracotta bands of various colors including hues of red and black.

==== Base ====
On Fifth Avenue and on 45th Street, the first story is topped by a bronze frieze that contains depictions of winged beasts and stylized glyphs. The second story contains steel-framed tripartite windows above the friezes. The entrances are set within bronze arches, which contain coffered piers; symbols of architecture and industry in their spandrels; and bronze letters reading the french building above each arch. Above the second story, on both Fifth Avenue and 45th Street, are limestone friezes reading the fred f. french building. Flagpoles project from the second story in the second and fifth bays from the north on Fifth Avenue. The third story, on both Fifth Avenue and 45th Street, contains two slightly recessed one-over-one sash windows in each bay. A cornice runs above the third floor.

The base of the facade on Fifth Avenue is divided into five bays by double-story limestone piers. The entrance on Fifth Avenue, in the second bay from north, contains an outer vestibule under the arch, outside the entrance doors. The vestibule's ceiling consists of a depressed barrel vault with a bronze and crystal chandelier, as well as painted stepped corners and bas-relief polychrome beasts. The vestibule has an Italian travertine floor with beige stone lozenges, black and white marble triangles, and brass strips. The sides of the vestibule have bronze display windows, and the vestibule has two bronze revolving doors, topped by inscribed panels with the building's name and address. Historically, the northernmost bay had a glass storefront and granite water table at ground level, which was later replaced. The other three bays on Fifth Avenue also have replacement glass storefronts and water tables.

The base of the facade on 45th Street is divided into twelve bays by double-story limestone piers. The main entrance is in the eighth bay from the west and contains an arched vestibule. The vestibule is enclosed behind double glass doors and a bronze-and-glass transom. Its design is the same as that of the outer vestibule of the Fifth Avenue entrance. The decorations include bearded genies and 25 panels depicting Mesopotamian women. The other eleven bays on 45th Street contain glass storefronts and water tables in various conditions.

==== Upper stories ====
The 4th through 19th stories comprise the midsection of the building and are clad with russet colored brick. The 4th through 11th floors rise directly from the lot lines before setting back at various depths. The setbacks are decorated with limestone-trimmed friezes containing black ornament. Limestone windowsills were used on the facades facing the street, and precast concrete was used above setbacks at places where these windows could not be seen from street level. The windows on these stories are all sash windows, two per bay on each floor. The capitals of the piers are clad in light green faience with small rosettes.

The 20th through 38th stories comprise the "tower" of the building. The setbacks atop the tower are more gradual from the northern and southern elevations, while the eastern and western elevations set back more abruptly to the penthouse. The tower section measures only two bays wide on its western and eastern elevations. An orange-and-green belt course of faience tiles runs above the 31st floor.

Near the top of the building, there are faience panels with sunburst designs on the north and south elevations, with red, orange, gold, and green tiles. The sunburst designs were used to symbolize progress, while winged griffons depicting integrity and watchfulness flank each sunburst. Two beehives, each surrounded by five bees, separate the sunbursts and griffins. The narrower west and east elevations contain mosaic depictions of Mercury, the Roman god of trade. Faience spandrels and an orange-and-green frieze depicting serpents are placed above the 38th floor. The windows of the penthouse are arranged in several configurations. A metal fire escape runs along the eastern elevation. Atop the penthouse is a flat roof with a water tower. The use of a flat roof deviated from previous Art Deco designs, which typically had stepped pinnacles. The rooftop water tower contains bas reliefs on green background surrounded by a frame of red faience. At night, the building's pinnacle was illuminated.

=== Features ===
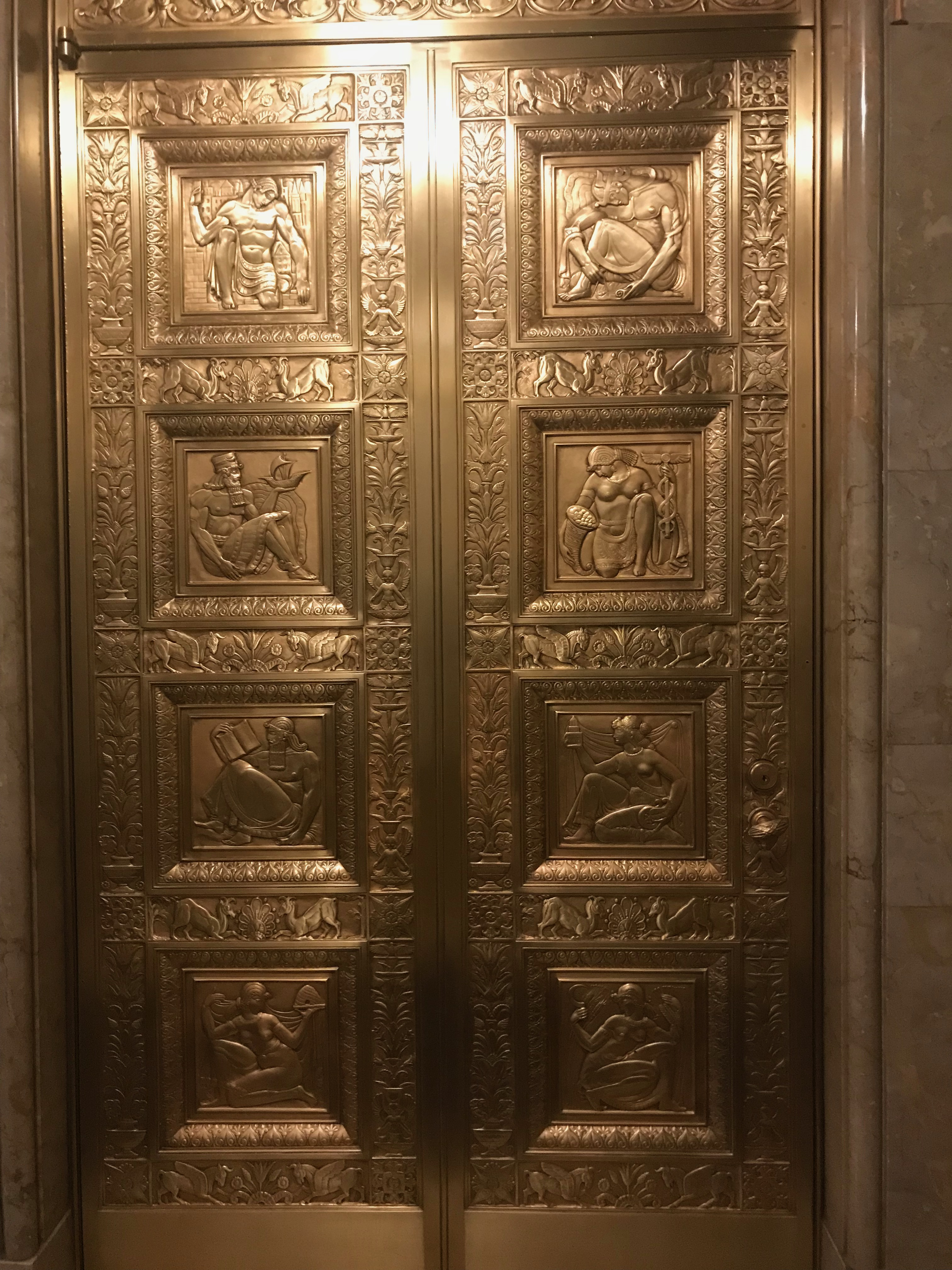
Gilt double-leaf door of an elevator in the lobby

The Fred F. French Building contained the most up-to-date designs and machinery when it was completed. Its innovations included an electric plumbing system, automatic elevators, and lighting and ventilation systems that could be "conveniently controlled", as described in the French Companies' magazine The Voice. The building also contains bronze ornamental work created by Russian-American artist Vincent Glinsky.

The building has eleven elevators. Ten of these run from the lobby and are separated into two banks of five units each. One bank serves all stories from the 1st to 16th floors, while the other runs nonstop from the lobby to the 17th floor, serving all floors through the 35th. From the 35th floor, a single elevator rises to the 38th story. Additionally, two stairways connect each of the floors. From the building's completion, the elevators were semi-automatically operated Otis cabs, one of the first such installations in the city. Elevator operators were retained only to push buttons for certain floors upon passengers' request and to bypass floors when the cabs were full.

==== Lobby ====
The first-floor lobby is L-shaped and consists of a longer wing extending west from the elevator lobby to Fifth Avenue, as well as a shorter corridor to the 45th Street entrance vestibule. The lobby walls are clad with marble. The lobby contains decorative details such as chevrons, palmettes, volutes, merlons, and lotus flowers as well as representations of animals such as lions and winged bulls. The passageway from 45th Street is wider because the main entrance is on that side.

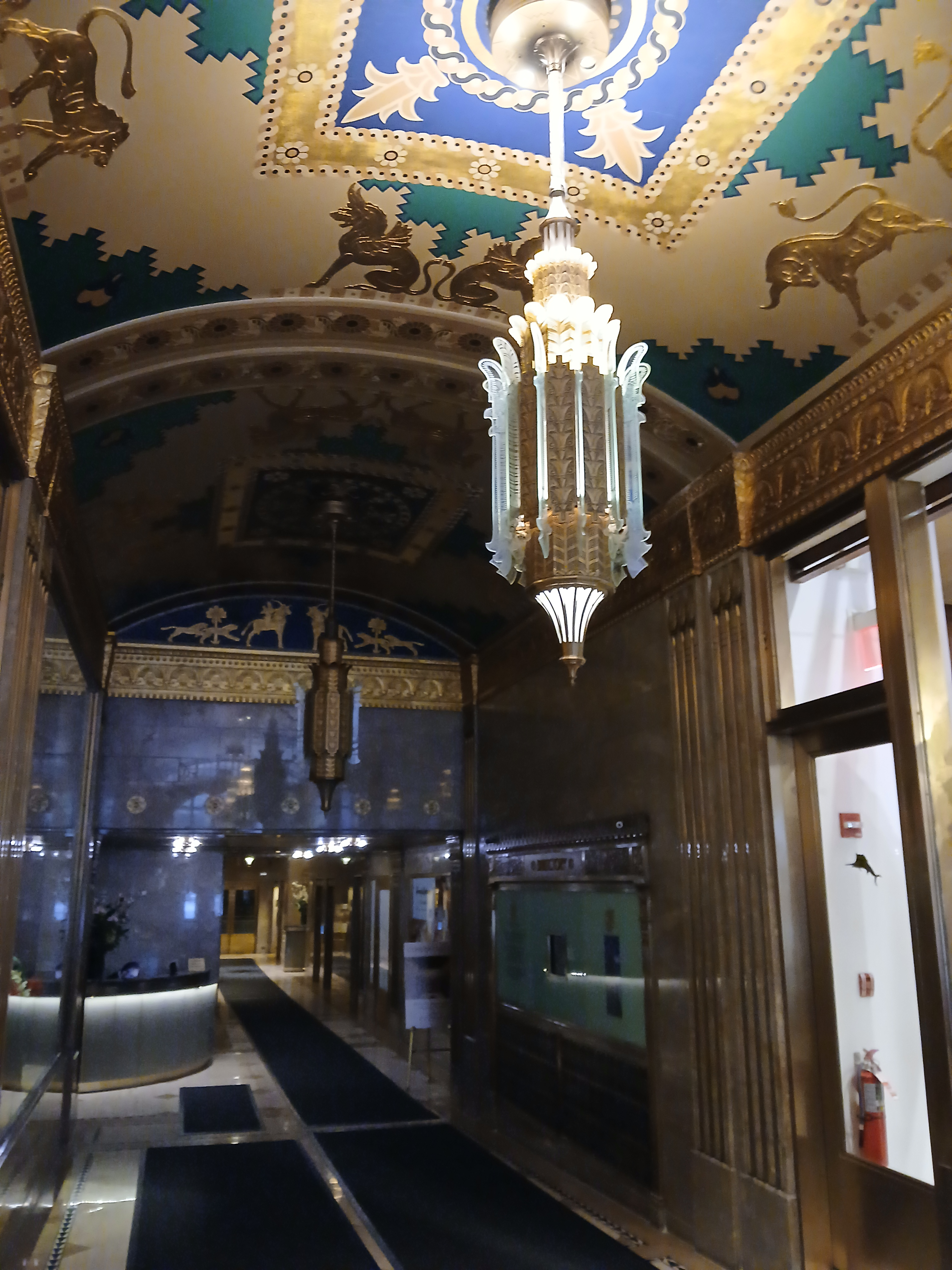
The passageway from Fifth Avenue

The passageway from Fifth Avenue is narrower and is divided by pilasters into several bays, each of which contains a multicolored vault with beasts and patterns. A gilded plaster frieze runs near the top of the wall. The revolving doors from Fifth Avenue are flanked by capitals with double bulls' heads, inspired by those that were originally in the Palace of Darius in Susa. The design of the Fifth Avenue corridor was intended to draw visitors from the entrance to the elevator hall, and it also concealed the slight downward slope that existed between the Fifth Avenue and 45th Street entrances.

The elevator lobby contains several decorative bronze elements. The walls have three tenant-directory boards with ornamental bronze frames. The gilt-bronze double-leaf elevator doors in the lobby modeled in low relief by metallurgist Oscar Bach each have eight panels (four on each leaf) depicting sectors in which Fred French had businesses, including industry, commerce, finance, and building. Eight bronze chandeliers are present in the lobby, which contain inscriptions indicating the floors served by the adjacent elevators. Also in the lobby are five gilt-bronze doors leading to offices, with similar designs to the elevator doors, as well as three gilt-bronze doors of simpler design. An Assyrian Revival mailbox is mounted on the wall between the two elevator banks; the mailbox contains a depiction of a bald eagle, the symbol of the United States Post Office, as well as two winged griffins.

==== Upper stories ====
The building has approximately 430,000 square feet (40,000 m^{2}) for rent. The upper stories have different floor areas and shapes, and the higher floors had smaller areas because of the setbacks on the exterior. The 2nd through 11th stories had 16,000 square feet (1,500 m^{2}) per floor; the 29th through 35th stories in the tower have 4,000 square feet (370 m^{2}) per floor; and the penthouse has 2,400 square feet (220 m^{2}) per floor. The stories of the base have a floor plan that is clustered around a largely L-shaped passageway. The upper floors have passageways in various layouts to reflect the different shapes and sizes of each story. Usually, on stories where a tenant rented an entire floor, the layout of that floor contained an open plan.

Unlike the lobby, the office stories were not decorated in the Mesopotamian style and were instead designed to tenants' specifications. Some floors still contain their original furnishings, including mail chutes made of glass and bronze, as well as room-number signs and elevator floor indicators made of bronze. The interiors were originally finished with a marble molding at the baseboard, as well as wooden doorways and doors. Tenants modified the interiors on some floors with a myriad of designs, although some modern finishes were placed on top of the original furnishings. The remodeled floors contain finishes made of carpet, stone tiles, plastic tiles, or wood floors. The remodeled walls are made of sheetrock or paper, and they have baseboards made of plastic, stone, or wood. Dropped ceilings are used in almost all locations where the interiors were remodeled.

On the 12th and 13th floors were the French Companies' offices, designed in the Tudor style, an allusion to the design of Tudor City. The 12th floor remains largely intact but some of these finishes were changed after the Fred F. French Company moved out during the 1980s. The 12th-floor elevator lobby contains green carpets, stone walls, a decorative plaster coffered ceiling, and marble baseboards and door surrounds. A circular stair west of the elevators leads to the 13th floor and contains green marble risers, black stone steps, and a handrail and balustrade made of bronze. From the elevator lobby, a doorway leads to a rectangular reception hall with predominantly green and white designs; the walls and ceiling are similar to the elevator lobby, but the tile floors and baseboards are made of black marble. An I-shaped reception area for the Fred F. French Company is to the east of the reception hall and contains wooden decorative elements and black marble floors. A conference room with wood decorations is south of the reception hall. A corridor with wood decorations and dropped ceiling leads east of the reception hall and south of the French Company reception area. At the eastern end of the French Company reception area is the rectangular executive secretary's office, with cast ornamental details on the ceiling. Fred French's office was "reputed" to be in the L-shaped room north of the executive secretary's office and had similar decoration.

== History ==
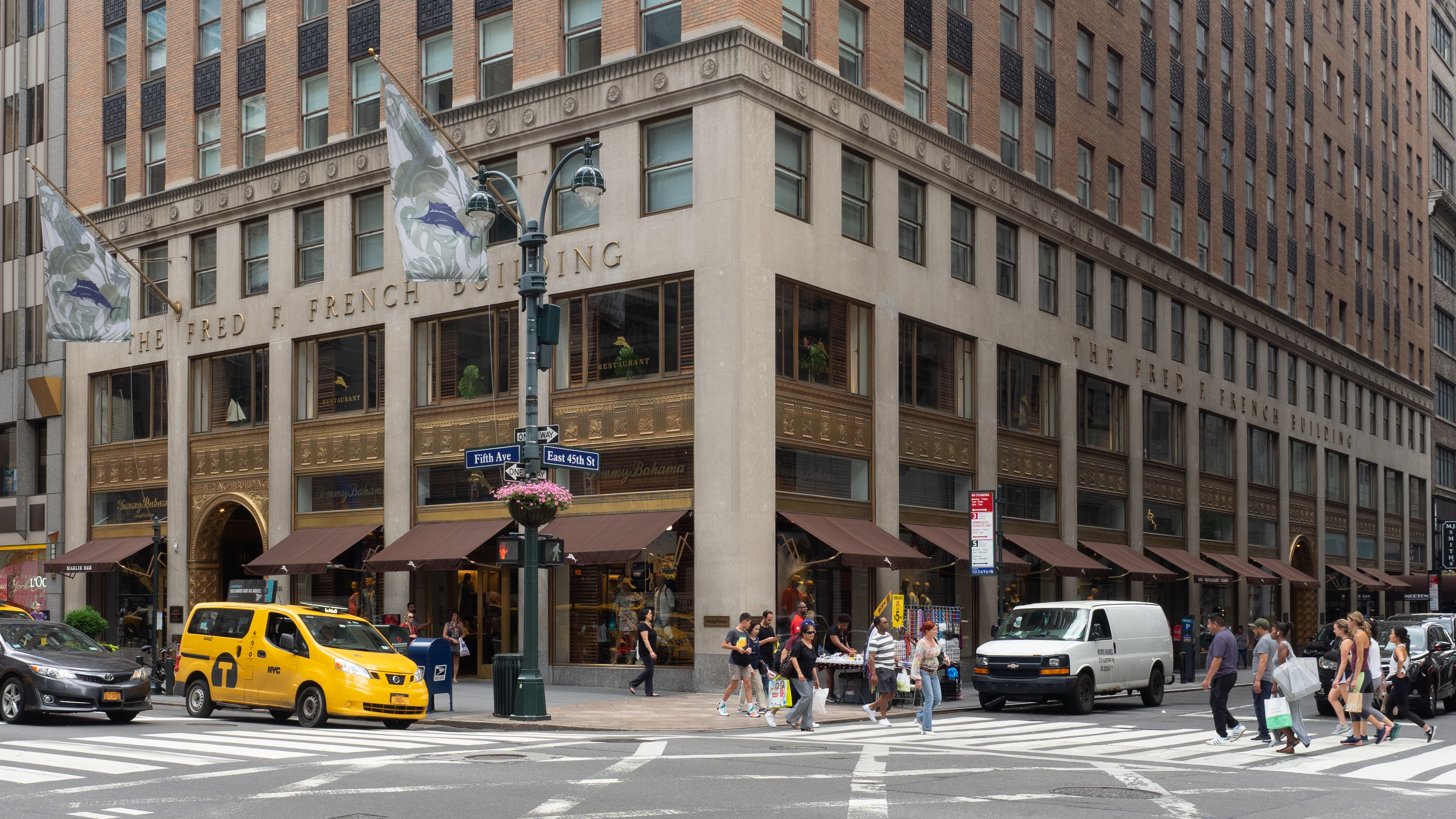
Base of the facade as seen from across the intersection of Fifth Avenue and 45th Street

Fifth Avenue was being developed with office and commercial buildings at the beginning of the 20th century. The completion of the underground Grand Central Terminal in 1913 resulted in the rapid development of Terminal City, the area around Grand Central, as well as a corresponding increase in real-estate prices. By the 1920s, Fifth Avenue was the most active area for development in Midtown, and developers were starting to build north of 45th Street, which had previously been considered the boundary for profitable developments. The most active year for construction in that decade was 1926, when thirty office buildings were constructed on Fifth Avenue. The two-block-wide area between Fifth and Park Avenues represented eight percent of Manhattan's land area, but it constituted twenty-five percent of developments that commenced in the borough between 1924 and 1926.

The French Companies was founded in 1910, and it built a 16-story headquarters at Madison Avenue and 41st Street in 1920. By the mid-1920s, the company was one of New York City's largest development firms, and it was looking for a new site for its headquarters. Among the French Companies' largest projects was the Tudor City apartment complex on the east side of Manhattan.

=== Construction ===
Fred French bought 19,000 square feet (1,800 m^{2}) at the northeast corner of Fifth Avenue and 45th Street in March 1925, with frontage of 200 feet (61 m) on 45th Street and 78.5 feet (23.9 m) on Fifth Avenue. He planned to build a 31-story office building for the French Companies' headquarters, with a banking hall on the lower stories. At the time, the site contained the Church of the Heavenly Rest, as well as four residential buildings and one office building. The land had cost an average of $285 per square foot ($3,070/m^{2}) (Note: Equivalent to $4,050/ft^{2} ($43,600/m^{2}) in 2024) significantly higher than their mid-19th century cost of $2.85/ft^{2} ($30.7/m^{2}), (Note: Equivalent to $79/ft^{2} ($850/m^{2}) in 2024.) but lower than the average cost of $300 per square foot ($3,200/m^{2}) for similar plots. (Note: When the project was announced, another source initially gave the land cost as being $250/ft^{2} ($2,700/m^{2}), equivalent to $3,553/ft^{2} ($38,240/m^{2}) in 2024. French later confirmed the higher figure of $285 per square foot.) The building at the corner, measuring 25 by 110 feet (7.6 by 33.5 m), alone had cost $300,000.

The French Companies obtained title to the site in May 1925. Sloan & Robertson filed preliminary plans for the Fred F. French Building that August. At the time, the building was expected to be completed in early 1927 at a cost of $10 million. The building would have risen 31 stories and 385 feet (117 m). A subsequent two-story addition was rejected because it did not fit zoning codes, which Sloan & Robertson appealed. Ultimately, the architects were granted a variance to construct a 38-story, 416.58-foot (127 m) building, the second tallest in the surrounding area, behind only H. Craig Severance's 432-foot (132 m) Harriman Building at 44th Street and Fifth Avenue. Final plans for the Fred F. French Building were filed in March 1926.

Construction on the Fred F. French Building commenced on May 22, 1926, and the steel frame was topped out within four months. In October 1926, a $4.5 million mortgage was placed on the building. For unknown reasons, the project was delayed by seven months, and it opened on October 24, 1927. Had the Fred F. French Building opened on time, it would have claimed the title of tallest building along Fifth Avenue, but ultimately it was the second-tallest behind the Harriman Building. The Fred F. French Building was the French Companies' first commercial building to be completed under the "French Plan", a company philosophy that prioritized small returns on large ventures, rather than large returns on small ventures. Furthermore, the Fred F. French Building was one of the first retail skyscrapers to be built on this section of Fifth Avenue.

=== Mid-20th century ===
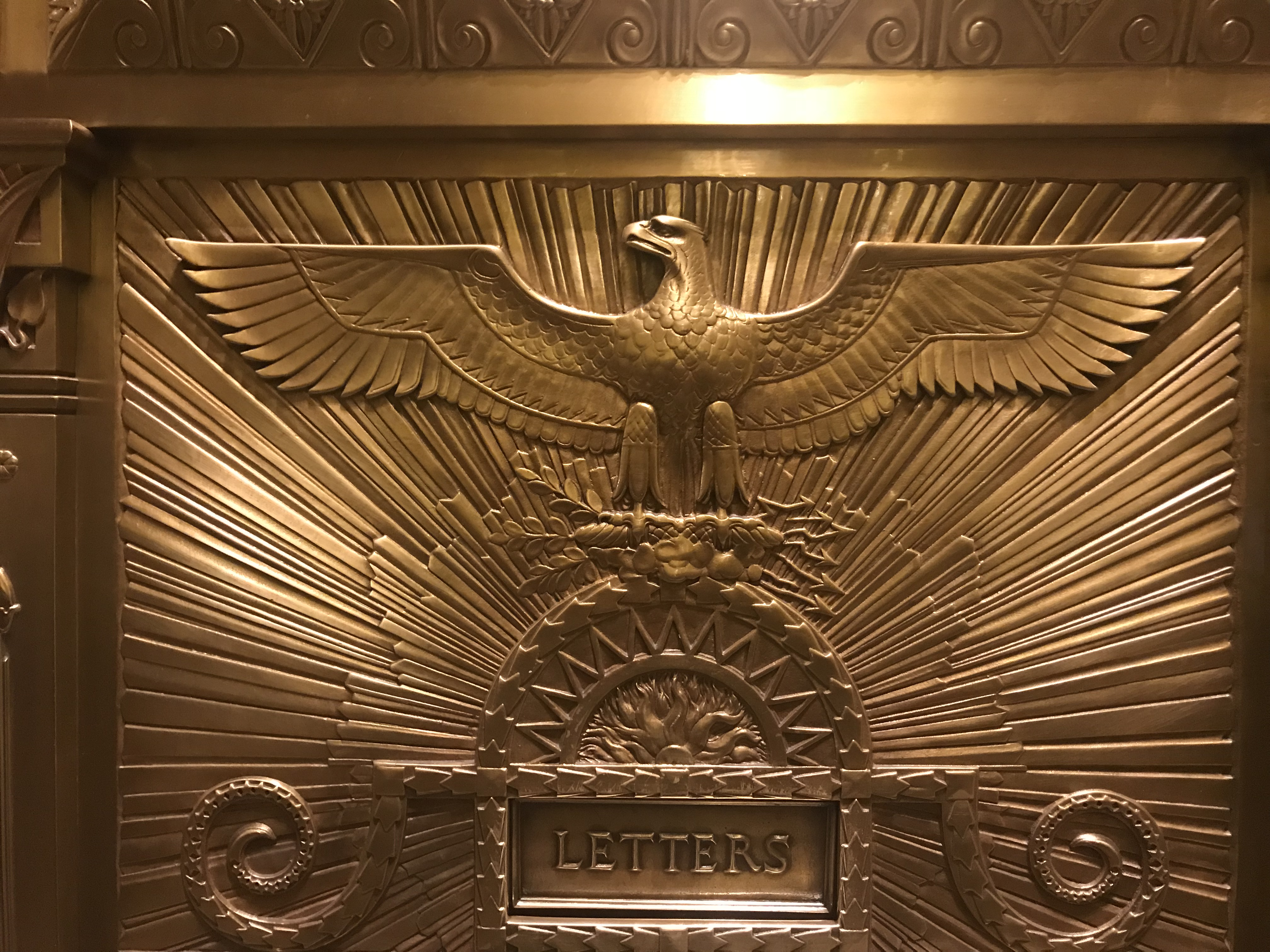
Gilt mailbox in lobby

The French Companies heavily marketed its new building in its magazine The Voice, and the building was quickly occupied. Among the earliest large tenants in the building were clothier Browning, King & Co.; real estate auctioneers William Kennelly Inc; luggage manufacturer Crouch & Fitzgerald; pulp and paper firm Perkins-Goodwin Company; a ticket office for the St. Paul Railroad; and the American Broadcasting Company. The ground-level space at the corner of Fifth Avenue and 45th Street used as a restaurant operated by Acker, Merral & Condit. Three years after the building's completion, H. Douglas Ives filed plans to turn the 36th and 37th floors of the penthouse into offices. The Fred F. French Building also saw several deaths in its early years, including the suicides of workers in the building, as well as the accidental crushing of an elevator repairman.

By 1934, the ground-floor corner space in the Fred F. French Building had become a French restaurant. During the mid-20th century, the Fred F. French Building gained other tenants such as diamond dealer Louis Roselaar, the John Simon Guggenheim Memorial Foundation, and the Brazilian government's trade bureau, as well as several advertising firms and three insurance companies. The ground-floor corner space became home to The Cattleman restaurant by 1967.

=== Late 20th and early 21st centuries ===
The building was purchased by financial services company MetLife in 1985, and the French Companies subsequently moved out. During the 1990s, the Fred F. French Building underwent a complete restoration. Although the faience panels were largely undamaged, the terracotta was replaced because of rust. The lobby was re-gilt and the ceiling was repainted; in addition, the elevators from the lobby were totally replaced. The renovation earned the Building Owners and Managers Association's 1994/1995 Historic Building of the Year Award. Pace University rented some space in the building for use as classrooms in 1997.

A group of investors led by The Feil Organization bought the Fred F. French Building for $128 million as part of a move by MetLife to sell off its real estate portfolio. The partnership included Lloyd Goldman and his family, as well as Stanley Chera. At the time, Morton's The Steakhouse was among the tenants in the Fred F. French Building, as was the British Tourist Authority. In 2012, retailer Tommy Bahama opened a three-story flagship store and restaurant in the Fred F. French Building. By the middle of that decade, the building had tenants such as Denihan Hospitality Group, ABM Industries, and law firm Kleinberg, Kaplan, Wolff & Cohen. During the 2020s, the building's tenants included a Tommy Bahama store and offices for the National Women's Soccer League.

== Reception and landmark designations ==
There was mixed commentary on the Fred F. French Building's design. George S. Chappell lamented the "rows of dreary factory windows" in The New Yorker, rhetorically commenting: "Can't the Fifth Avenue Association do something about this?" The WPA Guide to New York City described the faience panels as being "of questionable taste." Other criticism of the building was more positive. Paul Goldberger of The New York Times called the building one of the "best slab-shaped buildings of the 1920's". Upon its opening, the building was characterized as being "one of the most popular business palaces in the entire midtown section" because of its technologically advanced systems, central location, and elaborate decoration. The writer Elizabeth Macaulay-Lewis said in 2021 that the Fred F. French Building "embodies the eclectic nature of many Neo-Antique buildings".

The building's shape was also praised. According to the New York City Landmarks Preservation Commission (LPC), the Fred F. French Building so exactly conformed to the 1916 Zoning Resolution that it was illustrated in The American Heritage Dictionary of the English Language to accompany the definition of the word "setback". The AIA Guide to New York City characterized the building as being "from the days when even the greediest developer owed serious and intricate architectural detail and materials to the tenant and public". Robert A. M. Stern said that the Fred F. French Building "demonstrated that a slab could retain the iconic clarity of the skyscraper type and provide more rentable space per square foot of ground area". The Fred F. French Building's name also received notice; as the British broadcaster Alistair Cooke said, "It was marvelous that here a man should not only get his name on a building, but get his name with his middle initial on a building."

In the 1980s, a group of preservationists began surveying the city's buildings for possible sites that could be designated as interior landmarks by the LPC, with the Fred F. French Building's lobby being considered as one such landmark. The LPC designated the building and its lobby as city landmarks on March 18, 1986. In its report about the building's interior, the LPC described the building as having a "proto-Art Deco" design. The building was also listed on the National Register of Historic Places on January 28, 2004.

== See also ==
- Architecture of New York City
  - Art Deco architecture of New York City
- List of New York City Designated Landmarks in Manhattan from 14th to 59th Streets
- National Register of Historic Places listings in Manhattan from 14th to 59th Streets
