= Fred F. French =

American businessman (1883–1936)

Frederick Fillmore French
- Born: October 14, 1883; Manhattan, New York
- Died: August 30, 1936 (aged 52); Pawling, New York
- Education: Horace Mann School, Columbia University
- Occupation: Real estate developer
- Known for: Tudor City; Knickerbocker Village; Fred F. French Building
- Spouse: Cordelia W. French
- Children: 4

Frederick Fillmore French (October 14, 1883 – August 30, 1936) was a real estate developer active primarily in New York City. His largest developments include the Fred F. French Building, Tudor City, and Knickerbocker Village. He also designed and built the Everglades Hotel in Miami.

== Biography ==
Born in Manhattan, New York City, on October 14, 1883, French initially lived at East 86th Street on the Upper East Side. His middle name, Fillmore, honored his great-uncle on his mother's side, President Millard Fillmore. He grew up at East 162nd Street in Melrose, Bronx and attended the Horace Mann High School through a Pulitzer scholarship. Although French's mother was a college graduate, his father was a poor cigar maker who died when French was young. French was the oldest of four siblings and, in his youth, supported his family by taking part-time jobs.

After graduating high school, French went to Princeton University for one year before moving to Mexico "for a taste of ranching". In 1905, he returned to New York City and started taking engineering classes at Columbia University.

== Career ==
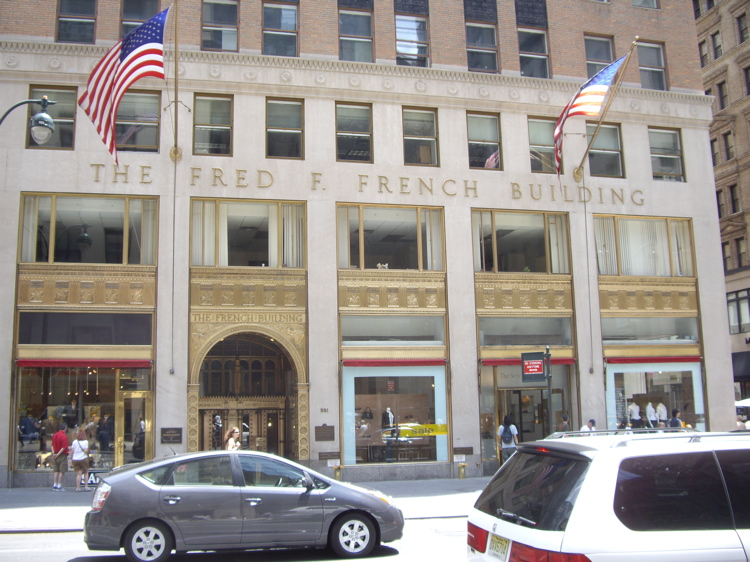
Fred F. French Building

French founded the Fred F. French Companies in 1910, aged 27, with one boy on his payroll and a $15 per week salary for himself. French's first purchase was his Bronx house. French prospered in spite of a "betrayal by his first partner", and in 1920, took out a loan to build a 16-story building at 41st Street and Madison Avenue in Midtown Manhattan. By the early 1920s, French's former Columbia professor and some of his early employers were working for him. In 1925, the French Companies commissioned the Fred F. French Building at Fifth Avenue and 45th Street as its new headquarters. At the time of the French Building's 1927 completion, the company was involved in at least $90 million worth of investments.

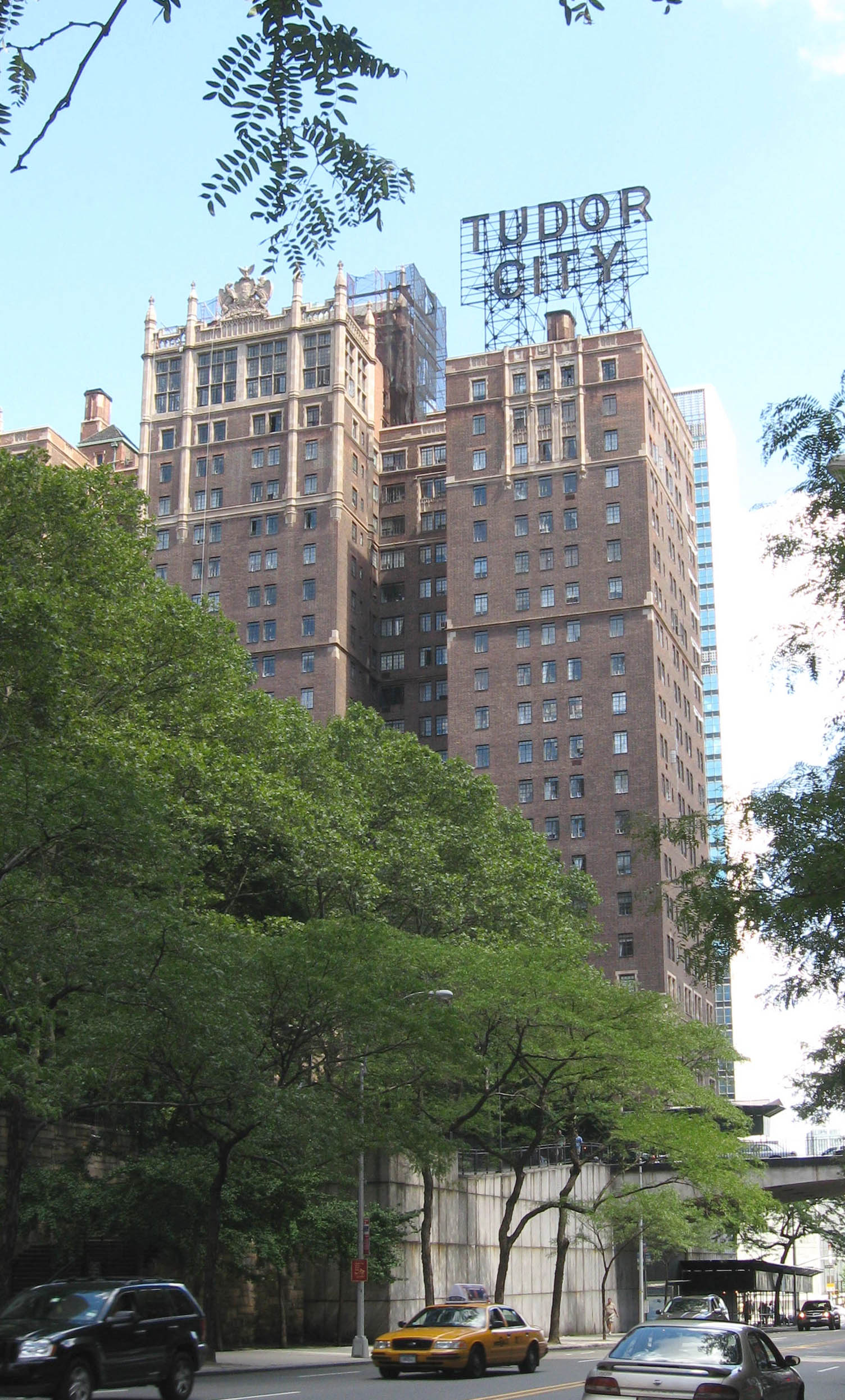
Tudor City

French built Tudor City, a housing development on Manhattan's East Side, for the rising middle class in the 1920s. Early the following decade, he also developed Knickerbocker Village, middle-class housing on the Lower East Side between the Brooklyn Bridge and the Manhattan Bridge. His original intention for the project was to build housing for "junior Wall Street executives". Knickerbocker Village was important in the history of landlord–tenant law. When the tenants were to take possession of their apartments, they found conditions to be unlivable. The tenants formed the Knickerbocker Village Tenants Association and started a strike, withholding their rent checks until their grievances were dealt with. The conflict that arose from the tenants' dissatisfaction led to New York City's rent control laws.

French was reportedly most interested in his work, and he supposedly had few acquaintances. One aspect of his work was what he called the "French Plan" which prioritized small returns on large ventures, rather than large returns on small ventures. As such, the French Companies were split into several smaller companies, which handled investment, design, construction, and management. After constructing a development, the French Companies turned it over at its actual cost, without additional expenses. Before the construction of the Fred F. French Building, the French Plan was applied exclusively to small residential developments. In addition to Tudor City and Knickerbocker Village, French was also involved in the planning of what would have been the world's tallest building on Sixth Avenue, although this plan was abandoned in 1932.

== Personal life ==
French was married to Cordelia Williams, with whom he had four children:

- Theodore French
- John Winslow French (1918–1999), who married Adeline Greer.
- Frederick F. French, Jr.
- Ellen Millard French, who married Ernest McKay.

The Frenches lived at 1140 Fifth Avenue in New York City.

He died on August 30, 1936, of a heart attack at his summer home, Hammersley Hills, in Pawling, New York, that he had been going to since 1929. His estate was valued at under $10,000 and did not include any real estate holdings.

== Legacy ==
The life of Fred F. French and his contribution to the development of New York City was covered in detail by Alexander Rayden in "The People's City, A History of the Influence and Contribution of Mass Real Estate Syndication in the Development of New York City".
