= East Side (Manhattan) =

Area of Manhattan, New York City

Coordinates: 40.75°N 73.98°W

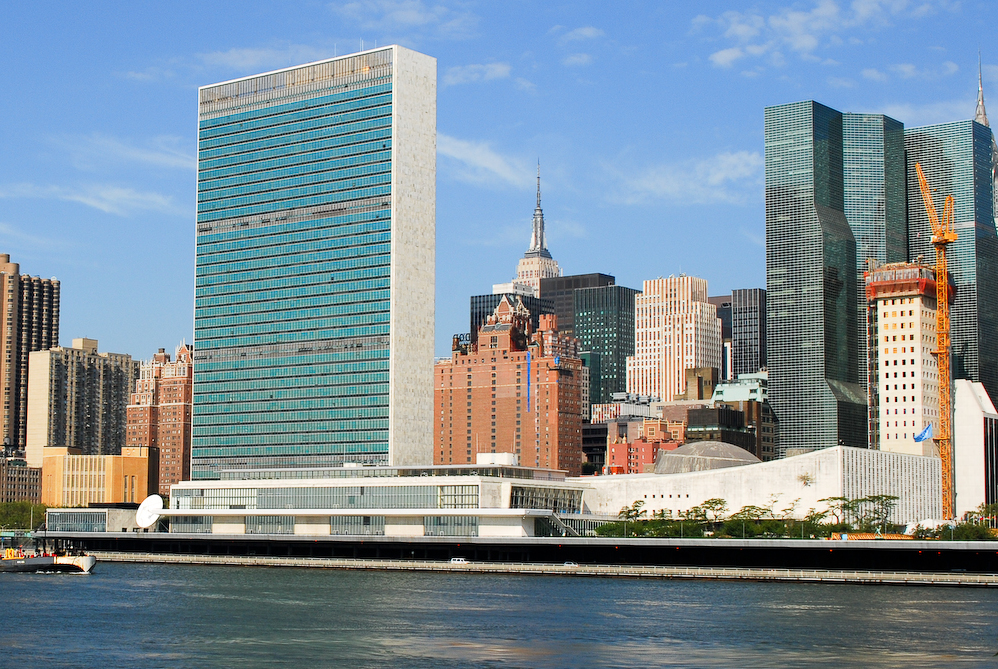
The East Side of Manhattan seen from across the East River on Roosevelt Island in 2008; from left to right: the United Nations Secretariat Building, U.N. Conference Building, and the U.N. General Assembly. In the background are the Empire State Building, Tudor City, and other high-rise buildings in Manhattan.

The East Side of Manhattan refers to the side of Manhattan which abuts the East River, and faces Brooklyn and Queens, all in New York City. Fifth Avenue, Central Park from 59th to 110th streets, and Broadway below 8th Street separate it from the West Side.

The major neighborhoods on the East Side include (from north to south) East Harlem, Yorkville, the Upper East Side, Turtle Bay, Murray Hill, Kips Bay, Gramercy, East Village, and the Lower East Side. The main north-south expressways servicing the East Side are the Franklin D. Roosevelt East River Drive and Harlem River Drive, which, for the majority of their length, are separated from the east shore of the island by the Manhattan Waterfront Greenway. The East Side is served by the IRT East Side Line subway, and by many bus lines.

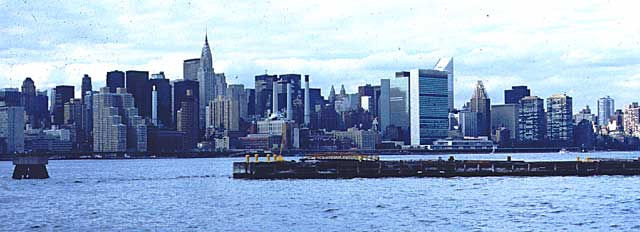
East side of Midtown Manhattan, as seen from Greenpoint in Brooklyn in 1998

== See also ==
- East Side Kids
