= Tudor City =

Apartment complex in Manhattan, New York

- Tudor City Historic District
- U.S. National Register of Historic Places
- U.S. Historic district
- New York State Register of Historic Places
- New York City Landmark
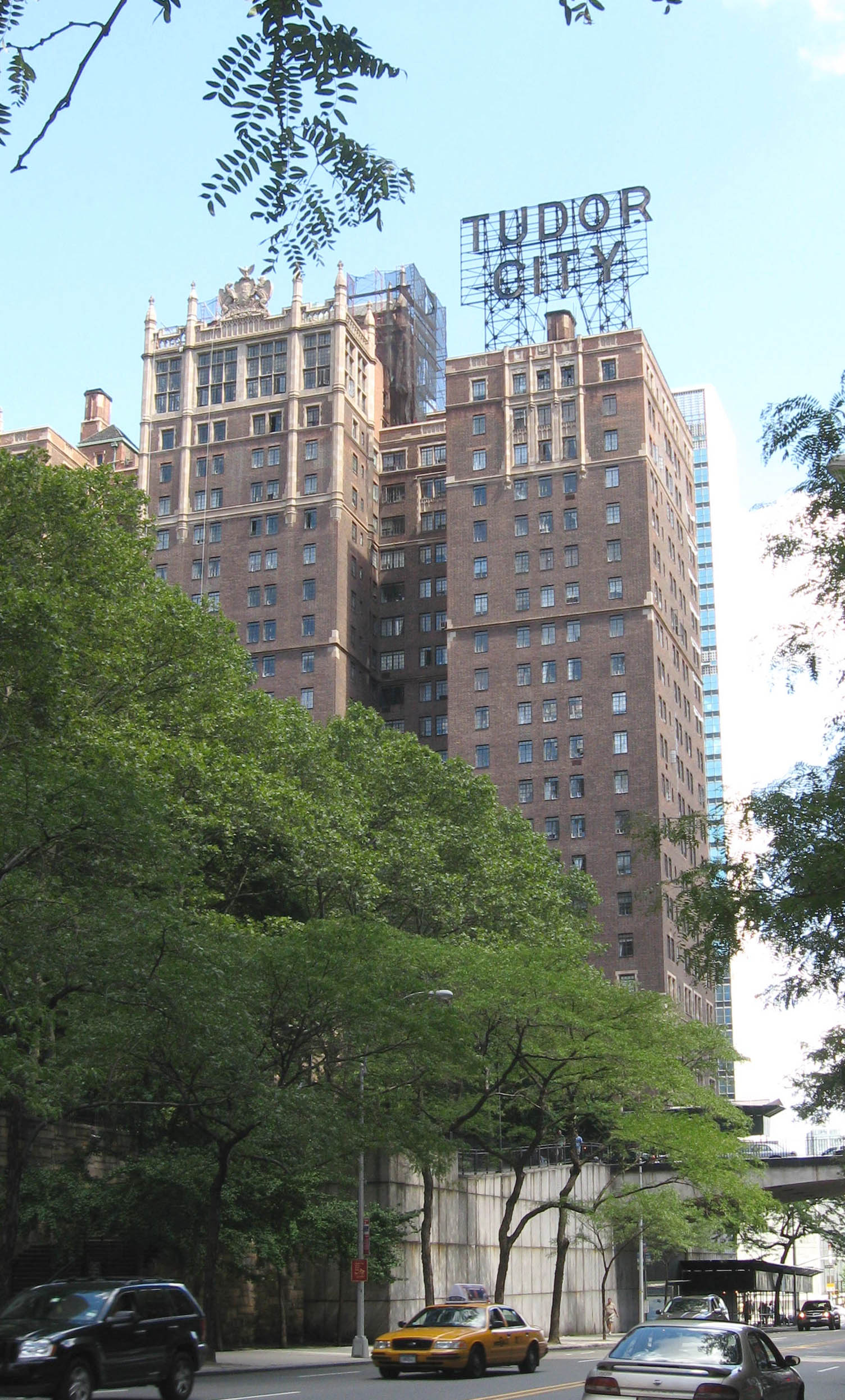
- Prospect Tower in Tudor City
- Interactive map of Tudor City Historic District
- Coordinates: 40°44′58″N 73°58′11.5″W
- Built by: Fred F. French Company
- Architects: H. Douglas Ives, with the staff of the Fred F. French Company (first 12 Tudor City buildings); William Hohauser (2 Tudor City Place)
- NRHP reference No.: 86002516
- NYCL No.: 1579

Significant dates
- Added to NRHP: September 11, 1986
- Designated NYSRHP: August 11, 1986
- Designated NYCL: May 17, 1988

Tudor City is an apartment complex on the East Side of Manhattan in New York City, bordering the Turtle Bay and Murray Hill neighborhoods. It lies on a low cliff east of Second Avenue, between 40th and 43rd Streets, and overlooks First Avenue to the east. Designed and developed by the Fred F. French Company, the complex is named for its Tudor Revival architecture. Construction commenced in 1926, making it one of the first residential skyscraper complexes in the world. Tudor City was also one of the first and largest examples of a planned middle-class residential community in New York City. The complex is a New York City designated landmark district and is listed on the National Register of Historic Places.

The 13-building complex consists of 11 housing cooperative structures, one rental apartment building, and one short-term hotel, which collectively house 5,000 people. Most of Tudor City's buildings are arranged around 41st and 43rd Streets, which slope upward east of Second Avenue; the eastern ends of the two streets are connected by Tudor City Place, which crosses over 42nd Street. Two parks flank 42nd Street, and there was originally an 18-hole miniature golf course in the southern park. The buildings generally contained stone, brick, and terracotta facades, as well as ornate Tudor-style details. The Fred F. French Company advertised Tudor City heavily, erecting large signs on the roofs of two buildings on 42nd Street.

Before Tudor City was constructed, tenements and slums dominated the area. Following the development of the nearby Grand Central Terminal and office buildings during the early 20th century, Fred F. French began planning a residential enclave in Midtown Manhattan. French announced plans for Tudor City in December 1925, and the first 12 structures were completed in phases between October 1927 and late 1930. The section of 42nd Street through Tudor City was widened in the 1950s with the construction of the nearby United Nations headquarters, and the complex's last residential building, 2 Tudor City Place, was finished in 1956. The French Company sold the Hotel Tudor in 1963. Harry Helmsley bought most of the remaining buildings in 1970 and, over the next decade and a half, attempted to redevelop Tudor City's private parks. Helmsley resold the buildings in 1984 to Philip Pilevsky and Francis J. Greenburger, who converted most of these structures to co-op apartments.

== History ==
=== Background ===
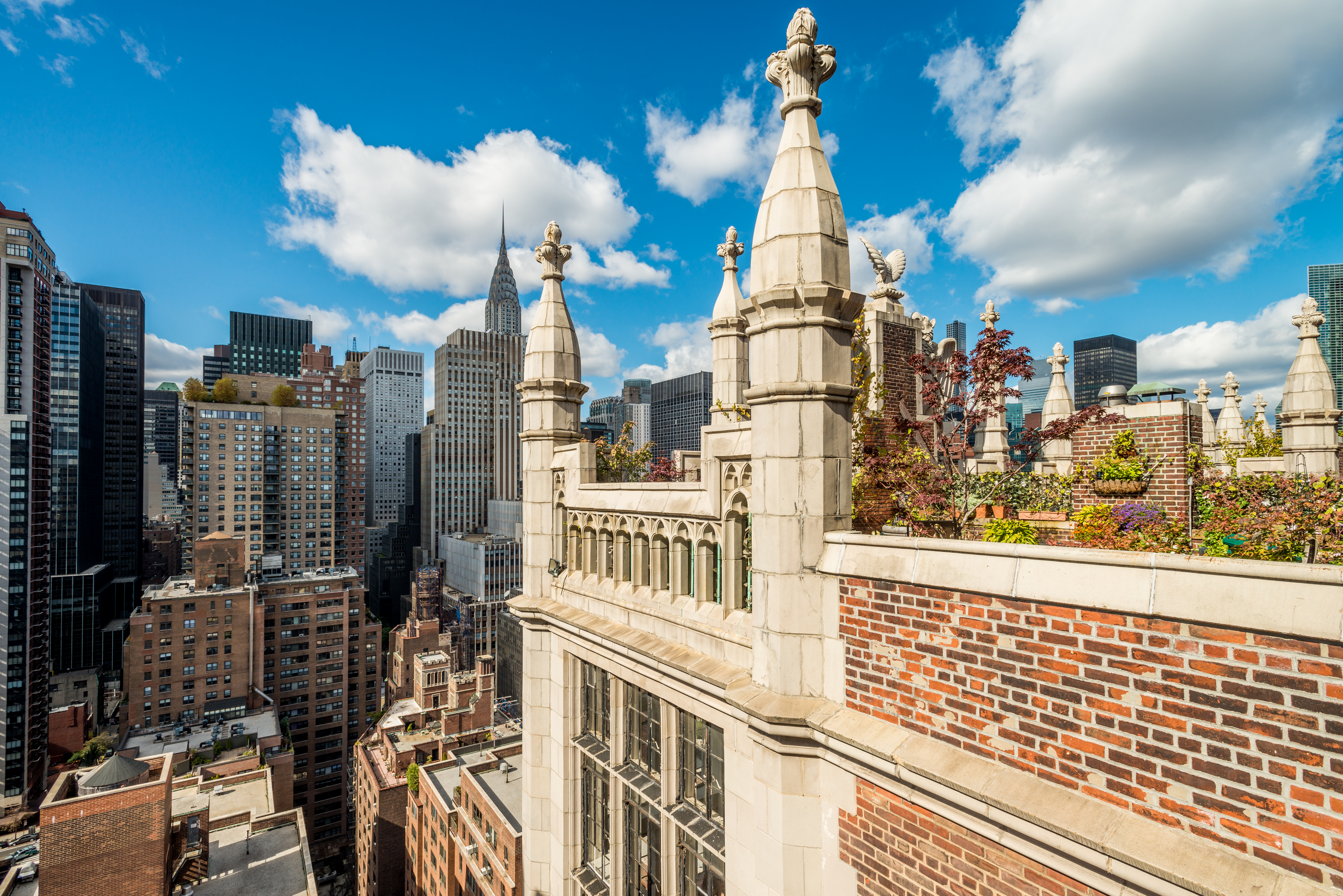
A penthouse terrace at Windsor Tower, looking west

The site was historically part of the Turtle Bay Farm, which had been acquired in 1795 by Francis Winthrop, who named the area Prospect Hill because it overlooked the East River. Prospect Hill rises eastward from Second Avenue to a granite cliff about 40 feet above First Avenue. Neither 41st nor 43rd Streets reach First Avenue but end at a three-block-long north–south street called Tudor City Place, which crosses 42nd Street on an overpass. The topography provides a measure of seclusion. Until the mid-19th century, the area was farmland. The huts and farms in the area attracted many squatters, and the bluff itself was controlled by "Paddy" Corcoran, who lived in a hut at the top of the hill.

The area was first developed following the Civil War when the streets between First and Second Avenues were largely built up with brownstone-fronted row houses erected for the middle class. Development of single-family houses in the Tudor City area peaked in 1870, and horse-drawn streetcar lines were built along Second and Third Avenues. The Church of the Covenant established a mission called Covenant Chapel in 1870, which had relocated to Prospect Hill by the end of the 19th century. Elevated railway lines were erected on Second and Third Avenues in the late 1870s. Soon afterward, the blocks east of First Avenue were taken over by noxious industries: abattoirs and meat packing houses, a gasworks, an animal glue factory, and the Waterside Generating Station. Middle-class families abandoned their row houses, and lower-income workers moved into these buildings, which became tenements or boarding houses. By the early 20th century, many of Manhattan's wealthier residents had moved to the suburbs, commuting to Midtown through the then-new Grand Central Terminal.

=== Development ===
==== Site selection ====
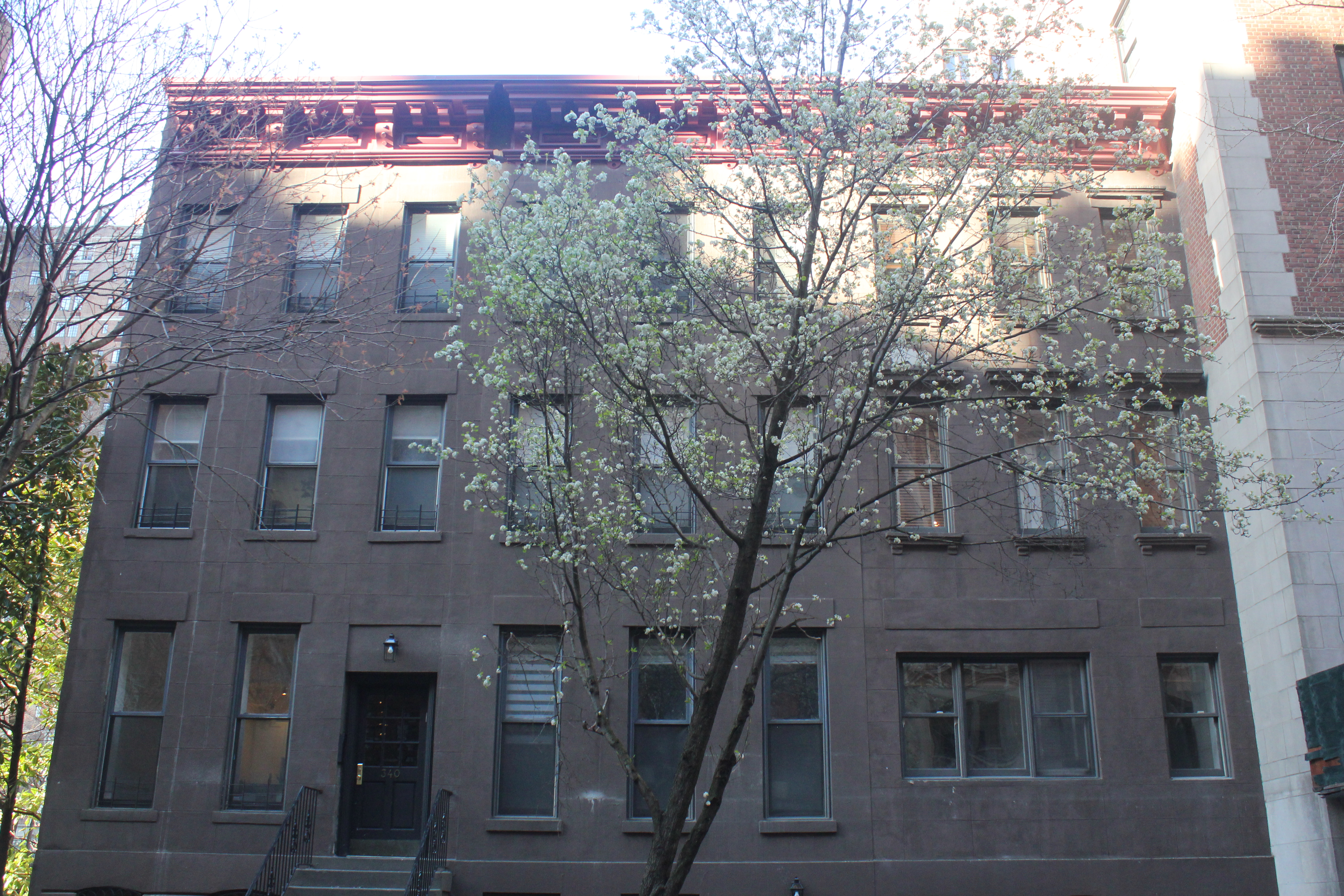
A row house in Tudor City, one of the few surviving structures from before the apartment complex's construction

A real estate operator named Leonard Gans believed there was a market for middle-class apartments within walking distance of Grand Central Terminal and that Prospect Hill was an advantageous location for it. He persuaded Paine Edson – a long-time employee of the real-estate development firm Fred F. French Company – who convinced Fred French himself. French wished to create a residential enclave in Midtown Manhattan, as he believed the New York City Subway was overcrowded and unsanitary, and traffic congestion in the city was growing. According to author Lawrence R. Samuel, Prospect Hill's topography and proximity to the East River made it "an ideal spot to situate a group of high-rise buildings that would offer thousands of residents sanctuary from the various transportation woes that plagued the city". With Gans's help, the company quickly acquired nearly a hundred properties. The site covered 5 acres (2.0 ha) and had cost approximately $23 per square foot ($250/m^{2}). It took five weeks to buy all the parcels on the site; on average, Gans bought three land lots per day.

On December 18, 1925, French announced plans for Tudor City, a large residential development on Prospect Hill. In contrast to French's earlier apartment buildings on Park Avenue, which mainly attracted wealthy people because of their upscale addresses, the new Tudor City targeted middle-class managers and professionals who had previously commuted from the suburbs. Reflecting his intentions for Tudor City, French popularized the phrase "walk to work" in connection with the buildings' development. The buildings would also be highly visible from Grand Central, further increasing their appeal to potential residents. The assemblage was valued at $7.5 million in 1925 dollars, and the project was to cost $22.5 million in total. French selected one of his company's architects – H. Douglas Ives, who had formerly worked for Cass Gilbert – to supervise the project. The buildings were to be designed with many elements of the Elizabethan and Tudor architectural styles, which dated from 16th-century England.

==== Construction and opening ====
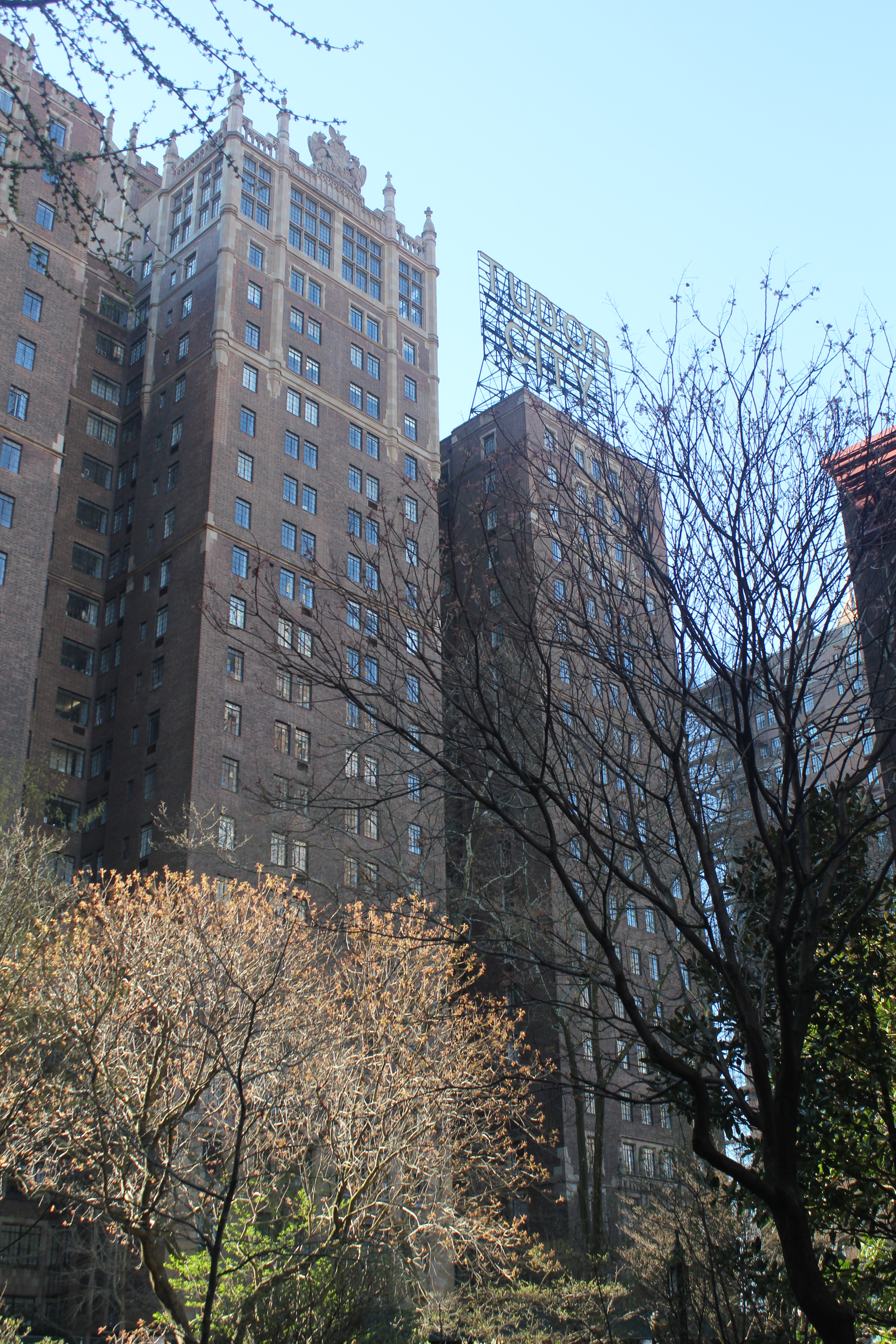
Prospect Tower, the oldest building to be erected in Tudor City

French ordered more than 10 million pieces of face brick in 1926; at the time, it was the largest such order in New York City. The first structure in the development, the 22-story Prospect Tower, was announced in June 1926. The French Company filed plans with the New York City Department of Buildings for the Cloister, right across the street, that September. Plans for the third building, the Manor, were filed in December 1926, and excavations for the first two buildings were completed soon afterward. French, who expressed optimism about the project, soon increased the estimated cost to $40 million. In February 1927, the French Company filed plans for another 22-story building and began constructing the steelwork for the first three buildings. The steelwork for the Manor and Prospect Tower was finished by that April. French had wanted to rent out apartments for $500 per year, but the development had garnered much more interest than French had intended. As early as March 1927, the French Company had rented out 44 apartments in the first two towers; by that June, the company was receiving 250 applications per week from potential residents.

The Manor and Prospect Tower opened on September 30, 1927, followed by the Cloister soon afterward. When the first two buildings opened, apartments in Prospect Tower without housekeeping services were already being rented for $800 to $2,050, and units with housekeeping were being rented at higher prices. By November 1927, ninety percent of the apartments in the Manor and Prospect Tower had been rented, a figure that had increased to 99 percent by May 1928. The remaining towers in the complex, similarly, were nearly fully occupied soon after they were completed. The fourth building in the complex, the Hermitage, was completed in early 1928, followed that May by Tudor Tower. The French Company bought a rowhouse on 42nd Street in December 1927 and acquired additional property on 41st and 42nd Streets in February 1928. The firm filed plans for buildings at 312–324 East 42nd Street and 314 East 41st Street in March 1928. By then, seven structures were being planned or under construction in Tudor City, including a 60-story apartment building that was to be the world's tallest.

Major developments on 42nd Street in 1929
1 Tudor City complex
2 Lincoln Building
3 Chanin Building
4 Chrysler Building
5 Daily News Building

Haddon Hall, Hardwicke Hall, and Hatfield House on East 41st Street all opened on January 1, 1929, and were 60 percent rented within six weeks. Woodstock Tower on 320 East 42nd Street was completed in 1929; at 23 stories, it was the tallest apartment building in New York City at the time. It was followed soon afterward by the opening of Essex House. The French Company filed plans for Windsor Tower, on the east side of Prospect Place between 40th and 41st Streets, in January 1929. This was followed in February by plans for a 53-story hotel just to the west, although plans for that tower were abandoned because of the French Company's inability to acquire the row house at 8 Prospect Place, whose owner wanted $250,000 for the property. The French Company also remodeled one of the houses on 43rd Street and converted it into a kindergarten in October 1929. Windsor Tower opened on January 1, 1930, and was the eleventh (Note: Windsor Tower was the ninth structure to be finished if Haddon Hall, Hartwicke Hall, and Hatfield House are considered a single structure.) structure in the complex to be completed. The French Company opened an indoor golf course at the base of Windsor Tower in March 1930. The last of the original Tudor City buildings to be completed was the Hotel Tudor, which opened in late 1930 and was 70 percent rented upon its completion. The Times described the project as one of several high-rise developments that were "radically changing the old-time conditions" along East 42nd Street, along with the Chanin Building, Chrysler Building, Daily News Building, and Lincoln Building.

=== French Company ownership ===
==== 1930s ====
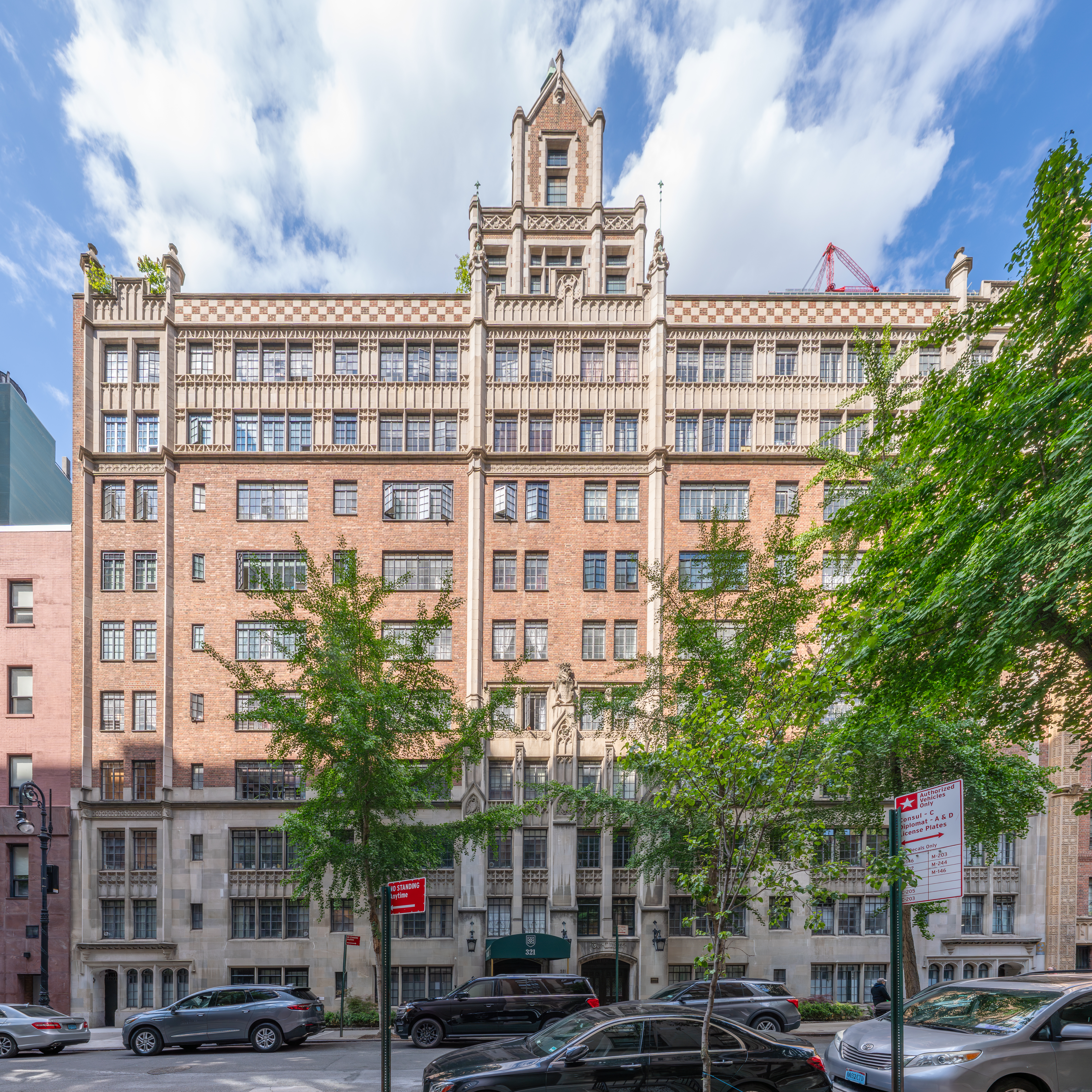
The Cloister, the second building in Tudor City

Throughout 1930, the French Company continued to advertise Tudor City as an investment opportunity. Of the original buildings in Tudor City, the Hotel Tudor was the only structure that did not originally rent apartments by the year; instead, rooms were rented on a nightly or weekly basis. Excluding the 600-room hotel, the complex had 2,800 apartments and 581 staff members upon its completion. French advertised the units to people who were working in Midtown Manhattan, particularly at large structures such as the Graybar Building and Chrysler Building, and he also tried to entice diners at the complex's restaurants to rent at Tudor City. The complex had cost $30 million, or $10 million below the original projected cost. The buildings were still not fully occupied by the end of 1930, prompting rental managers to reduce the prices of the remaining apartments. As the Depression continued, the French Company continued to lower prices and advertised the buildings' proximity to transit options and Midtown Manhattan offices. Advertisements also promoted the area's "old-world charm" and sense of community, though the writer Lawrence Samuel says the wording may have implied that the residents were largely white.

The French Company had acquired nearly the entire block between Prospect Place (later Tudor City Place), Second Avenue, and 40th and 41st Streets by September 1928. The exception was the row house at 8 Tudor City Place, whose owner would only sell for a very high price. The company cleared the rest of the plot and built a miniature golf course, which replaced the southern park's mini-golf course. Due to the French Company's inability to buy the house at 8 Tudor City Place, the redevelopment of that site was delayed. The French Company announced in 1933 that it would open a set of tennis and handball courts at Tudor City, and the Tudor City Tennis Club began operating the tennis courts that June. A ski slope was installed on the site of the tennis courts during early 1937. French intended for these activities to create a sense of community within the complex.

The French Company's stockholders continued to own the complex after French died in 1936. Twenty thousand tulips from the Netherlands were planted across the complex that year. Over the next several years, new tulips were planted in the complex's gardens every summer. The French Company banned dogs from Tudor City's apartments in 1937, making it New York City's largest apartment complex with such a restriction. In its early years, the enclave also hosted events such as tulip exhibitions (which quickly grew in popularity throughout the 1930s) and springtime festivals. The French Company also tried to reorganize Woodstock Tower in 1938, but this was rejected.

==== Early 1940s ====
With the economy improving, in 1940, the French Company resumed advertisements that targeted a variety of potential tenants, such as newlyweds and families. Following the onset of World War II, the complex began hosting patriotic drills and wartime fundraisers. As a wartime precaution, air-raid drills were frequently conducted inside the buildings; a scrap-metal pile was created on 42nd Street; and first-aid stations were established in their basements. Residents rejected another proposal to convert Tudor City's gardens to victory gardens where fruits and vegetables would be grown. The war itself caused a citywide housing shortage, so the buildings remained fully occupied during the war, with 2,800 families. These apartments had a total of 4,000 residents in 1942. By the early 1940s, the company reported that around 1,100 families had lived in Tudor City for at least five years and that around 400 families had lived there for at least ten years.

Tudor City's popularity in the 1940s was attributed in part to the complex's recreational facilities, which included the tennis courts, five sun decks, and a water playground. The recreational facilities helped entice Tudor City residents to remain within New York City, at a time when wealthy city dwellers tended to travel to the suburbs during the summer. After World War II ended, a shortage of affordable apartments in Manhattan caused demand for Tudor City's apartments to increase. The company announced plans in August 1944 for a 12-story building on the southwestern corner of 41st Street and Tudor City Place, contingent on the company's acquisition of 8 Tudor City Place. The building would have had a 70-spot parking garage and 167 apartments, each with three or four rooms. The French Company finally acquired the site 8 Tudor City Place in June 1945, at which point all of the structures surrounding that lot had been demolished several years prior. The 12-story structure there was never built because of a lack of money.

==== United Nations headquarters improvements ====
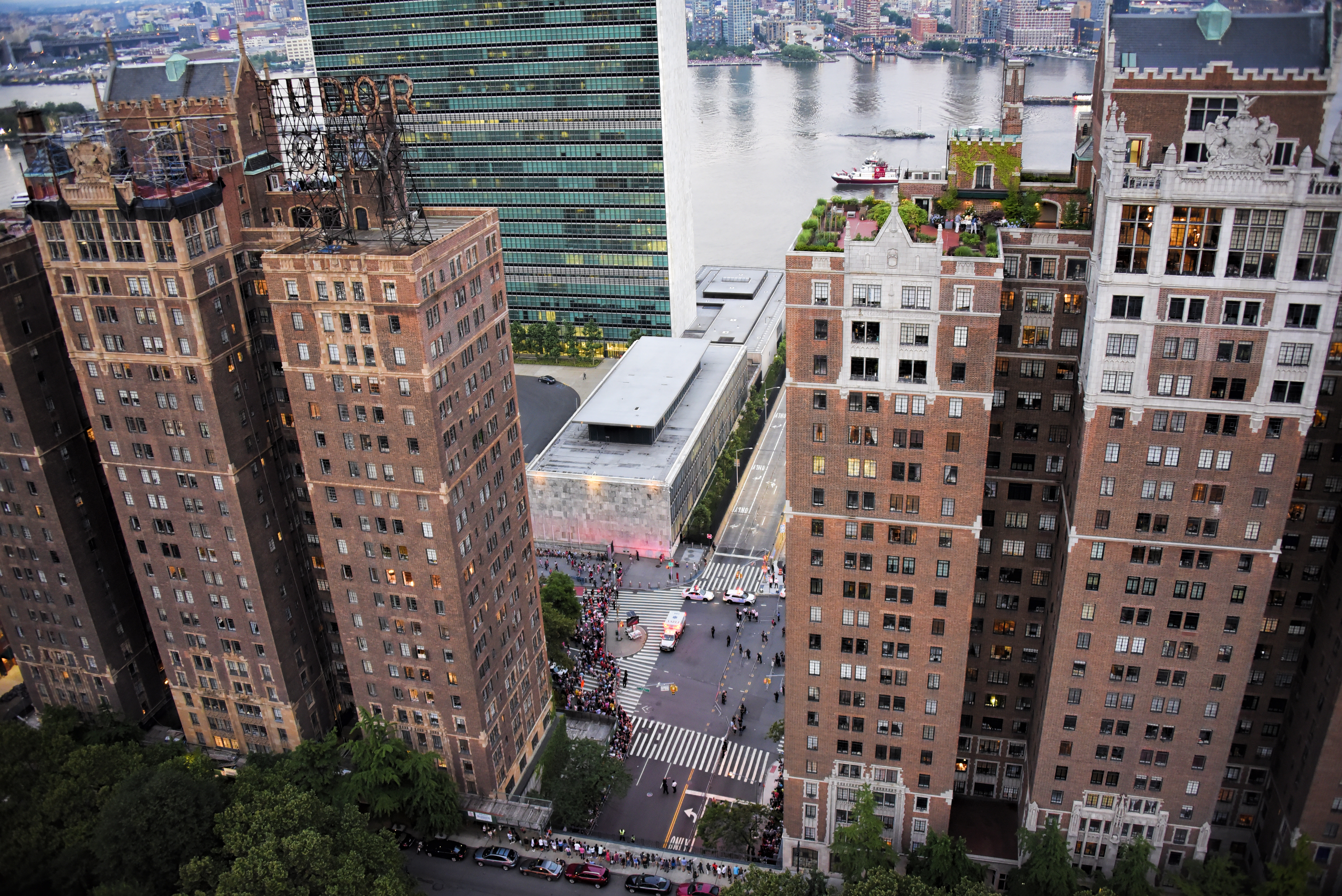
The U.N. Secretariat Building and Dag Hammarskjöld Library behind Prospect and Tudor Towers, with North Park at the bottom left

By 1946, the community had 5,500 residents. Around that time, the developer William Zeckendorf had bought up the old slaughterhouses east of Tudor City for the development of the United Nations headquarters. Both the French Company and the Tudor City newsletter's newsletter supported the development. In advance of the UN headquarters' construction, the New York City Board of Estimate proposed new zoning regulations for the area around Tudor City, limiting the height of new buildings. A lawyer for Tudor City unsuccessfully sought an exemption from the regulations, which were passed in May 1947. The regulations prevented the French Company from constructing residential skyscrapers in Tudor City, as they had intended. Furthermore, the company had difficulty financing any new buildings, and the federal government restricted them from raising rents as well.

To improve access to the United Nations headquarters, the city government proposed widening both 42nd Street and Tudor City Place and narrowing Tudor City's parks in mid-1948. This would eliminate two service roads on 42nd Street and require the relocation of several buildings' entrances. Many residents opposed the widening of Tudor City Place and the shrinking of both of the enclave's parks, and more than 2,400 residents signed a petition protesting the plans. French Company vice president Charles N. Blakeley also objected to the plan, saying it would force tenants of the affected buildings to use stairs or escalators to reach their own front doors. City officials contended that the street widening was necessary because 42nd Street already carried high amounts of vehicular traffic to and from the nearby FDR Drive. The New York City Planning Commission approved the plans in September 1948. The Board of Estimate, overriding the residents' objections, approved $1.848 million for the project that December. The board provisionally authorized the street widening in June 1949, and Manhattan's borough president announced in December 1949 that work would commence shortly. The project entailed reducing the width of the parks by 22 feet (6.7 m).

In 1950, the New York City Art Commission tentatively approved plans for two municipal parks near Tudor City Place, one on either side of 42nd Street. The neighboring stretch of 42nd Street was temporarily closed in February 1951. The work was supposed to be completed by early 1952, but the project was significantly delayed. After the service roads were removed, the main entrances to the Hotel Tudor, Church of the Covenant, and Woodstock Tower were stranded up to 17 feet (5.2 m) above the new grade of 42nd Street. The owners of all three buildings lowered their entrances and sued the city government for damages. (Note: Woodstock Tower's owners requested that the city pay $875,000; about half of this amount was attributed to a decline in the building's value. After a city appraiser found that the project had actually caused Woodstock Tower's valuation to increase, the award was reduced to $426,000. The owner of the Hotel Tudor filed a claim for about $166,400, while the church filed a claim for $115,000; both buildings received a fraction of these claims.) Rows of houses near the top of the hill on both sides were replaced with public parks designed by J. J. Levison.

During the late 1940s and early 1950s, rumors persisted that the French Company was planning to sell Tudor City, prompting further fears that existing residents would be evicted. The construction of the UN headquarters also disrupted daily routines; residents had to sidestep sidewalk and park construction, and they hosted meetings because of fears that the area could be targeted during the Cold War. These issues were exacerbated by allegations of racial discrimination in the community, including a lawsuit filed by a black man who claimed that he was twice prohibited from using one of the community's elevators. By 1952, UN–related construction was largely completed. The block of 42nd Street between First and Second Avenues was reopened in October 1952 after the widened street and the new overpass were completed. The widening of 42nd Street within Tudor City ultimately cost $1.4 million.

==== New building and late 1950s ====
No new buildings were developed until 25 years after the rest of the complex was completed. William I. Hohauser was hired in 1954 to design an apartment building on a 55,000-square-foot (5,100 m^{2}) site at 2 Tudor City Place. The building was to rise 15 stories from Tudor City Place and 41st Street; the 40th Street side was three stories below the Tudor City Place side. Work on the building, known as Tudor Gardens, began in April 1954. Unlike the other structures in the enclave, Tudor Gardens was developed by a third-party group led by builder Gandolfo Schimenti. The group had leased the site from the French Company for 89 years. on the condition that they could not sell the land or mortgage the property. Tudor Gardens opened in 1956, lacking the Tudor-style ornament of all the other buildings except the Hotel Tudor. After 2 Tudor City Place was finished, Tudor City had no more space for additional buildings.

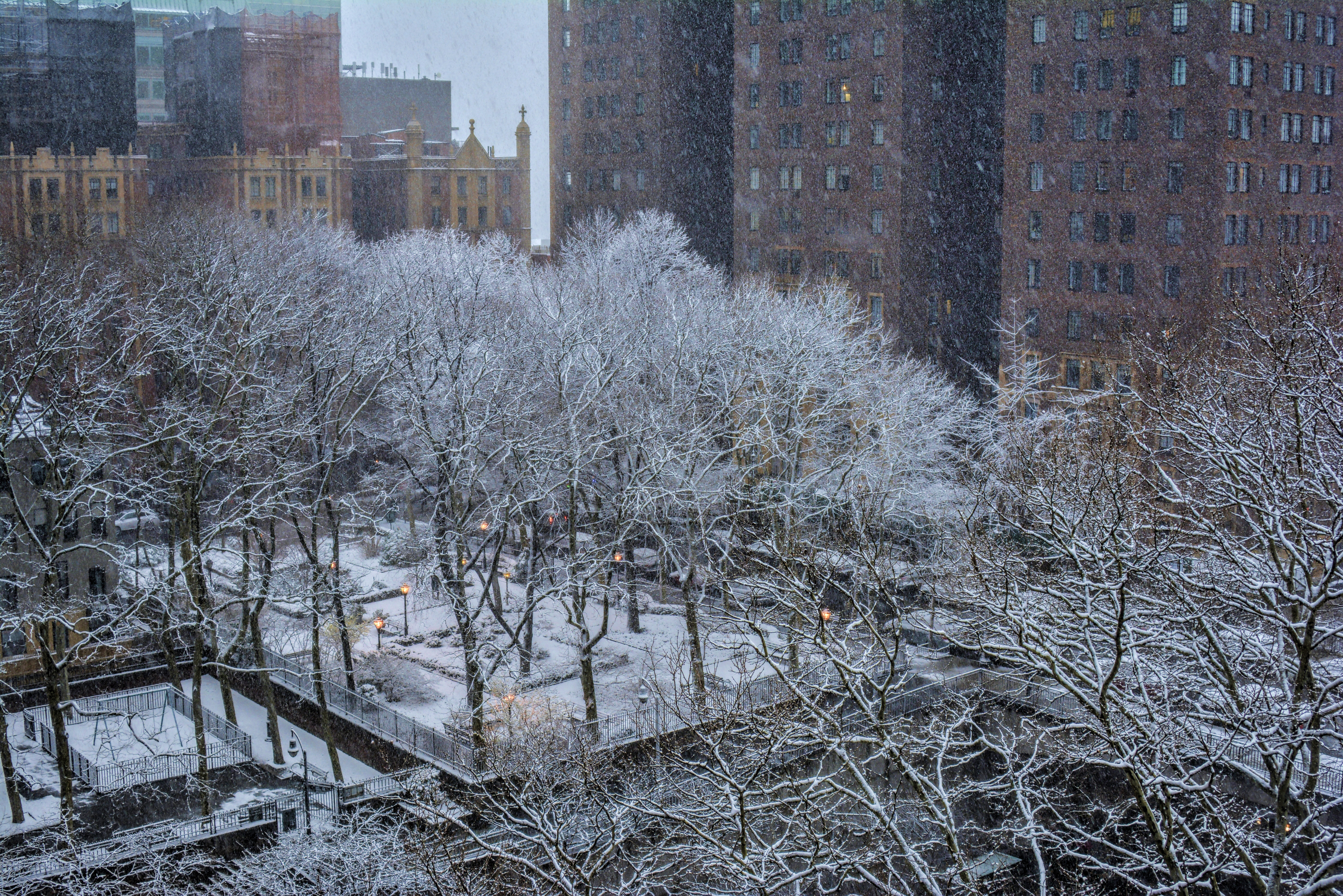
North Park surrounded by (clockwise from top left) The Manor, Prospect Tower, Tudor Grove Playground, and Mary O'Connor Playground (the two city-owned parks)

In response to increasing noise complaints from the enclave's tenants, 1,500 residents formed a committee in 1955 to reduce noise from traffic and other buildings in the surrounding neighborhood. The French Company acquired additional land over the years. By 1959, the company owned the entire block between 40th Street, First Avenue, 41st Street, and Second Avenue, which included the southernmost part of Tudor City.

==== 1960s ====
The French Company leased the site west of the Hotel Tudor and announced plans in 1962 to develop a 17-story office building there, designed by William Lescaze. Local media described it as Tudor City's first office building. Several office buildings had been developed in the neighborhood during the last several years, including the Pfizer Building and an expansion to the Daily News Building. The French Company sold the Hotel Tudor in June 1963 to a group of investors who planned to renovate it. The new office building on Second Avenue had been completed by late 1963. Concurrently, the Ford Foundation announced plans to construct its headquarters on the north side of 42nd Street, surrounded on three sides by Tudor City's apartment buildings; that structure was completed in 1967.

The French Company also announced plans in March 1964 to refurbish Tudor City's 12 apartment buildings, none of which had ever been renovated. The project included redecorating each building's lobby; installing electric ranges in studio apartments; replacing the elevators; and adding wallpaper and carpeting in hallways. By then, the company had also replaced four-fifths of the London plane trees on the sidewalks with sturdier ginkgo trees.

United Nations officials announced plans in 1968 to develop additional office buildings west of the United Nations headquarters, abutting the Cloister and the Manor in Tudor City. The original plan, which was canceled in 1970, would have displaced hundreds of families in Tudor City. Some residents of Tudor City objected to the plans, claiming that the UN plan would force them out; others alleged that the Ford Foundation was planning to buy Tudor City, although the foundation denied these claims. In response, city and state officials specifically excluded Tudor City from the UN plan. In early 1969, the New York City Planning Commission considered rezoning Tudor City to prevent office development there. The enclave's residents continued to express concerns that the United Nations or the Ford Foundation would develop structures that encroached on Tudor City.

=== Helmsley ownership ===
Harry Helmsley's company Helmsley-Spear bought most of the apartment buildings (except Hotel Tudor and 2 Tudor City Place), as well as the enclave's private parks, in June 1970 for $36 million. By then, Tudor City's population was largely composed of older people living in rent-regulated apartments; by 1971, one out of four residents had lived there for over 15 years. Many younger people were moving into apartments that had been vacated by rent-regulated tenants. Following the sale, Helmsley controlled 11 of 12 apartment buildings in Tudor City, comprising a total of 3,500 units; these apartments housed between 7,500 and 10,000 people by the 1980s. Helmsley said he "can't afford to buy a park and pay taxes on it", and he soon announced plans to replace Tudor City's parks with luxury apartment buildings, to much controversy. Over the next decade, residents stalled the redevelopment of Tudor City's parks by stealing construction materials, filing lawsuits, and, in one case, placing themselves in front of a bulldozer.

==== Initial park-development proposals ====
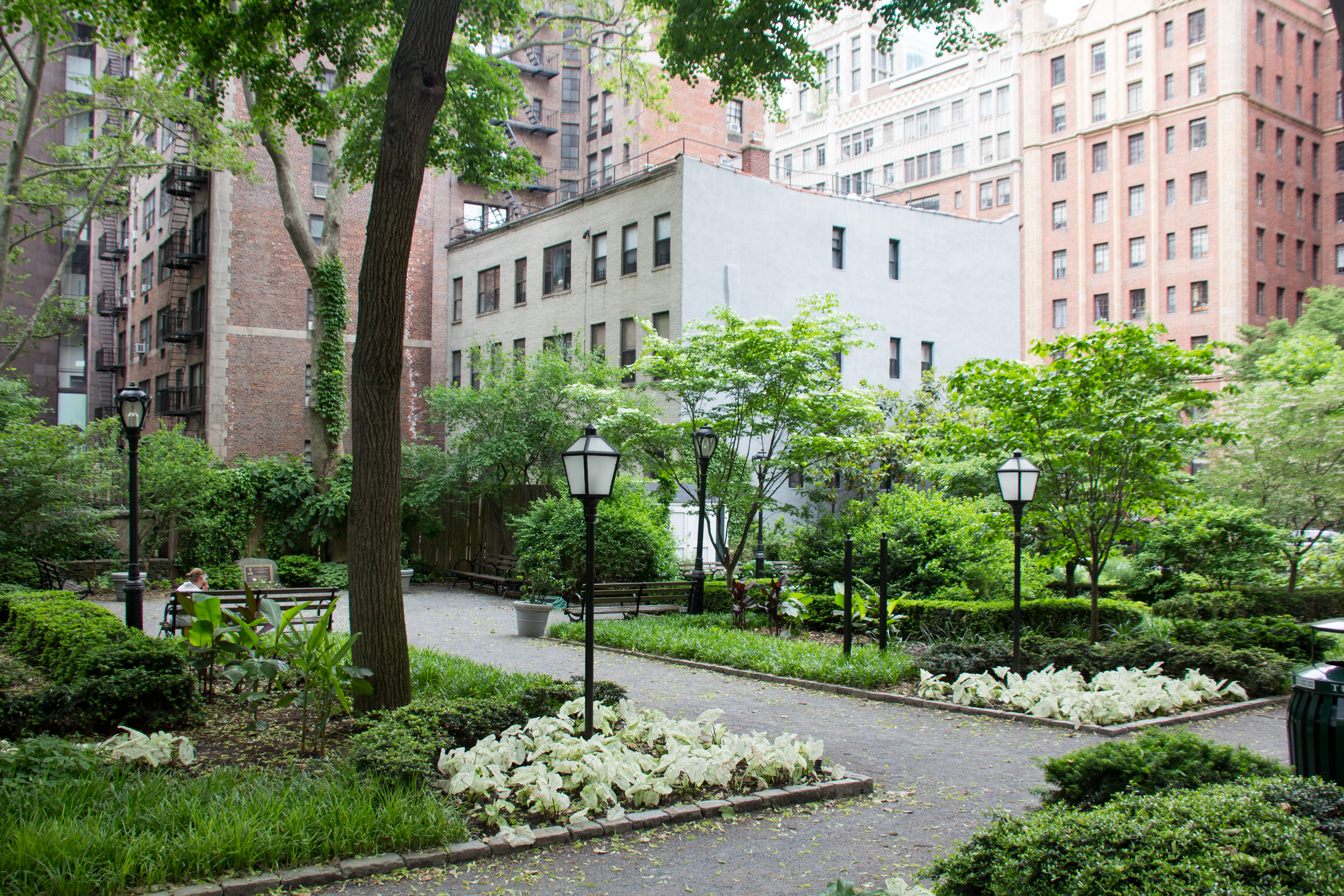
One of Tudor City's parks. During the 1970s, there were plans to develop buildings on the parks.

By November 1971, two hundred residents were formulating plans to save Tudor City's parks, backed by a bipartisan group of lawmakers. The Save Our Parks Committee, a group dedicated to preserving the parks, had 500 members by July 1972, when they requested that the New York City Planning Commission rezone the parks to prevent any development there. Helmsley announced plans in September 1972 to construct an apartment building spanning 42nd Street, which would replace the two parks. City officials prepared several alternatives that would either preserve at least one of the parks or allow Helmsley to construct a new park above 42nd Street. The City Planning Commission voted in November 1972 to create a special zoning district for the private parks, preventing Helmsley from developing them, and the New York City Board of Estimate finalized the zoning district the next month. The parks would become public parks, and Helmsley would be allowed to shift the parks' air rights to another site in Midtown Manhattan.

Tudor City's owner of record – Ramsgate, controlled by Helmsley – defaulted on its mortgage after the parks were rezoned, prompting Helmsley to request that a state judge overturn the rezoning. Helmsley submitted documents to the Attorney General of New York in December 1973, indicating that he wished to convert Tudor City to condominiums. He would have first converted 100 condos at Essex House. The next month, a state judge invalidated the city's rezoning of the enclave's parks; according to The New York Times, the rezoning had represented an "unconstitutional taking of property". Tudor City's tenants also organized in opposition to the planned condo conversion. After all of Tudor City's workers went on strike in 1976, the enclave's residents sued for rent rebates because they "suffered a cutback in services".

==== Land-swap proposal ====
By 1978, Helmsley was again proposing to replace Tudor City's private parks with apartment buildings, prompting renewed protests. As a compromise, Helmsley proposed erecting a 50-story tower at First Avenue and 43rd Street, across from the United Nations Secretariat Building. The structure would have had 376 apartments and would have adjoined Prospect Tower, which had almost no windows facing eastward. City officials seriously considered Helmsley's proposal, which would have preserved the two private parks. If that plan were not approved, he planned to build a pair of towers, rising 28 and 30 stories, on the site of the private parks. Residents threatened to file lawsuits to preserve the parks, but legal experts said the residents had no legal standing because Helmsley owned the sites. By early 1979, Helmsley had not decided what to do with the private parks. The city government proposed swapping Tudor City's private parks with part of the nearby Robert Moses Playground in April 1979, allowing Helmsley to construct a skyscraper on the Moses site while the city took over Tudor City's parks. The New York State Legislature passed a law the same year to allow the land swap.

Helmsley, the Tudor City Tenants Association, and city and state officials announced a tentative agreement in June 1980, which would indefinitely postpone the two parks' demolition. The City Planning Commission approved the land swap in February 1981, but the swap received much opposition, including from the East End Hockey Association and two city officials. Hundreds of roller-hockey players signed a petition opposing Helmsley's plans. Mayor Ed Koch, an initial supporter of the plan, announced in March 1981 that he would oppose the project after rival developer Donald Trump argued that the playground was more valuable than Helmsley's proposed building. The city's housing commissioner sued the same month to prevent the land swap, claiming that the private parks were "essential services" for Tudor City's 1,200 rent-controlled tenants. That May, a member of Manhattan Community Board 6 drafted a proposal to preserve the parks, and a state senator proposed a six-month moratorium on the parks' demolition.

As an alternative to the land swap, Helmsley proposed erecting a tower at First Avenue and 51st Street, in exchange for transferring Tudor City's private parks to the city, in early 1981. Koch rejected this plan as well, deeming it financially infeasible. After his revised plan was rejected, Helmsley announced in January 1982 that he would again try to develop the private parks, since Fred F. French had originally intended to build towers on these sites. The Board of Estimate vetoed the land swap that March. The private parks had attracted large numbers of non-residents, especially during lunchtime on weekdays, but Helmsley began stationing guards outside both of Tudor City's parks in May 1982 to keep out non-residents.

==== Further disagreements and lawsuits ====
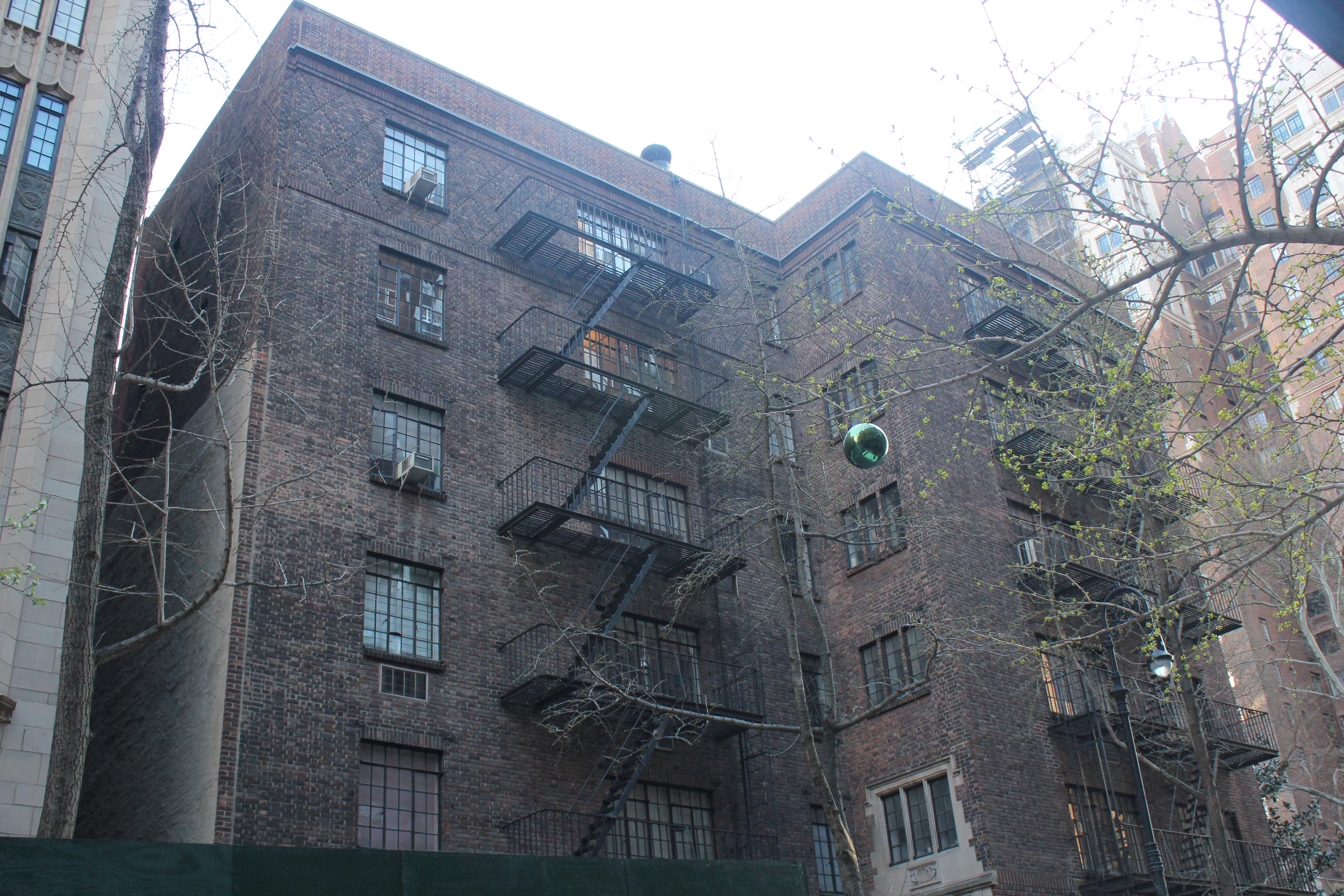
Prospect Hill Apartments

The buildings were still in high demand, and there was a six-month waiting list for an apartment by 1980. This led some tenants to sublease their apartments in violation of New York City's rent-regulation laws, prompting complaints from other residents. Helmsley sent a questionnaire to Tudor City's residents in May 1983 to determine if residents were illegally subleasing their apartments, which led city officials to accuse him of trying to evict unmarried residents. City officials requested an injunction to prevent Helmsley from mailing out the questionnaires, but the New York Supreme Court ruled that the questionnaires were valid; nonetheless, Helmsley did not force the remaining residents to complete the forms.

Meanwhile, Helmsley sold the Hermitage to Philip Pilevsky, head of Philips International, in February 1983 for $3.3 million. The structure remained a rental building but was resold several times, including to developer John Zaccaro, husband of U.S. vice-presidential candidate Geraldine Ferraro. The city's Rent Control Office ruled in July 1983 that Tudor City's private parks counted as "essential services" and that residents had to be compensated if the parks were destroyed. 2 Tudor City Place, the sole apartment building in the complex that Helmsley-Spear had never acquired, was converted to a housing cooperative by another developer in 1984. A state court ruled in October 1984 that the private parks were essential services, which ended the dispute over the parks.

=== Pilevsky and Greenburger ownership ===
==== Sale, co-op conversion, and landmark status ====
Helmsley agreed to sell the Manor to a partnership of Pilevsky and Francis J. Greenburger's company, Time Equities, in February 1984 for $14 million. Time Equities filed plans to convert that building into a co-op. This prompted objections from residents who believed that the post-conversion prices of the apartments were too high; at the time, an 800-square-foot unit cost approximately $145,000. In May 1985, Helmsley agreed to sell six additional apartment buildings, four preexisting brownstone houses, and both private parks to Pilevsky and Greenburger. These apartment buildings were also converted to co-ops; each building's co-op offering plan went into effect after at least 15 percent of the co-ops had been purchased. By mid-1987, five of the seven buildings' offering plans had gone into effect.

Helmsley sold his three remaining apartment buildings—Hatfield House, Hardwicke Hall, and Haddon Hall—to Tudor City I Associates, a partnership of Pilevsky, Michael H. Gold, and Alfred S. Friedman. These structures became co-ops in 1987. The sole remaining rental-apartment building, the Hermitage, was partially renovated before becoming involved in a corruption scandal; the DBG Property Corporation bought that building in 1986.

Tudor City residents continued fighting to preserve the complex's two gardens. To facilitate the co-op conversions, Greenburger promised that he would not develop either of the private parks, and he promised to provide funds for the parks' maintenance. In the co-op conversion, the gardens were spun off to The Trust for Public Land, a national conservancy organization. Tudor City Greens Inc., which had been established in January 1987, took title to the parks that May. In exchange, the trust received an easement that prohibited construction and unruly behavior. Greenburger and Pilevsky donated $820,000 to fund improvements to the parks, and Tudor City residents hired landscape architect Lee Weintraub to restore the parks to their original design, with wrought-iron gates and fountains. In December 1987, a state Supreme Court judge certified that Tudor City Greens Inc. was in control of the parks.

Meanwhile, the battle over Tudor City's parks had led to a preservation campaign. Residents had asked the New York City Landmarks Preservation Commission (LPC) to designate Tudor City as a historic district in early 1972, (Note: According to Newsday, Tudor City residents had asked the LPC to consider designating the historic district "exactly 13 years and 242 days" before the LPC considered the designation on December 10, 1985.) and they began advocating for Tudor City to be designated as a historic district at both the local and federal levels in January 1985. The designation would prevent the buildings' exteriors from being modified without the LPC's permission, including such small features as windows. (Note: Tudor City's residents cited the preservation of the windows as a major factor in applying for landmark designation.) A hearing on the city district was held in December 1985, at which point the district was planned to cover 19 buildings in addition to the parks. On September 11, 1986, Tudor City was added to the National Register of Historic Places as a historic district, and the city historic district was officially designated on May 17, 1988. By the late 1980s, the complex still had some rent-regulated tenants whose monthly rents were as low as $300, but studio apartments were selling for up to $120,000, and one-bedroom apartments cost up to $180,000. The co-ops largely attracted first-time homeowners and small investors.

==== 1990s to present ====
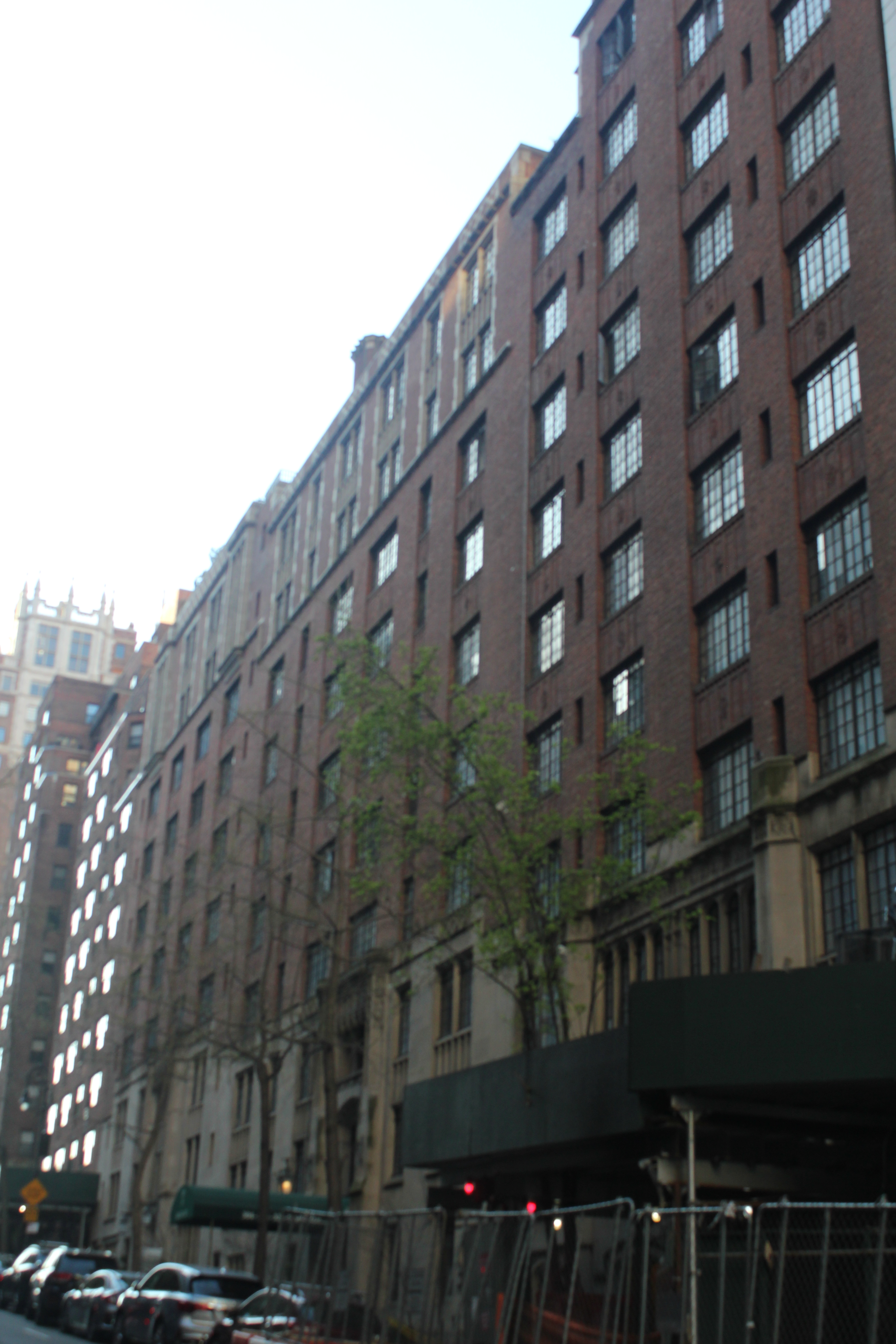
Hatfield House, Hardwicke Hall, and Haddon Hall

When the real estate market slowed during the early 1990s recession, some co-op prices dropped significantly, as owners and investors were concerned that the co-ops themselves would become insolvent. After the Black Monday stock market crash of 1987, Pilevsky and Greenburger began offering the studio apartments for as low as $77,000 to anyone who had a good credit rating. Ultimately, Time Equities struggled to finish the co-op conversions and could not pay the co-ops' taxes, mortgage, and maintenance fees. Several banks bought out Time Equities' stakes in these buildings by 1990, covering each co-op's high maintenance fees. Philips International took over each co-op's sales. New York magazine recalled in 2008 that Time Equities ended up selling apartments at a significant discount, reporting: "In 1992, if the new owner were willing to assume the accrued debts, a Tudor City one-bedroom could be had for $3,500." 2 Tudor City Place, the only co-op in the complex that was not sponsored by either Time Equities or Pilevsky, did not have problems selling its co-ops.

During the mid-1990s, Tudor City Greens spent $170,000 to renovate the enclave's private parks. The New York City Department of Parks and Recreation simultaneously renovated the complex's two public parks, which had become dilapidated over time. Prospect Tower's co-op requested the LPC's permission to remove the "Tudor City" sign from the tower's roof in 1995, but the commission refused. When the Tudor City Hotel became the Crowne Plaza at the United Nations in 1999, the owner proposed replacing the hotel's original neon sign with one that displayed its new name; many residents also expressed opposition to the replacement of that sign. Tudor City's co-op boards, which had leased the land under the complex, extended their land lease by 99 years in 1999, forty-three years before the lease was to expire.

By the first decade of the 21st century, many of the smaller apartments were being combined, although most tenants still lived there for long periods. In particular, many of the studio apartments were protected by rent regulation and thus charged extremely low rents, giving their occupants little incentive to sell. Between seven and eight percent of the enclave's apartments changed ownership every year, and the average apartment sold for more than $350,000 in 2005, a steep increase from the 1990s. Tudor City mostly retained a peaceful reputation, although the co-op boards sometimes experienced infighting, as in 2007 when several members of Tudor Tower's board were replaced. The Procaccianti Group bought the Tudor Hotel for $109 million in 2007; the hotel was then renovated, and Hilton Hotels & Resorts took over as its operator. Westgate Resorts acquired the former Hotel Tudor in 2018 and renamed it the Westgate New York City. Tudor City's public playgrounds were again renovated in the early 2020s.

== Site and layout ==
Tudor City extends roughly between Second Avenue to the west, 40th Street to the south, and First Avenue to the east; its northern boundary is halfway between 43rd and 44th Streets. The complex contains 13 apartment buildings, of which 11 are co-ops; (Note: Haddon Hall, Hardwicke Hall, and Hatfield House are sometimes alluded to as one building.) there is also a rental building called the Hermitage, as well as a short-term hotel. These structures collectively have 5,000 residents. The apartment buildings surround two blockfront-long parks belonging to the complex. The buildings are clustered to the north, east, and south, creating a "U". The complex borders the neighborhoods of Turtle Bay, to the north of 42nd Street, and Murray Hill, to the south of 42nd Street.

The New York City historic district includes all of Tudor City's apartment buildings, as well as six structures which predate Tudor City: the Church of the Covenant at 310 East 42nd Street, the Prospect Hill Apartments at 333 East 41st Street, and four brownstones, typical of the dozens on the site before Tudor City, at 337 East 41st Street and 336–340 East 43rd Street. Also included are Tudor City's two private parks (open to the public from 7 am to 10 pm daily) and two city-owned parks. The U.S. historic district is nearly the same as the New York City historic district but excludes 2 Tudor City Place and the two city-owned parks.

=== Streets ===
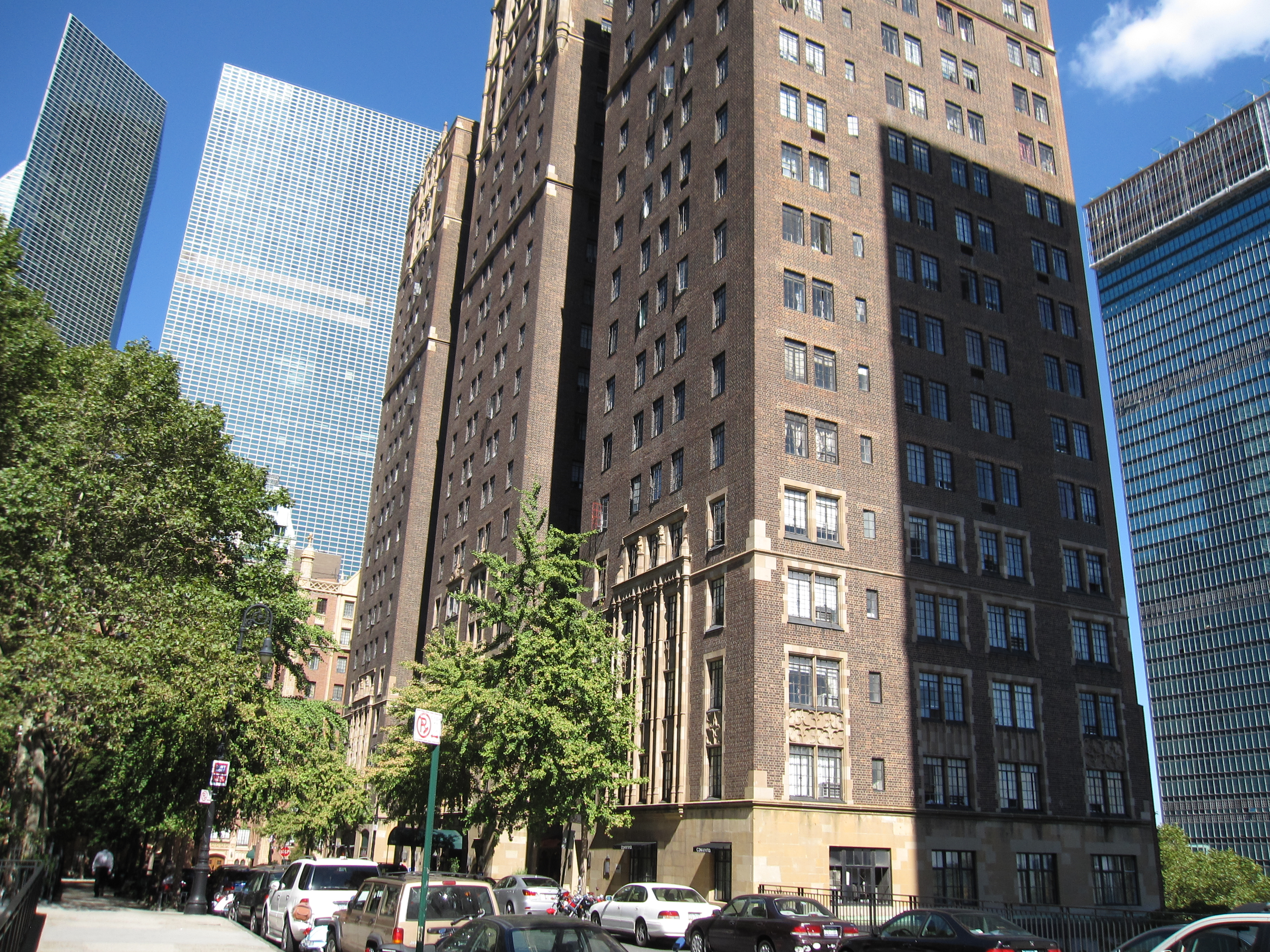
Looking north along Tudor City Place from 41st Street

Tudor City is principally accessed via 41st and 43rd Streets. Traffic within Tudor City travels eastward on 41st Street from Second Avenue, then turn onto Tudor City Place (a north-south road that crosses 42nd Street), and then turns again onto 43rd Street. One architectural critic – speaking about how cars must travel through Tudor City to approach the Ford Foundation Center for Social Justice's main entrance on 320 East 43rd Street – described the complicated approach as "not an accident but conscious contrivance". 41st and 43rd Streets both dead-end east of Tudor City Place. The Sharansky Steps, named in honor of Soviet dissident Natan Sharansky, descend from the end of 43rd Street to Ralph Bunche Park at First Avenue, just across from the United Nations Secretariat Building. The corner of Tudor City Place and 43rd Street is known as John McKean Square, after a retired banker who became a tenants' rights advocate for the enclave in the 1970s.

Tudor City Place was once known as Prospect Place and remained a privately owned street long after the complex was completed. Prospect Place was renamed in 1948 because residents' mail kept getting diverted to similarly named streets in the Bronx and Brooklyn. The eastern sidewalk of Tudor City Place is lined with three 22-story buildings – Windsor, Tudor, and Prospect Towers – which collectively housed 1,600 families. The French Company developed the parks on the western side of the street, which act as a courtyard for all of the structures. The interior of the complex also includes four 10-story buildings that collectively housed 600 families; the 32-story Woodstock Tower; and the Hotel Tudor for short-term guests. The overpass that carries Tudor City Place above 42nd Street has historically been a popular location for photos of Manhattanhenge, during which the setting sun or the rising sun is aligned with Manhattan's east–west streets.

42nd Street cuts through the middle of Tudor City. When the complex was built, service roads on either side of 42nd Street sloped up to Tudor City Place. Traffic on 42nd Street had reached First Avenue via a 40-foot-wide cut through Prospect Hill. The service roads, which measured 30 feet wide, were both lined with buildings and were supported by retaining walls. At the time, 42nd Street dipped below Tudor City Place to reach First Avenue. The city government widened 42nd Street from 40 to 100 feet (30 m) and widened Tudor City Place from 37 to 60 feet (11 to 18 m) during the late 1940s and early 1950s. The tunnel under Tudor City Place was replaced by the present overpass in 1952. The city also constructed two stairways, one from either side of 42nd Street to the western side of Tudor City Place, to replace the service roads; each staircase contains 40 steps.

=== Parks ===
Tudor City's private parks, referred to as Tudor City Greens, were not part of French's original scheme. In 1926, the company wrote that the sites would become hotels when the other buildings' apartments had been leased out. By early 1927, French had made the parks a key part of the development's advertising campaign. The parks originally encompassed approximately 64,000 square feet (5,900 m^{2}; 1.5 acres; 0.59 ha) and followed the precedent of Gramercy Park in that only residents could receive keys for the parks. In addition, early promotional materials for Tudor City showed that the gardens were to be used for relaxation and contemplation, as in Gramercy Park, rather than for active recreation. Both parks were substantially narrowed, re-landscaped, and renovated after they were constructed; by the late 20th and early 21st centuries, only one of the parks' original metal lampposts survived.

Sheffield A. Arnold designed the northern park, which was completed in 1927. Measuring 104 by 200.75 feet (31.70 by 61.19 m) across, it was the first private park to be built in Manhattan in nearly a century. (Note: The most recently constructed private park in Manhattan had been Gramercy Park in 1831.) It included mature trees, gravel pathways, a fountain, lamps, benches, a pergola, and a lychgate; an iron fence also encircled the park. The southern private park became a miniature golf course with 18 holes, which was described in The New York Times as Manhattan's first outdoor mini-golf course. When a new course was opened across 41st Street in 1930, the southern park was redesigned similarly to the northern park, with a gatehouse, lampposts, and two gazebos. About 2,500 specimens of irises, representing 100 species, were planted in the southern park in 1941. The two parks retained a similar design through the 1980s, although the southern park had a sandbox instead of playground equipment. By the 1980s, the northern park contained lampposts, benches, an iron fence, bluestone pavement, and some trees, as well as playground equipment such as a swing set.

Tudor City also contains two public parks: the Mary O'Connor Playground to the north and the Tudor Grove Playground to the south. The Mary O'Connor Playground measures 117 by 86 feet (36 by 26 m) and opened as the Tudor City North Playground in July 1950; it was renamed in November 1991 after local activist Mary O'Connor. The New York City Department of Parks and Recreation rebuilt the playground between 1993 and 1995. The Tudor Grove Playground, measuring 100 by 84 feet (30 by 26 m), was rebuilt in 1995. Both public parks were reconstructed in 2022–2023.

== Buildings ==
Tudor City Buildings
Name	Address	Opened
Prospect Tower	45 Tudor City Place	September 30, 1927
The Manor	333 East 43rd Street	September 30, 1927
Tudor Tower	25 Tudor City Place	Summer 1928
The Cloister	321 East 43rd Street	Fall 1928
The Hermitage	330 East 43rd Street	Fall 1928
Haddon Hall	324 East 41st Street	January 1, 1929
Hardwicke Hall	314 East 41st Street	January 1, 1929
Hatfield House	304 East 41st Street	January 1, 1929
Woodstock Tower	320 East 42nd Street	May 1, 1929
Essex House	325 East 41st Street	October 6, 1929
Windsor Tower	5 Tudor City Place	January 1, 1930
Hotel Tudor	304 East 42nd Street	October 1, 1930
Tudor Gardens	2 Tudor City Place	January 1956

Tudor City was one of the world's first residential skyscraper complexes. The twelve original apartment buildings were developed by ten separate subsidiaries of the French Company, known as "units". Each unit was given a number between 1 and 11 according to when their respective buildings were constructed. For example, Prospect Tower was developed by the Tudor City First Unit, while the Hotel Tudor was developed by the Tudor City Eleventh Unit. There was no third unit.

The three large towers on Tudor City Place (Prospect Tower, Tudor Tower, and Windsor Tower), as well as Woodstock Tower and Hatfield House, were built as apartment hotels and were legally permitted to be taller than conventional apartment houses. Many of the units in the apartment houses were studio apartments. Because of the presence of the industrial buildings on First Avenue, the towers on Tudor City Place originally had very few windows facing east. The Manor, the Hermitage, the Cloister, Essex House, Haddon Hall, and Hardwicke Hall were all built as traditional apartment buildings. The smaller apartment buildings' units ranged in size from studios to six rooms.

Tudor City's original shops included three restaurants (providing room service for a fee), grocery, liquor, and drug stores, barber shop, and beauty parlor. Services included a post office, indoor playground, private nursery, maids, laundry and valet service, private guards, theater ticket agency, garage, a furniture repair and rug cleaning service, and a radio engineer who would repair and connect aerials. These services were intended to attract a variety of tenants, from bachelors to families. The enclave also contained such amenities as an ice-skating rink, tennis courts, photographers' darkrooms, a library, babysitting service, and bowling alley. Prospect Tower and Tudor Tower both contained two rooftop decks, while the Manor contained another roof deck; there was also a water playground for children. The New York Times wrote in 2005 that the complex still hosted numerous shops, such as "a cleaner's, nail parlor, salon, bike shop, two delis, flower shop, post office, toy-balloon store and pewter dealer".

Tudor City
1 Hatfield House
2 Hardwicke Hall
3 Hadden Hall
4 Tudor Gardens
5 Windsor Tower
6 Hotel Tudor (Westgate Hotel)
7 Essex House
8 Prospect Hill Apartments
9 Tudor Tower
10 Woodstock Tower
11 The Hermitage
12 Prospect Tower
13 The Cloister
14 The Manor
15 Church of the Covenant (preexisting building)
16 337 East 41st Street (preexisting building)
17 336–340 East 43rd Street (preexisting buildings)
18 Ford Foundation Center for Social Justice (outside historic district)
19 UN headquarters (outside historic district)

=== South side of 41st Street ===
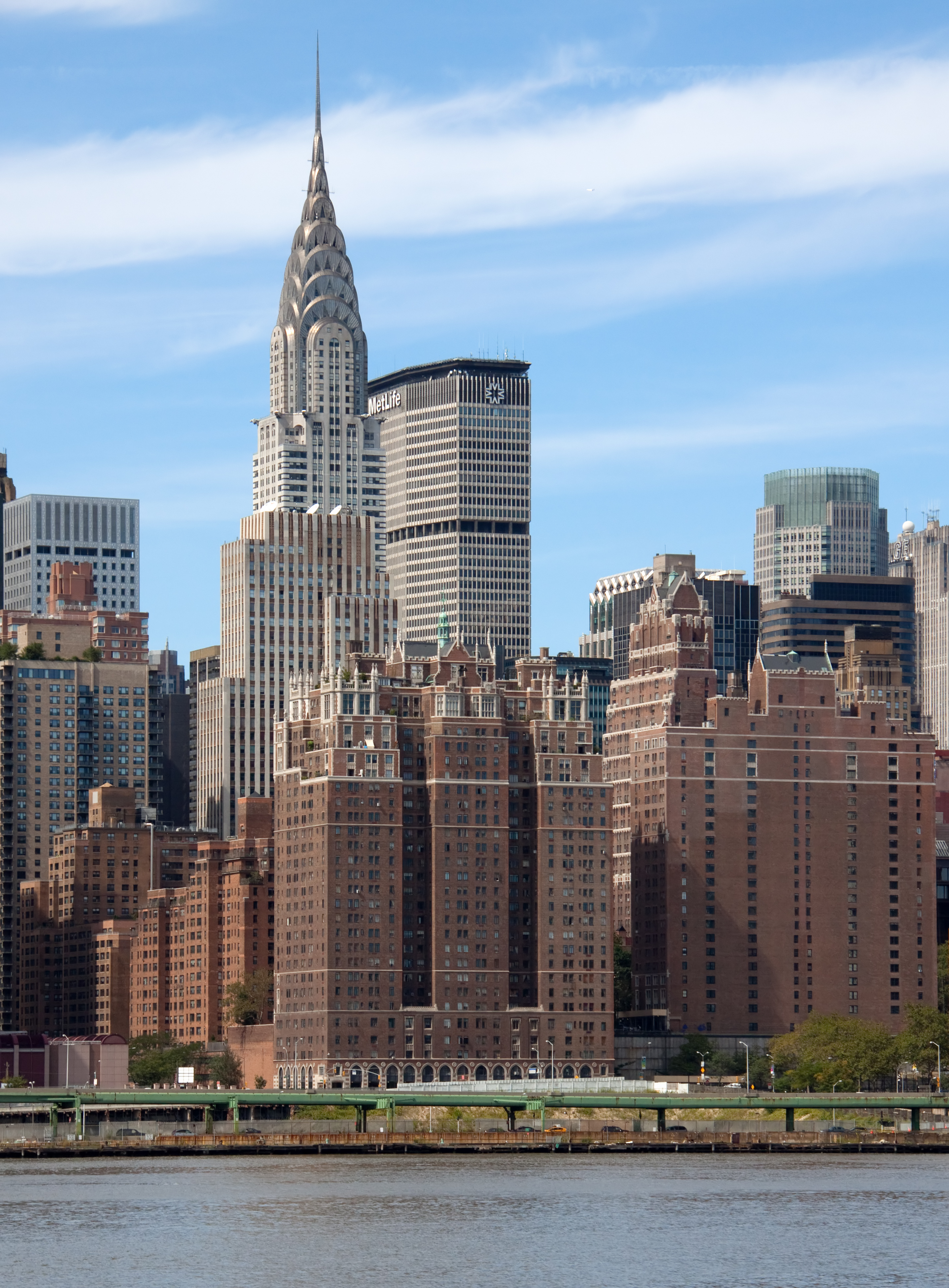
Windsor Tower (center), Tudor Tower (right), Woodstock Tower (between them), and 2 Tudor City Place (bottom left), with the Chrysler Building and the MetLife Building in the background

On the south side of 41st Street west of Tudor City Place are Hatfield House, Hardwicke Hall, and Haddon Hall, which comprise Tudor City's eighth unit; these structures are respectively located at 304, 314, and 324 East 41st Street from west to east. All three structures were named after rural English manors, namely Hatfield House, Hardwick Hall, and Haddon Hall. The westernmost structure, Hatfield House, is 15 stories tall, while the other two structures are 11 stories tall. The facades of all three buildings are clad with stone at their bases, brick on the upper stories, and water towers or mechanical towers on their roofs. Haddon Hall was built with three penthouses and 43 apartments with three to five rooms; Hardwicke Hall had three penthouses and 52 apartments with up to five rooms; and Hatfield House contained 87 apartments, many with only one room. Haddon Hall, Hardwicke Hall, and Hatfield House form a single co-op and, since 1959, have had a single entrance.

On the southwestern corner of 41st Street and Tudor City Place is a 14-story red-brick apartment building. Originally known as Tudor Gardens, it is located at 2 Tudor City Place. Designed by William Hohauser, it was constructed from 1954 to 1956, over two decades after the rest of the complex had been finished. There were originally 333 or 334 apartments. The apartments are grouped into two sections and separated by a glass-enclosed lobby, designed in a post-World War II style. Each unit was built with two to five-and-a-half rooms, for a total of 1,110 rooms. Of the original apartments, 25 opened out onto a private garden, while 50 had their own terraces; there were also three "professional offices" at ground level. The building was planned with a 300-space parking garage beneath it.

The southeastern corner of 41st Street and Tudor City Place contains Windsor Tower, the complex's ninth unit, which carries an address of 5 Tudor City Place. At 22 stories tall, Windsor Tower is the complex's largest building. Of the three buildings on the east side of Tudor City Place, Windsor Tower is the only one that extends the entire depth of the block to First Avenue on the east, where there is a pedestrian arcade at ground level. The building has a brick-and-terracotta facade and is topped by a weather vane. In the late 20th century, Windsor Tower was variously cited as containing 787 or 790 apartments.

=== 41st to 42nd Streets ===
Essex House at 325 East 41st Street, the complex's tenth unit, is a 10-story building on the north side of the street. The structure consists of two wings flanking a light court, which contains an entrance portico at ground level. The facade is largely made of brick, but the first story is clad with limestone, and the building's corners contain terracotta bays. Essex House was built with 100 apartments, containing one to six rooms each.

Just east of Essex House are the Prospect Hill Apartments at 333 East 41st Street, designed by Toensfeldt-Boughton, who also served as the building's engineers. The six-story structure predated the rest of the Tudor City by a few months. As such, unlike the other apartment buildings in Tudor City, it was largely designed with simple brick walls and fire escapes; the stone doorway was the only part of the building designed in the Tudor Revival style. The Prospect Hill Apartments originally housed 36 families.

To the west of Essex House is the Hotel Tudor at 304 East 42nd Street, which was Tudor City's eleventh unit. The hotel is 20 stories tall and contains a facade of textured bricks, topped by a pavilion. The main entrance is on 42nd Street, though the hotel extends the entire depth of the block to 41st Street. The Hotel Tudor was the only building in the complex that was not intended to house long-term tenants, as well as the only one not designed in the Tudor Revival style. It contains setbacks that more closely resembled those in Art Deco–style buildings. The Hotel Tudor contained 619 units with one to three rooms; a 100-seat cafeteria; and a music room. Some of the units on the upper floors had private terraces behind the setbacks. The hotel has variously been known as the Crowne Plaza at the United Nations, the Hilton New York Grand Central, and the Hilton Manhattan East over the years. Since 2018, Westgate Resorts has operated the former Hotel Tudor as the 300-room Westgate New York City.

Woodstock Tower, the complex's eleventh unit, is located at 320 East 42nd Street. At 32 stories, it is the tallest building in Tudor City. Woodstock Tower contains a limestone base, which was increased to four stories in 1952 after the adjacent section of 42nd Street was lowered. The tower also has several setbacks, and it was originally topped by a flèche. Woodstock Tower was built with 454 apartments. Most of these were single-room units, but the upper stories contained some two- and three-story apartments.

The block west of Tudor City Place contains two preexisting buildings. There is a brownstone row house at 337 East 41st Street, built in 1870 and designed by Hubert & Pirsson. It is the only surviving row house of nineteen on the block. Just northwest of the row house is the Church of the Covenant at 306–310 East 42nd Street, constructed between 1871 and 1872. The eastern half of the church was demolished in 1927 and replaced with a Tudor-style church house that complemented the design of the apartment houses; the church's granite base dates to 1950, when 42nd Street was lowered.

Tudor Tower, the enclave's fourth unit, is a 22-story building at 25 Tudor City Place, on the eastern sidewalk from 41st to 42nd Street. It has a brick facade with stained glass, leaded glass, and cream-colored facade decorations. The building was built with 442 apartments.

=== 42nd to 43rd Streets ===
On the south side of 43rd Street is the Hermitage, the complex's sixth unit, a 10-story structure at 330 East 43rd Street. The first four stories are clad in limestone and terracotta, while the upper floors are topped by a square pavilion. The building was constructed with three penthouses, as well as 61 apartments with up to five rooms.

Just east of the Hermitage are three brownstone row houses at 336–338 East 43rd Street, all designed by John Sexton in the Italianate style and built around 1870. They were part of a group of six row houses that predated Tudor City's construction.

The east side of Tudor City Place, between 42nd and 43rd Streets, contains the complex's first unit, the 22-story Prospect Tower at 45 Tudor City Place. The building has a brick facade, which is divided horizontally into three sections and is ornamented with yellow sandstone and terracotta details. The eastern elevation of the facade originally only had two bays of windows, which illuminated the corridors. The roof contains a neon sign with the words "Tudor City". The building was built with 402 apartments of one or two rooms, as well as duplex studio apartments on the top two floors.

=== North side of 43rd Street ===
The Cloister, the fifth unit in Tudor City, is located at 321 East 43rd Street. The building is ten stories tall and has a stone base with a four-story entryway made of stone and terracotta. The upper stories are clad in brick, except for terracotta decorations on the ninth and tenth stories. There is a decorative water tower pavilion above the roof. The Cloister was built with six penthouses, each with a separate roof garden, as well as 142 apartments with up to four rooms. As of 2011, it had 143 apartments.

The Manor at 333 East 43rd Street was Tudor City's second unit. It is also ten stories high and is mostly clad with brick; the corners of the facade contain terracotta ornamentation patterned after that of the Sutton Place estate in Surrey, England. The building originally had nine penthouses (each with a terrace on the roof), as well as 215 apartments, which ranged between two and four rooms, with one or two bathrooms. As of 2011, it had 215 apartments.

== Architecture and design ==
All of Tudor City's architects and designers were employees of the Fred F. French Company, including chief architect H. Douglas Ives. From the beginning, the project was referred to as Tudor City, after its style of architectural ornament. Known as Tudor Revival, the style mixed the Tudor and Elizabethan styles from 16th-century England. In early 20th-century America, these architectural motifs had come to symbolize the comforts of suburban living. Tudor City was conceived as an urban response to the suburban flight of the middle class, and therefore was designed with the architectural forms expected in a suburban development. By the time of Tudor City, the Neo-Tudor style had already been used on a limited number of urban apartment buildings, including Hudson View Gardens in Washington Heights, Manhattan, and several erected by the Fred F. French Company. The use of the Tudor and Elizabethan styles also contrasted with the increasing popularity of Art Deco architecture in New York City, giving each building an "old world" feeling.

=== Exteriors ===
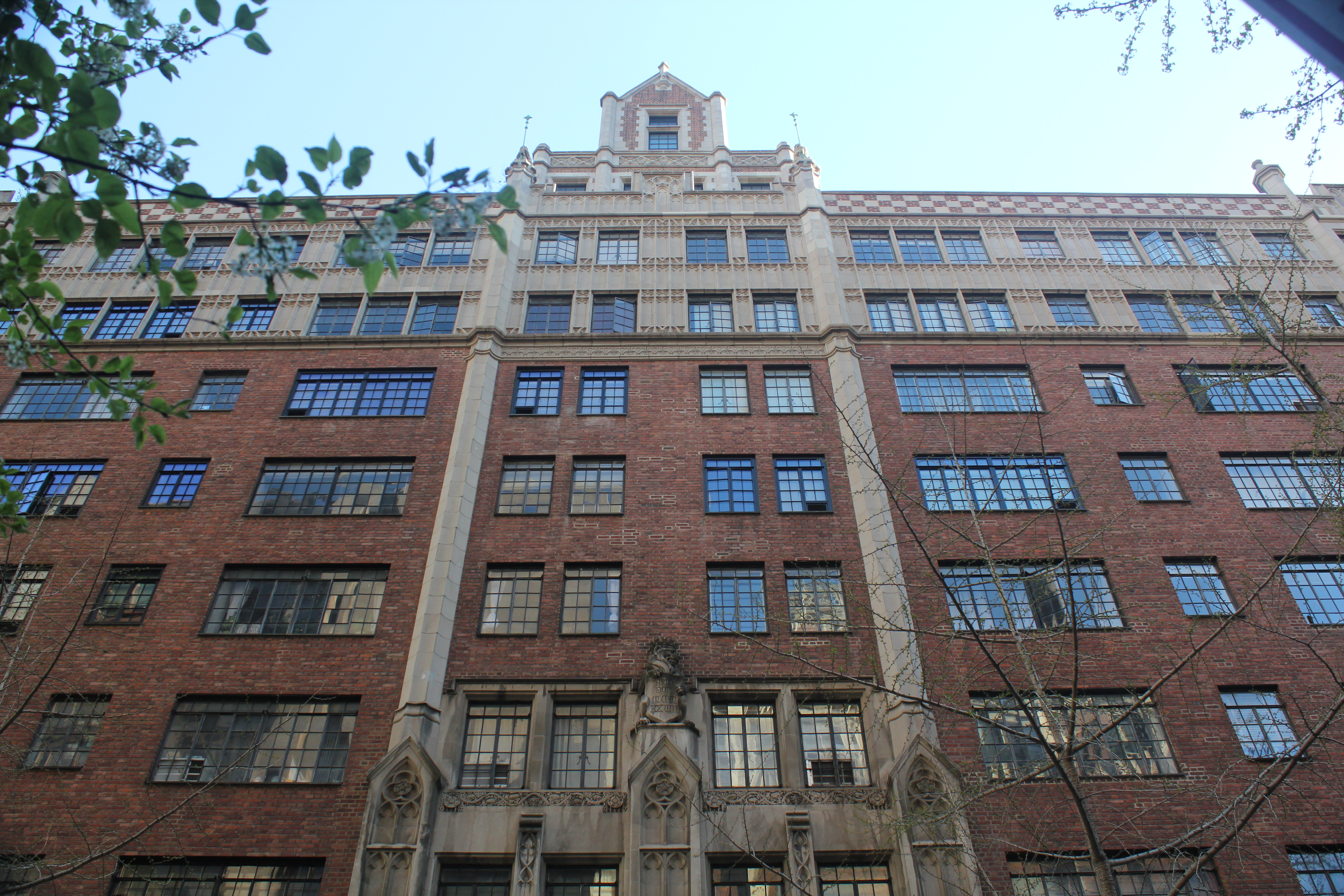
The facade of the Cloister, one of Tudor City's buildings

Generally, the lower stories of each building were clad in sandstone and limestone, while the upper stories were clad in reddish-brown brick with terracotta trim. The complex's designers used Tudor Revival details, including oriel windows, bay windows, four-centered arches, quatrefoils, fish bladder moldings, balustrades, Tudor roses, portcullises (a symbol of the Tudor sovereigns), and lions. The tops of each building have towers, chimneys, gables, parapets, and finials. Carved or cast stone and terracotta detail was used extensively. There are also allegorical stained glass windows on the first story of each building.

The wooden entrance doors are carved with such Tudor forms as linenfold panels and fish-bladder tracery, and decorated with hardware based on sixteenth-century precedents. Public lobbies include half-timbering, carved woodwork, beamed ceilings, arched openings, plaster friezes and rosettes, and Tudor-style fixtures and furnishings. Although the buildings are unified by the consistent use of Tudor detail, there is a significant amount of variety since no two buildings have the same decoration. The stone, terracotta, woodwork, ironwork, and glass used were of the highest quality. Windsor, Tudor, and Prospect towers all contain three-story windows on their highest stories; the tops of these towers also contain columns with gargoyles and griffins.

=== Interiors ===
Like the facades of most of the buildings, the lobbies contained Tudor-style detail. Among the surviving Tudor-style lobbies in the complex are that of Essex House, as well as that of Tudor Tower, which was described in The New York Times as having the "hue of a chapel, with stained-glass windows" depicting the seal of New York City.

In contrast to the facades and lobbies, the interiors of the apartments had contemporary appliances and amenities. These included garbage incinerators, hookups to radio stations, and 1,000 Frigidaire refrigerators. Many of the apartment houses' units had Murphy beds and serving pantries but no stoves. They were marketed to single people and childless couples who previously would have lived in brownstones. Other units were used as pieds-à-terre for businesspeople and professional workers. At one time these efficiencies developed a reputation as "love nests" for mistresses and prostitutes. After the wiring in the buildings was replaced in 1964, the French Company installed electric cooktops in the studio apartments.

As co-ops, some of the single-family units have been combined into larger apartments. These buildings also included a few apartments with full kitchens, and penthouses with roof terraces. The tops of Windsor, Tudor, and Prospect towers collectively contained 14 penthouse apartments, some of which contained outdoor terraces. These penthouses attracted residents such as actor Charlton Heston and lawyer Brooks Thomas; in the 2010s, some of the penthouses were still occupied by rent-regulated tenants.

== Community ==
From 1934 to 1969, residents published their own magazine. One issue was published every month and was distributed to residents for free. Originally published by W. L. Lightfoot as the Tudor City Service, the magazine was renamed the Tudor City View in 1938; the magazine was unaffiliated with the French Company. Warren C. Eberle was the magazine's longtime publisher, printing 351 issues from January 1941 to May 1969. The magazine reported on events in residents' lives, including weddings, births, and deaths, in addition to other society news stories, such as residents' vacations to remote locales. Under Eberle's leadership, the magazine also printed stories about Tudor City's history.

There were other organizations within Tudor City as well. These included a camera club, a debate forum, and a "Tudor City Club" where residents could play games, attend events, or read magazines. The Tudor City Tennis Club attracted players such as Pancho Segura, Bobby Riggs, Bill Tilden, Rudy Vallée, and Katharine Hepburn from the 1930s to the 1950s, and the courts hosted the United States Pro Championship for the only time in 1936. The United Nations Tennis Club also used Tudor City's tennis courts following World War II.

== Rooftop sign ==
The Fred F. French Company advertised Tudor City heavily until 1943. Included in the early campaign were two rooftop signs composed of incandescent light bulbs, one on either side of 42nd Street – on the north roof of Tudor Tower and the south roof of Prospect Tower – that could be seen from blocks away. The signs measured about 30 by 50 feet (9.1 by 15.2 m). Tudor Tower's sign was obscured by the Woodstock and was removed c. 1933.

The sole remaining sign is that atop Prospect Tower, which was retrofitted with neon in 1939. After falling in a storm in September 1949, it was replaced. By the early 21st century, the replacement sign had lost its lighting tube several years prior and was a neglected, rusting iron shell. In 1995, the co-op board of Prospect Tower requested the LPC's permission to remove the sign, calling it ugly and dangerous, but the commission refused, on the ground of historical significance. As of 2020, the sign's steel support structure and pan letters have undergone a complete restoration but plans to re-illuminate the sign have not materialized.

== Critical reception ==
Immediately after the project was announced, an article in The New York American stated that "the decadent section east of Third Ave. is resurrecting". An editor for The New York Times wrote that "New York is promised – or threatened with, as the event may prove – a vast community settlement overlooking the East River from the high ledge at the foot of Forty-second Street". The Christian Science Monitor compared the proposed development to the luxurious residences along Riverside Drive on the Upper West Side of Manhattan. In designating the buildings as city landmarks, the New York City Landmarks Preservation Commission described Tudor City as "a highly successful attempt to urbanize" medieval architecture, and the commission cited the complex as having inspired similar apartment complexes. Similarly, the buildings were added to the National Register of Historic Places because of "Fred F. French's plan to build an apartment complex with a unified Tudor design theme".

According to author and architect Robert A. M. Stern, the complex was French's vision of a "dense urban suburbia". In the words of architectural historian Andrew Dolkart, the site was "a complex of apartment houses and residence hotels that would be so convenient, well-planned, well-built, and well-priced that middle-class families and single people would be more attracted to these Manhattan buildings than to houses or apartments in the outer boroughs or the suburbs." A reporter for The New York Observer wrote in 2001 that "because of its location between the U.N. and Grand Central, Tudor City is a particular kind of place". In 2014, the New York Daily News characterized Tudor City as "obscure and mysterious to those who live beyond its borders". Justin Davidson wrote of Tudor City for New York magazine in 2017: "Though the city has evolved around it, a verdant retreat in midtown Manhattan still seems like an incongruous apparition."

== See also ==
- List of New York City Designated Landmarks in Manhattan from 14th to 59th Streets
- National Register of Historic Places listings in Manhattan from 14th to 59th Streets
