= Murray Hill Neighborhood Association =

Community organization in Manhattan, New York City

- Abbreviation: MHNA
- Formation: 1960 (as the Murray Hill Committee)
- Founder: Group of 12 homeowners
- Type: Nonprofit neighborhood association
- Purpose: Historic preservation, beautification, community advocacy
- Headquarters: Murray Hill, Manhattan, New York City
- Location: New York City
- Website: murrayhillnyc.org

The Murray Hill Neighborhood Association (MHNA) is a neighborhood organization in the Murray Hill neighborhood of Manhattan, New York City. Originally founded as the Murray Hill Committee by a small group of residents to "uphold the residential character" of their neighborhood by opposing a plan to widen 36th and 37th Streets, the organization has since grown to have over 1,000 members and become one of the city's most active civic associations. The MHNA has played a major role in preserving the historic character of the neighborhood, organized community events including an annual street fair, and installed and maintained trees and landscaping on public streets and sidewalks.

== History ==
=== 1950s to 1960s ===
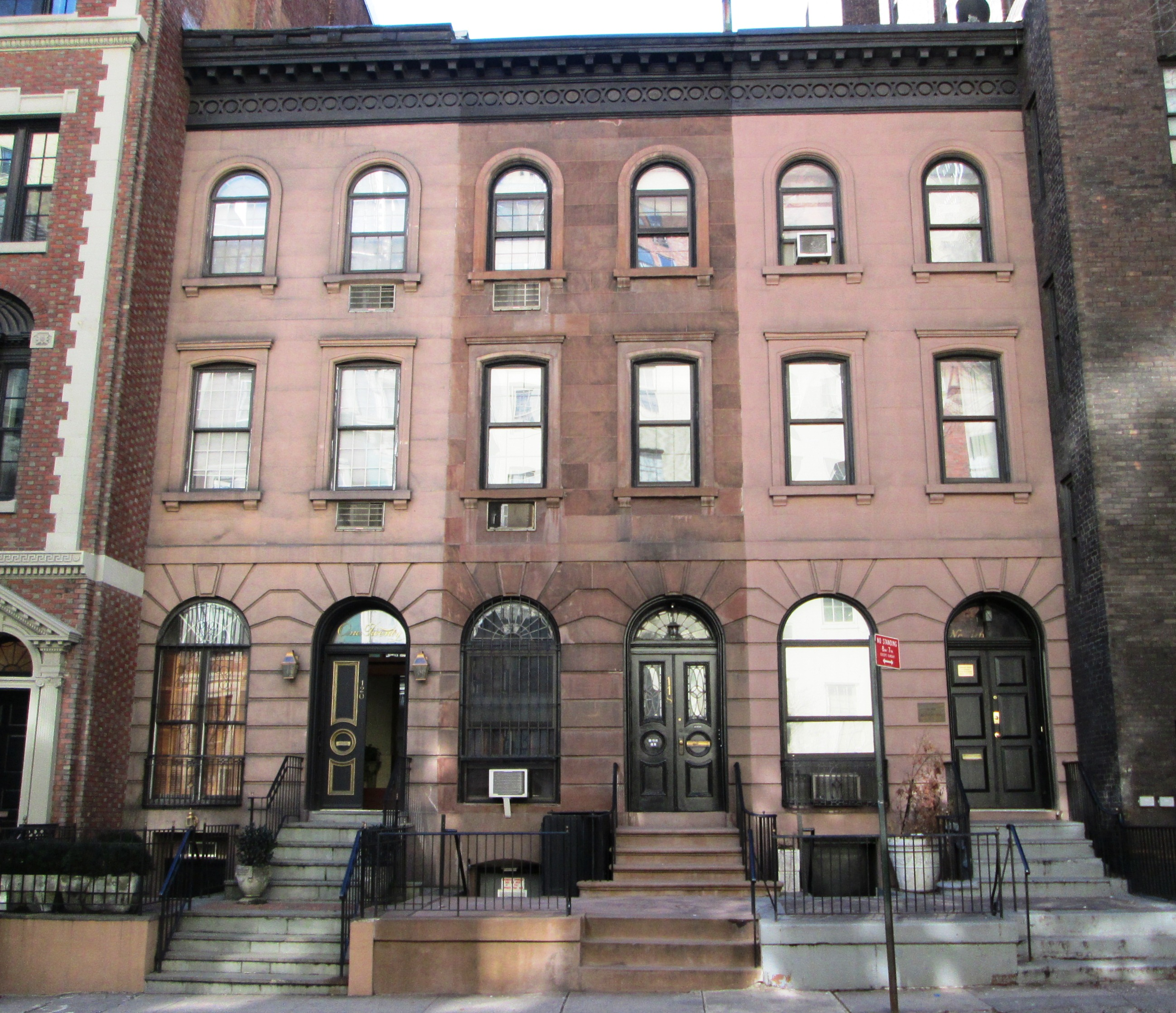
Brownstones in Murray Hill constructed during the 1850s

In the late 1950s, Manhattan Borough President Hulan Jack proposed a plan to widen 36th and 37th Streets between Third and Eleventh Avenues to improve the flow of traffic across Manhattan between the Queens–Midtown and Lincoln Tunnels. A group called the Murray Hill Committee was formed to "uphold the residential character" of their neighborhood and opposed the plan, which would have removed the stoops of brownstones, replaced mature street trees with younger saplings, and removed a lawn in front of the Morgan Library. Residents thought that the street widenings would decrease home values and attract more traffic to the area.

The Murray Hill Committee, which was initially led by John Throckmorton, sent a telegram protesting the plan to Jack and New York City Mayor Robert F. Wagner Jr. and subsequently met with Jack. Opponents of the plan suggested that robust enforcement of no standing regulations could be used as an alternative to provide additional moving lanes for traffic. Another early member of the Murray Hill Committee was Eleanor Clark French, who served as vice chairman of the New York State Democratic Committee. French spoke out against the plan at hearings and also voiced her opinion on the matter as a letter to the editor of The New York Times. The street widenings were also opposed by the East 49th Street Association, including Reverend Warren Ost, the head of the group's traffic committee. (Note: Now called the Turtle Bay Association, the East 49th Street Association was originally formed in 1957 to protest the widening of 49th Street in Turtle Bay.)

In 1965, the committee opposed a proposed rezoning of Madison Avenue between 36th and 38th Streets, which could have led to the demolition of a 45-room mansion dating back to the nineteenth century in order to construct an office building on the site. (Note: 231 Madison Avenue (the Phelps Stokes – J. P. Morgan Jr. House) was designated as a New York City Landmark in 1965, but the landmark status was removed in 1974 as a result of a legal challenge by the property owner. The building was redesignated as a New York City Landmark in 2002, after it had been purchased by the Morgan Library.) That same year, the committee also joined with other local groups in opposing the opening of a heliport on top of the PanAm Building, and called for the release of a disaster plan that had been prepared by the police in the event of a helicopter crash. By then, the Murray Hill Committee had grown to a membership of over 100 property owners and residents. The organization had also been successful in prohibiting trucks from using residential streets in its neighborhood.

=== 1970s to 1980s ===
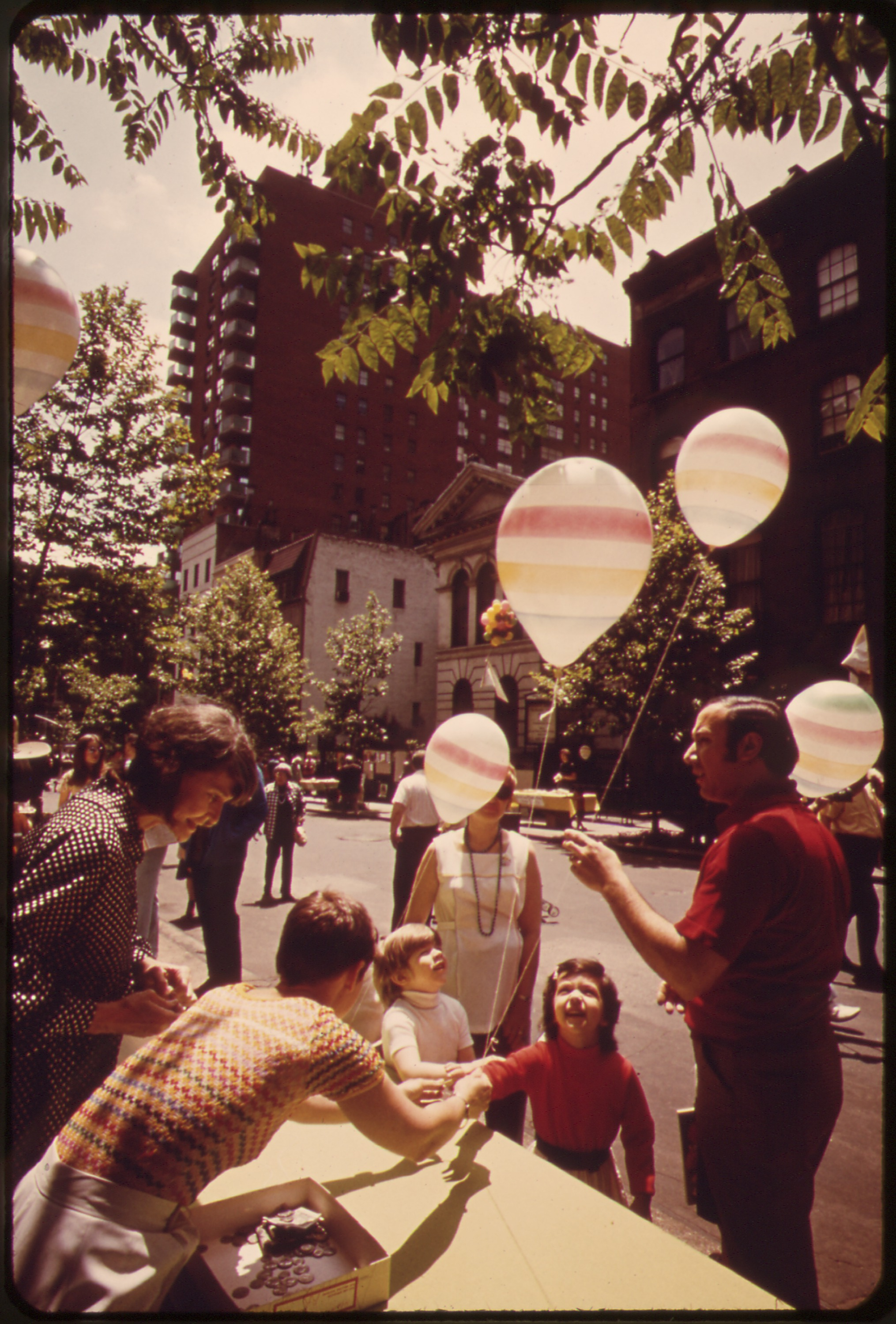
Block party on East 35th Street in 1973

In June 1973, the Murray Hill Committee held its first block party with the theme of "The Greening of Murray Hill". Proceeds from the annual block parties were used to add street trees and to plant flowers on the Park Avenue malls between 34th and 39th Streets. The block party held in June 1976, which included 16 walking tours of historical points of interest in the neighborhood, attracted 25,000 attendees. The block parties were originally held on 35th Street between Madison and Lexington Avenues. By 2008, the annual event had moved to Park Avenue between 34th and 40th Streets.

As part of the United States Bicentennial, the organization organized an exhibition of historical photographs showing how the Murray Hill neighborhood had changed over the prior century. The original exhibit was displayed in June 1976 at the gallery of the Community Church of New York and again from July 1976 through September 1976 at the branch of the Independence Savings Bank on Lexington Avenue at 34th Street. The collection was restored and updated to include new photos and architectural histories of each site for a subsequent exhibition titled "Murray Hill: 1750–2008" at the CUNY Graduate Center in 2009.

During the 1970s and 1980s, the association focused heavily on historic preservation and downzoning efforts. In 1977, the Murray Hill Committee issued its first publication, An Historic District in Murray Hill, which detailed the history of properties located along a block with a row of brownstones—35th Street between Park and Lexington Avenues—and also included a history of the surrounding neighborhood and information about how a historic district designation would affect property owners.

The Murray Hill Committee sponsored a public hearing on prostitution in 1977, gathering experts and community members with the intention of introducing legislation to address the problem of street prostitution. The committee later sought to legalize prostitution and regulate the solicitation of prostitutes to "safe" zones so it would not occur on the street.

In 1982, the Murray Hill Committee gained the support of Manhattan Community Board 6 in its effort to have the New York City Landmarks Preservation Commission designate a historic district in Murray Hill to prevent the construction of sliver buildings. The committee originally sought the designation of a historic district covering about 200 buildings on the blocks between Third and Madison Avenues from 35th to 39th Streets. The organization, which had since become a group having over 1,000 members, successfully advocated for contextual rezoning of the area's midblocks in 1986. The rezoning blocked the construction of a planned high-rise on 35th Street between Park and Madison Avenues, which was to have condominiums in a tower above new facilities for the Community Church of New York. The Murray Hill Committee had originally opposed the height of the proposed structure, which was to be over 50 stories tall.

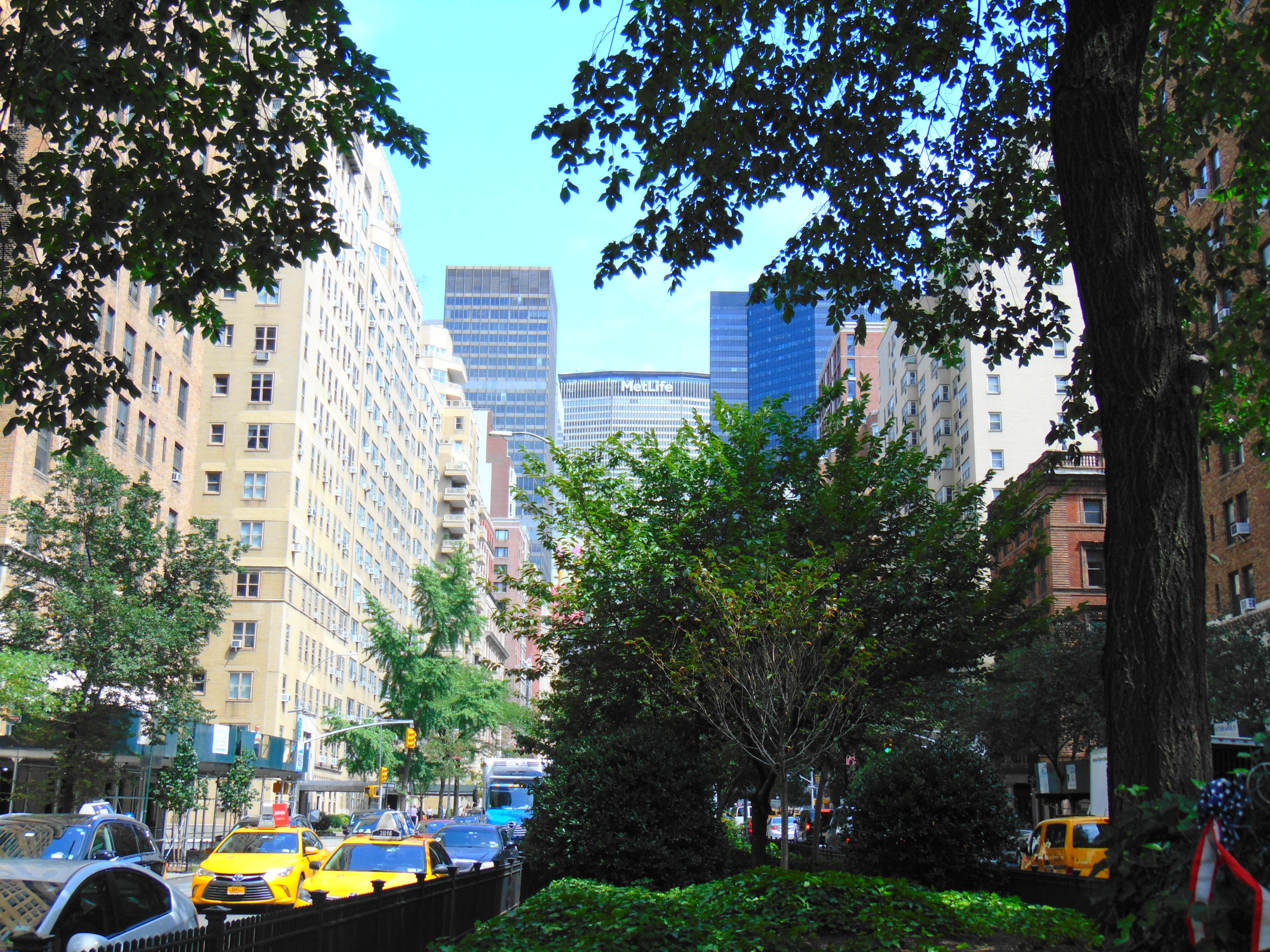
View from a Park Avenue mall in 2018

A new group called Patrons of Park Avenue (POPA) was formed within the Murray Hill Committee in 1982 with the objective of beautifying the public spaces on the segment of Park Avenue from 32nd to 42nd Streets. The initial objective of POPA involved restoring wrought iron fencing around the malls between 34th and 39th Streets by installing embankments for trees, groundcover and seasonal plantings as well as developing a maintenance program for the malls. In subsequent phases of work, POPA intended to beautify the ramps and Park Avenue Viaduct located north of 39th Street as well as the ramps leading to the Park Avenue Tunnel south of 34th Street.

=== 1990s to present ===
In the early 1990s, the Murray Hill Committee was considered to be one of the most active civic associations in New York City. The name of the organization was officially changed to the Murray Hill Neighborhood Association (MHNA) in 1995. The MHNA was the recipient of a Grassroots Preservation Award in 2002 from the Historic Districts Council in recognition for its persistent efforts to designate a historic district covering an area in Murray Hill, a process that the organization had started in the early 1980s. The Murray Hill Historic District was designated by the New York City Landmarks Preservation Commission in 2002 and extended in 2004.

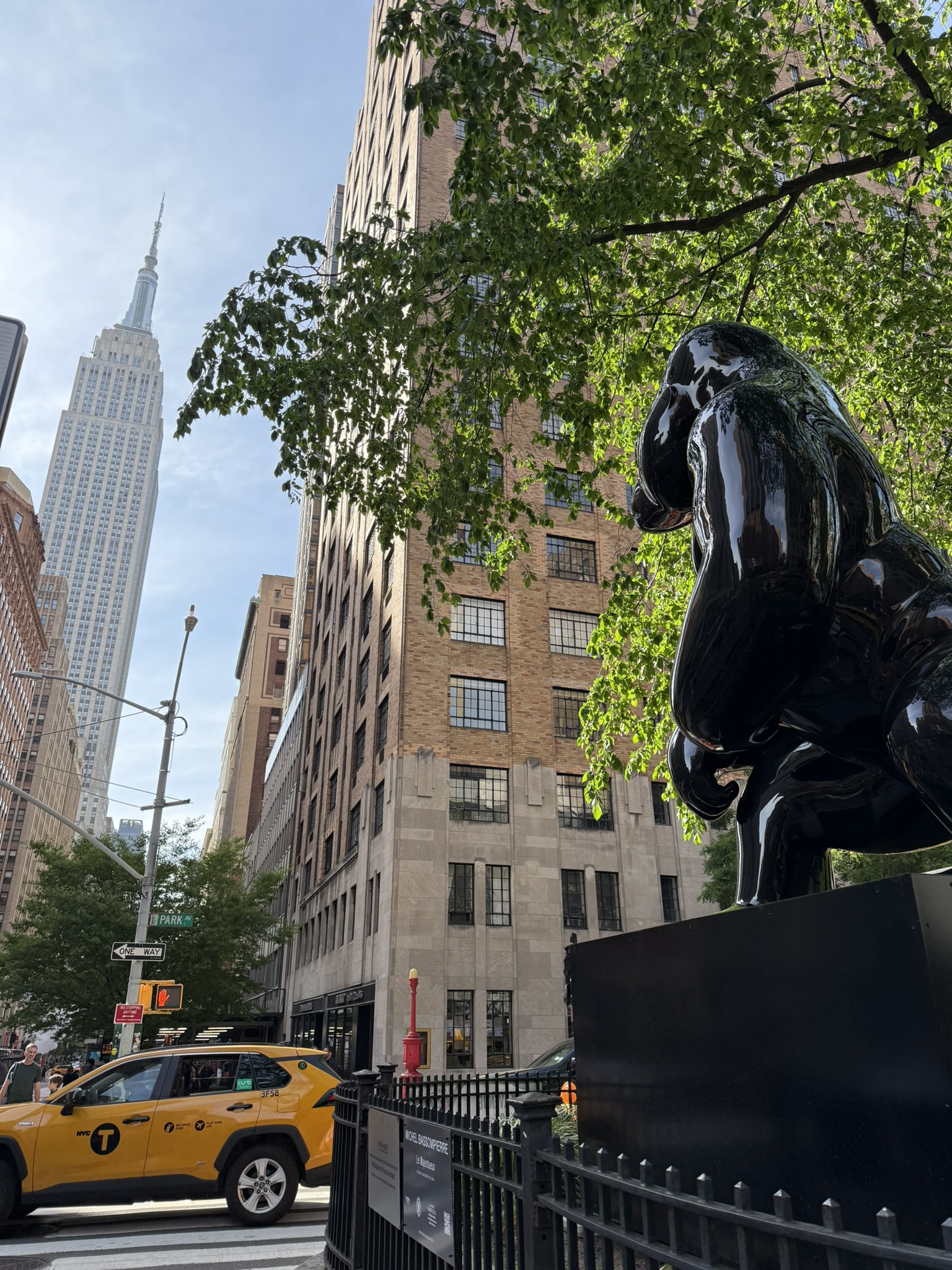
Sculpture by Michel Bassompierre on Park Avenue at 34th Street in 2025

The MHNA began supporting temporary art installations on the Park Avenue malls in 2022 (as part of its POPA committee) through the New York City Department of Parks and Recreation's "Art in the Parks" program. The inaugural exhibition ran from February 2022 to February 2023 and included nine polygonal shaped animal sculptures by artist Idriss B. between 34th and 38th Streets. Subsequent art installations along Park Avenue have included exhibits by Carole A. Feuerman (April 2023–April 2024), Bruno Catalano (May 2024–May 2025), Michel Bassompierre (May 2025–May 2026), and Dorit Levinstein (May 2026–).

In 2025, MHNA opposed proposed car restrictions and a busway on 34th Street, arguing that the plan would divert traffic onto narrow residential side streets in Murray Hill. MHNA had previously opposed a proposed plan for a transitway along 34th Street in 2010, which would have involved the conversion of the block between Fifth and Sixth Avenues into a pedestrian plaza, also asserting that the plan would divert traffic onto residential streets.

== Preservation efforts ==
The MHNA has played a major role in landmark designations in Murray Hill. Notable achievements include:

- Supporting the individual landmarking of multiple buildings, including the Morgan Library & Museum and Sniffen Court Historic District.
- Advocating for the creation of the Murray Hill Historic District
- Contributing to the listing of the Murray Hill Historic District on the National Register of Historic Places in 2003, with a major expansion in 2013.

== Activities ==
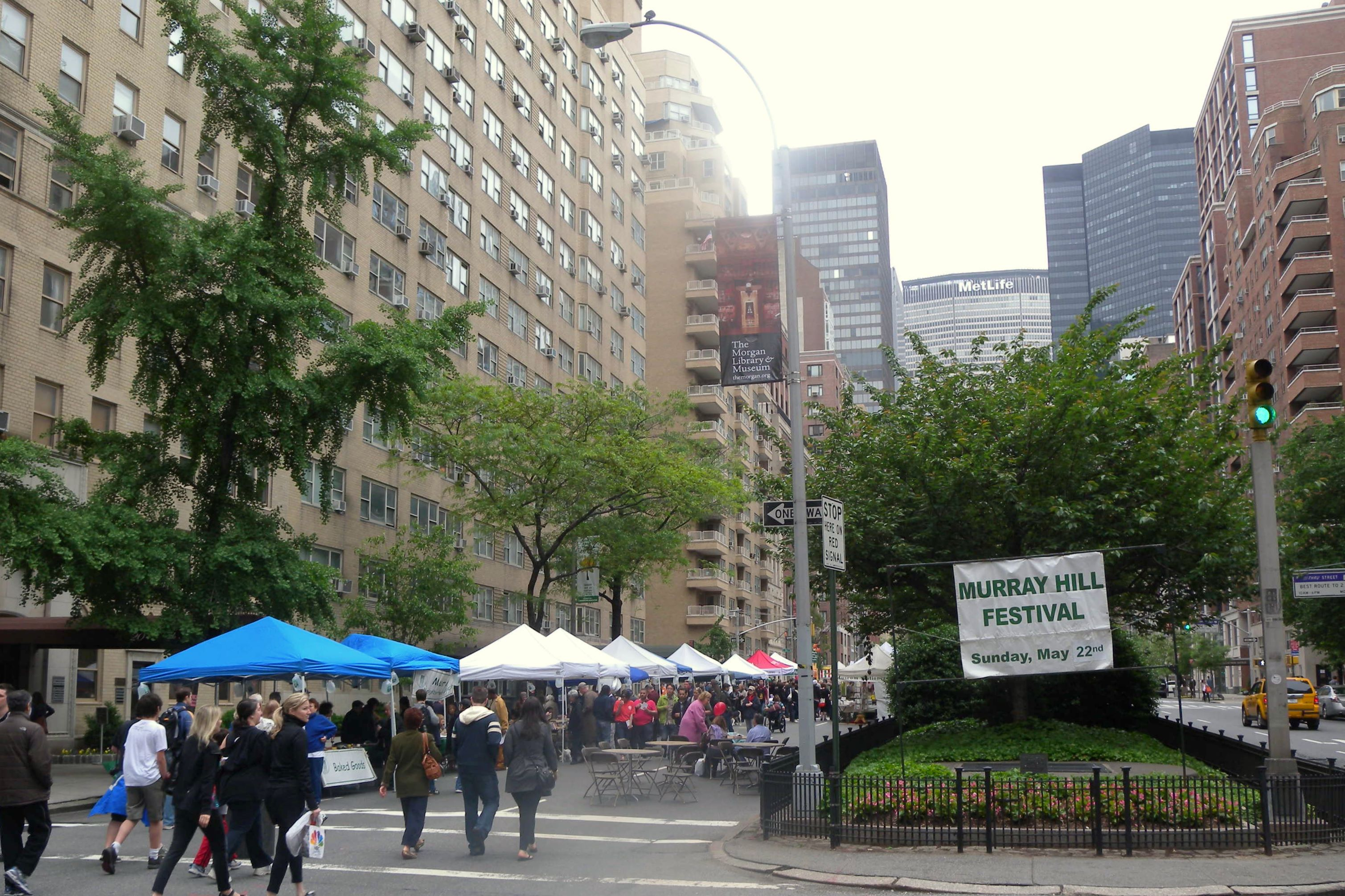
2011 Murray Hill Festival on Park Avenue

The association organizes and supports:

- The annual Park Avenue Day street fair (originally started as a block party in 1973)
- Historic walking tours of the neighborhood
- Tree planting and maintenance
- Beautification of the Park Avenue malls, including temporary art installations
- Seasonal clean-up events and holiday decorations

The MHNA is also active in current transportation and quality-of-life issues.

== See also ==
- Murray Hill, Manhattan
- Murray Hill Historic District
