= Murray Hill, Manhattan =

Murray Hill
- Neighborhood
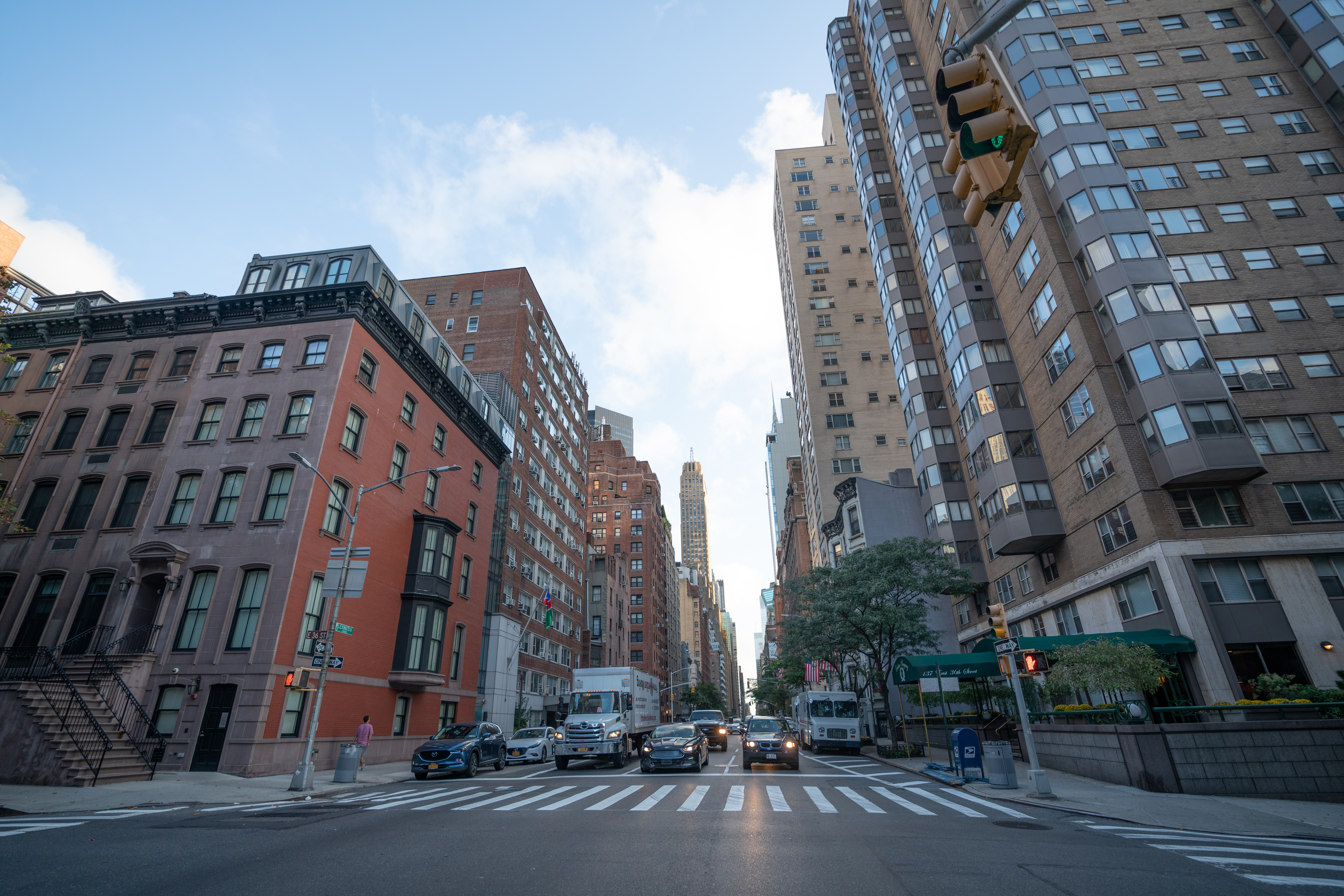
- Mid-19th-century brownstones and 20th-century high-rises along Lexington Avenue
- Location in New York City
- Coordinates: 40.748°N 73.978°W
- Country: United States
- State: New York
- City: New York City
- Borough: Manhattan
- Community District: Manhattan 6

Area
  - Total: 0.249 sq mi (0.64 km^{2})

Population (2010)
  - Total: 10,864
  - Density: 43,600/sq mi (16,800/km^{2})

Ethnicity
  - White: 66.6%
  - Asian: 16.2
  - Hispanic: 9.9
  - Black: 4.8
  - Others: 2.5

Economics
  - Median income: $117,677
- Time zone: UTC−05:00 (Eastern)
  - Summer (DST): UTC−04:00 (EDT)
- ZIP Codes: 10016, 10017
- Area codes: 212, 332, 646, and 917

Murray Hill is a neighborhood on the east side of Manhattan in New York City. Murray Hill is generally bordered to the east by the East River or Kips Bay and to the west by Midtown Manhattan, though the exact boundaries are disputed. Murray Hill is situated on a steep glacial hill that peaked between Lexington Avenue and Broadway. It was named after Robert Murray, the head of the Murray family, a mercantile family that settled in the area in the 18th century.

The Murray farm was formed before 1762 and existed until at least the early 19th century. Through the 19th century, Murray Hill was relatively isolated from the rest of New York City, which at the time was centered in Lower Manhattan. Murray Hill became an upscale neighborhood during the 20th century. Today, it contains several cultural institutions such as the Morgan Library & Museum, as well as missions and consulates to the nearby United Nations headquarters. The neighborhood also contains architectural landmarks, some of which are in the Murray Hill Historic District, a city and national historic district.

Murray Hill is part of Manhattan Community District 6, and its primary ZIP Codes are 10016 and 10017. It is patrolled by the 17th Precinct of the New York City Police Department.

== Geography ==
Murray Hill derives its name from Robert Murray (1721–1786), a Scottish-born merchant, whose family had a large estate in what is now the modern-day neighborhood. The modern neighborhood was once an abrupt, steep-sided mound of glacial till typical of Manhattan Island's still-unmodified post-glacial terrain. It was described by one author as a "hill of the rudest and most heterogeneous mixture of stone and gravel and boulders, cemented together into a matrix of almost impenetrable density ..., crowning the underlying schist. ... It had a natural rise from 34th Street, sinking towards 42nd Street and reaching from Lexington Avenue to Broadway." The hill still exists, with an incline from 31st to 35th Streets, as well as a decline north of 37th Street.

During the 19th century, modern-day Murray Hill was "uptown" with the city ending with the reservoir at Fifth Avenue and 42nd Street covering what today is the New York Public Library Main Branch and Bryant Park. To the north was for the most part farmland. A stream called t'Oude Wrack (Dutch for "Old Wreck") ran across the area, emptying into Sunfish Pond, located at the present-day Park Avenue South and 31st Street in Kips Bay. The stream originated at what is now Broadway and 44th Street in the middle of Times Square. A glue factory polluted Sunfish Pond heavily during the 1820s; it was infilled in 1839 after most of its water was used to extinguish a fire at the New York House of Refuge.

=== Boundaries ===
According to the Murray Hill Neighborhood Association (formerly the Murray Hill Committee), the neighborhood encompasses the 10016 zip code—bounded by 27th Street to the south, 40th Street to the north, Fifth Avenue to the west, and the East River to the east. By this definition, Murray Hill overlaps with Rose Hill, which is also known as Curry Hill and Little India. This section of Murray Hill was formerly also known as Little Armenia.

The New York City Landmarks Preservation Commission has described Murray Hill's boundaries as roughly 34th Street on the south, 40th Street on the north, Fifth Avenue on the west, and Third Avenue on the east. The city's Planning Department has described the boundaries as roughly 34th Street on the south, 40th Street on the north, Madison Avenue on the west, and Second Avenue on the east. Manhattan Community Board 6—of which Murray Hill is part—has defined the boundaries as 34th Street to the south, 40th Street to the north, Madison Avenue to the west, and the East River to the east. This definition explicitly excludes Tudor City, just north of 40th Street between First and Second Avenues, which the community board's chairman said in 2021 "is considered its own neighborhood".

For its entry on Murray Hill, the American Institute of Architects' AIA Guide to New York City uses the area bounded by 32nd Street to the south, 40th Street to the north, Madison Avenue to the west, and Third Avenue to the east. In AIA Guide, Murray Hill abuts Midtown to the north and west, Kips Bay to the east, and Rose Hill to the south. Robert A. M. Stern's book New York 1960 defined the area as being bounded precisely by 34th Street to the south, 42nd Street to the north, Fifth Avenue to the west, and Third Avenue to the east.

The New York Times states that commonly used boundaries of Murray Hill are 34th Street to the south, 42nd Street to the north, Madison Avenue to the west, and the East River to the east. Additionally, "the younger, more bar-centric area south of the neighborhood in the upper 20s and lower 30s" is sometimes held to be part of Murray Hill. Times architectural critic Herbert Muschamp, writing in 1997, said the Zagat Survey defined all of the area bounded by East 30th and 40th Streets between the East River and Fifth Avenue as part of Murray Hill. Summarizing the conflicting boundaries, Muschamp said that a then-recent survey of residents found many were unable to distinguish Murray Hill by its name.

== History ==
What is now Midtown Manhattan was first settled by the Munsee Native Americans. With European colonization in the 17th century, the site was called Belmont and was part of the common lands of New York City.

=== 18th century ===
Robert Murray (1721–1786) moved from Philadelphia to New York City in 1753. During that decade, he became a prosperous merchant, purchasing three vessels and obtaining an ownership stake in another. Murray had a townhouse on Pearl Street in Lower Manhattan, which was close to his wharf on the East River at Wall Street, as well as to his retail store.

==== Creation of Murray estate ====
By the late 1750s, Murray was relatively successful and wished to build his own mansion. Before 1762, Murray had leased some land in a sparsely populated portion of Manhattan island for use as for his large house and farm. Murray's house was built on a since-leveled hill at what is today Park Avenue and 36th Street. The hill was named Inclenberg, or "fire beacon hill" in Dutch, referencing the fact that settlers of New Amsterdam used fire beacons to give notice of armed Native American groups. The Murray farm's total area was just under 30 acres (120,000 m^{2}). The farm began a few feet south of modern-day 33rd Street and extended north to the middle of the block between 38th and 39th Streets. (Note: Wuebber & Morin 2007, p. 3.3, gives a northern boundary between 42nd and 43rd Streets.) At the southern end, the plot was narrow, but at the northern end it extended from approximately Lexington Avenue to a spot between Madison and Fifth Avenues.

The great square house, west of the Eastern Post Road, was approached by an avenue of mixed trees leading from the road. (Note: Shown on a detail of the British Headquarters map, c. 1781 in Sanderson 2009, p. 55, fig. a. The orchards are shown behind the house to the north.) It was flanked on three sides by verandas and contained apartments on either side of a large hall. The mansion was at approximately the present location of Park Avenue and 37th Street. Near the house were a barn, kitchen, and stable. The Murray farm was bounded to the north by Thomas Bridgen Atwood's farm, which was on the western side of the Eastern Post Road between modern-day 38th and 41st Streets, and to the east by Jacobus Kip's farm, along the eastern side of the same road from 28th to 39th Street extending to the East River.

The site overlooked the East River and Kips Bay. Like the other grand projects created by distinguished residents upon Manhattan's prominent rises of ground, the Murray house was used for purposes other than farming. (Note: See for some examples Richmond Hill, the Apthorp Farm, the Morris-Jumel Mansion, Gracie Mansion, and Alexander Hamilton's "Grange") According to historians Edwin G. Burrows and Mike Wallace, while some of these farms were for-profit enterprises, "their primary purpose—besides providing refuge from epidemics—was to serve as theaters of refinement". One descendant wrote that Robert Murray "entertained at various times almost every foreigner of distinction who came to the American shores". Early in 1773, and again in 1774, advertisements for the Inclenberg estate were circulated, positioning the house and farm as a summer mansion.

==== American Revolution and late century ====
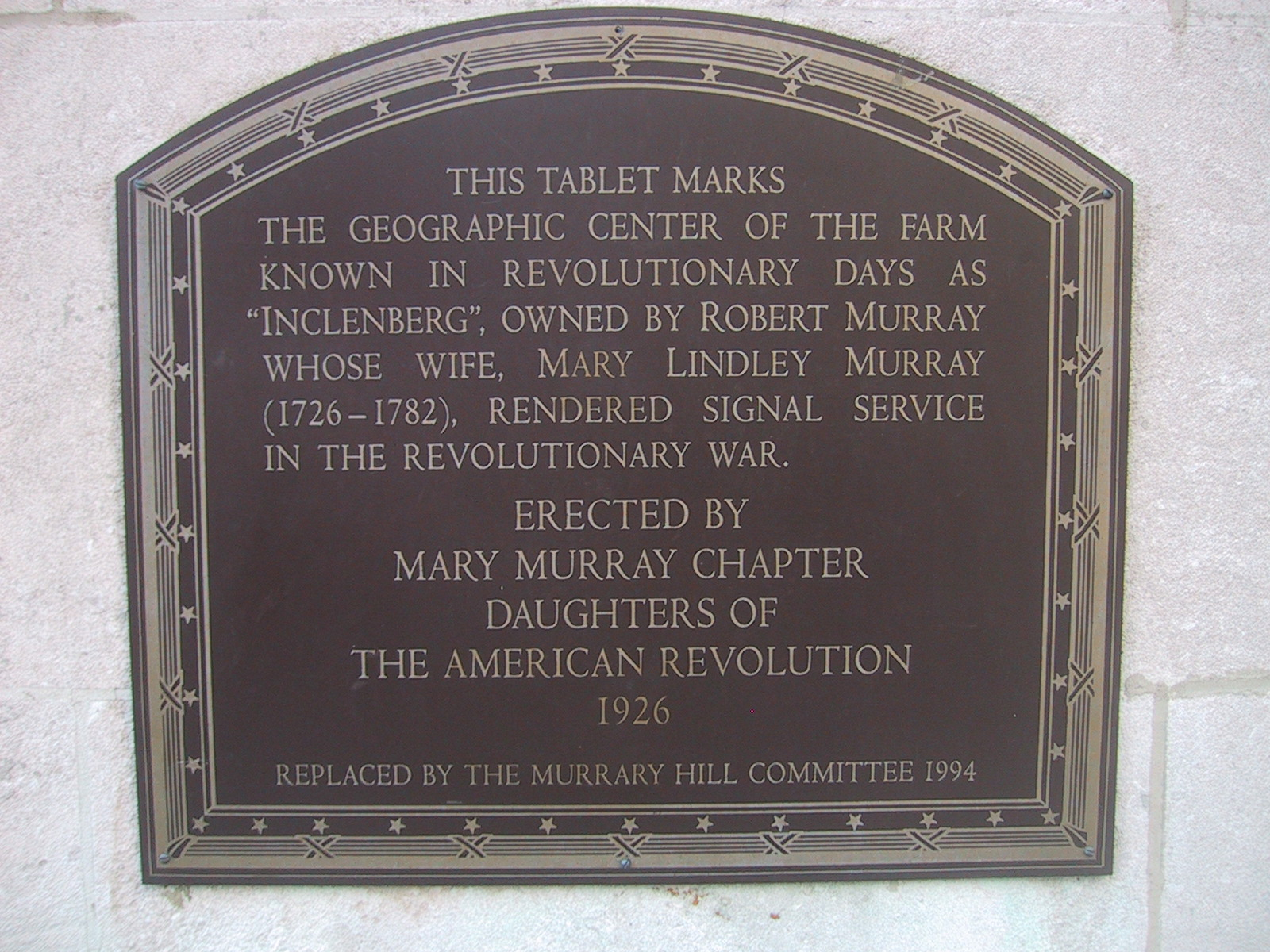
DAR plaque on 35th Street at Park Avenue in Murray Hill

During the American Revolutionary War, Mary Lindley Murray is credited with delaying William Howe and his army during General Washington's retreat from New York following the British landing at Kip's Bay, September 15, 1776. The most common version of the story is that Mrs. Murray invited the officers to tea (Note: Plying them with cakes and wine in earlier tellings, as reported in Burrows & Wallace 1999, p. 241.) and succeeded in delaying the British troops for a period sufficient to allow a successful American retreat. The Rev. T. Dewitt Talmage said she saved American independence by detaining Lord Howe long enough to permit Israel Putnam to pass up the Greenwich road from the city and join the forces of George Washington in the north end of the island, before Howe was able to overtake him. The 3,500 men led by Washington were able to escape safely. James Thacher, a surgeon with the Continental Army, wrote in his journal: "It is a common saying among our officers that Mrs. Murray saved this part of the American army."

According to later scholarship, the Murrays did not have such a large influence on the landing at Kip's Bay as was portrayed in contemporary sources. One contemporary rumor posited that Mrs. Murray and her two daughters had used "feminine wiles" to convince the officers to stop by for tea. However, later scholarship stated that Howe had ordered his troops to stand down until all the British Army troops had landed at Kips Bay. According to these writers, it was unlikely that Mrs. Murray would have known that Putnam was escaping on Manhattan's west side, given that the farm was on the island's east side. Furthermore, Robert Murray traded with both Continental and British Army soldiers. Nevertheless, the Murrays' actions during the war inspired at least two Broadway shows. The Daughters of the American Revolution placed a plaque in 1926 near the site of the Murray mansion, commemorating the family's wartime actions.

From 1776 to 1783, when the British Army occupied New York, British soldiers often visited Inclenberg. After the end of British occupation, the Murray family was associated with unpatriotic acts during the war, and one son, Lindley Murray, moved to England. Robert Murray died in 1786 and bequeathed different portions of his estate to his five children. His daughter Susannah was bequeathed the farm, along with some lots in Gold Street in Lower Manhattan. Her husband Gilbert Colden Willett, once a Loyalist general in the Revolutionary War, jointly ran Willett & Murray with Susannah's uncle John Murray. Willett bought the farm from the New York City government in 1799 for 907 pounds. His business shuttered the next year and, as part of the bankruptcy settlement, John Murray bought the farm from the Willetts.

=== 19th century ===
==== Initial development ====
John Murray and his wife Hannah Lindley had four children. After John Murray's death in 1808, Hannah Lindley and their children moved into Inclenberg. Two of their children, Mary and Hannah, did not marry and instead lived in apartments that were specifically created for them at the estate. In the winter of 1808 during the embargo that closed New York Harbor, a work relief program kept out-of-work dock workers busy reducing the height of Murray Hill. Between twenty and forty feet were sliced off its summit and used for fill. Around that time, the area was subdivided into a regular street grid with the enactment of the Commissioners' Plan of 1811. Under the plan, what is now Third Avenue was opened between 1815 and 1821.

John Murray's children confirmed title to the land in 1816, and Mary and Hannah Murray were given the responsibility of renting out the Murray farm. In 1818, they ran advertisements for the farm, which was only 3.5 miles (5.6 km) from the developed portions of Manhattan. A fire destroyed Inclenberg in 1835 and the lots were split up. The route of the Eastern Post Road from 23rd to 31st Street was closed in April 1844, and the section of the road from 31st to 42nd Street was closed in June 1848.

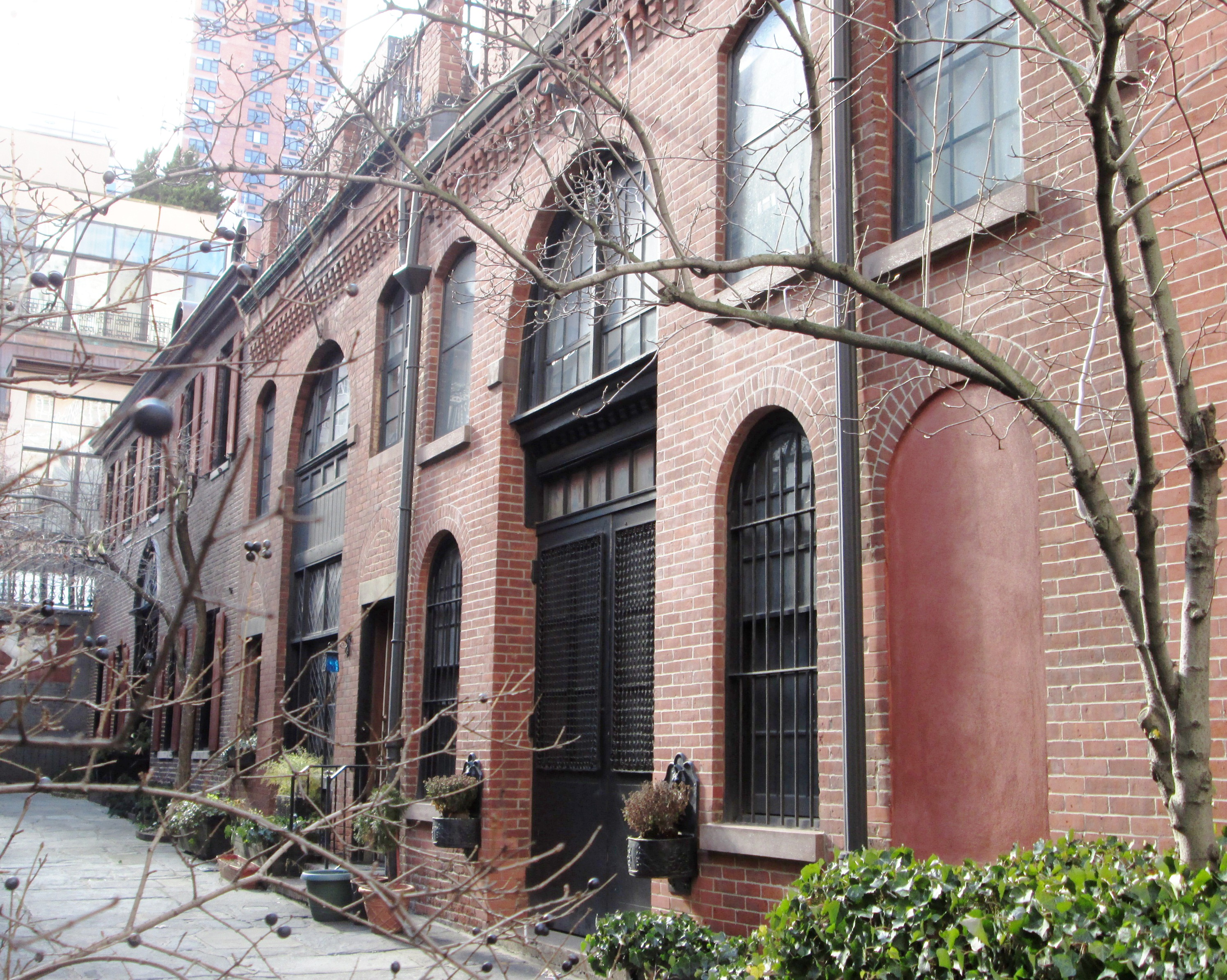
Sniffen Court, built as stables in the 1860s

In 1833 the railroad cut was begun, to carry the New York and Harlem Rail Road through Murray Hill; the route under the most prominent obstacle in its right-of-way was opened on May 1, 1834. The locomotives, which had met the horse-cars that ran through the city's streets at the station at 27th Street, could pass the reduced hill. By an act of 1850 the city permitted to roof over the cut for the passage of steam locomotives. This Park Avenue Tunnel, enlarged and relined, has been devoted to automobile traffic since 1937.

==== Row houses and later development ====
In mid-century, the rich temporarily, and the upper middle class more permanently, filled the brownstone row houses that filled Murray Hill's streets. The Brick Presbyterian Church followed its congregation; after selling its site facing City Hall Park, it rebuilt in 1857 closer to its congregation, on the smoothed brow of Murray Hill, at Fifth Avenue and 37th Street. However, when J. P. Morgan built his conservative brownstone free-standing mansion in 1882 on Madison Avenue at 36th Street (later part of The Morgan Library & Museum), it was considered a fashionable but slightly old-fashioned address, as the rich were filling Fifth Avenue with palaces as far as Central Park. Instead stylish merchandising was changing the neighborhood; Madison Square Park, at this time considered a part of Murray Hill, was bordered by the fashionable ladies' shops of the day on Fifth Avenue.

In 1925, the architectural firm Margon & Glaser designed the Griffon, a residential building at 77 Park Avenue and 39th Street. The Griffon which was converted into a condominium in 1969 and is known for its stunning lobby as well as its oversized apartment layouts with original details and fireplaces. The Griffon is included in the NRHP's Murray Hill historic district.

=== Late 20th century to present ===
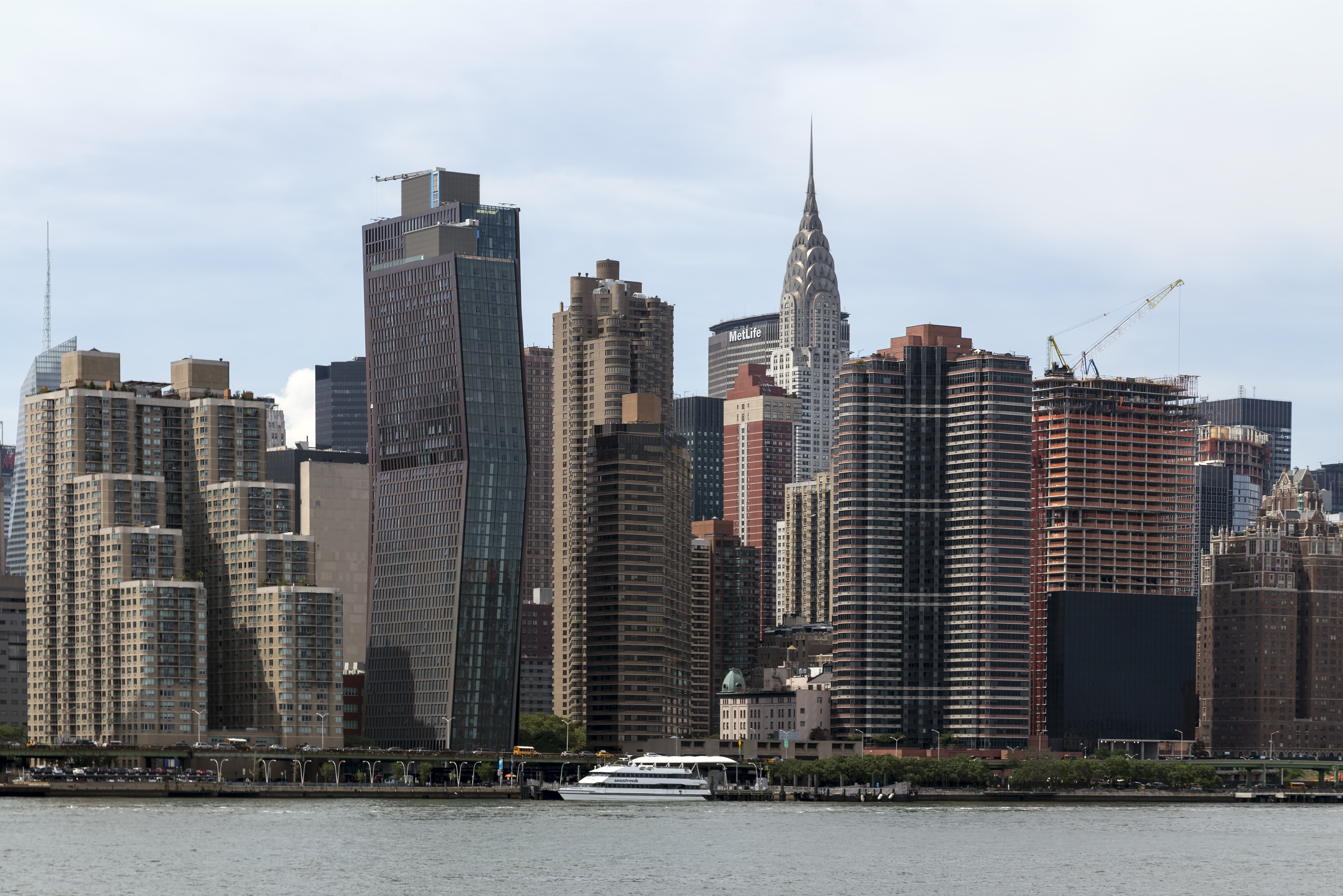
View of Murray Hill and Midtown Manhattan from the East River

For much of the 20th century, Murray Hill was a quiet and rather formal place, with many wealthy older residents. In 1905, Franklin and Eleanor Roosevelt lived close by Franklin's mother Sara Roosevelt in the Murray Hill neighborhood.

Since the late 1990s, many young people in their twenties have moved to the area from the suburbs of New York. As reported in The New York Times in 2011, "...recent college graduates can find themselves among fellow alumni, meet up for familiar drinking rituals and flock to the frozen-yogurt shops and sushi bars that help them stay fit and find a mate for the next stage of life". On weekends, the raucous restaurant-and-bar scene along Third Avenue, beyond the traditional eastern limits of Murray Hill, particularly reflects this change. In the late 1990s, Murray Hill began to attract an influx of young college graduates, leading to a "work-hard, play-hard" atmosphere, which has since been referenced in several media sources such as The New York Times and New York Post. Though housing in the neighborhood is slightly cheaper than in fashionable nearby parts of Manhattan, prices for apartments here rose greatly during the boom of the late 1990s and early 2000s—as much as 500 percent in a decade.

The eastern part of Murray Hill, between FDR Drive and First Avenue from 34th to 41st Streets, formerly contained industrial uses including a Coca-Cola bottling plant, Consolidated Edison's Kips Bay Generating Station, the Kips Bay Brewing Company, and Con Edison's Waterside power plant. In the 1980s some of these blocks were rezoned to allow for residential development, which led to the construction of the Rivergate, Manhattan Place, and Horizon high-rise apartment buildings. Con Edison's lots were placed for sale in 1999. The billionaire developer Sheldon Solow purchased the three plots of land in 2000 and demolished the sites in anticipation of the construction of a multi-building complex. However, these plans stalled with the 2008 financial crisis, and the land lay unused. Solow later sold the 35th–36th Streets plot, and the American Copper Buildings were built on that site, opening in 2017–2018. Solow commissioned architect Richard Meier to design a residential tower on the 39th–40th Streets plot, 685 First Avenue, which began construction in 2016 and was completed in 2018. As of 2018, the 38th–41st Streets plot was still unused, but Solow intended to construct a four-building condo and office complex on that site.

== Demographics ==
For census purposes, the New York City government classifies Murray Hill as part of a larger neighborhood tabulation area called Murray Hill-Kips Bay. Based on data from the 2010 United States census, the population of Murray Hill-Kips Bay was 50,742, a change of 2,323 (4.6%) from the 48,419 counted in 2000. Covering an area of 334.93 acres (135.54 ha), the neighborhood had a population density of 151.5 inhabitants per acre (97,000/sq mi; 37,400/km^{2}). The racial makeup of the neighborhood was 66.6% (33,818) White, 4.8% (2,423) African American, 0.1% (55) Native American, 16.2% (8,233) Asian, 0% (16) Pacific Islander, 0.4% (181) from other races, and 2% (1,008) from two or more races. Hispanic or Latino of any race were 9.9% (5,008) of the population.

The entirety of Community District 6, which comprises Murray Hill and Stuyvesant Town, had 53,120 inhabitants as of NYC Health's 2018 Community Health Profile, with an average life expectancy of 84.8 years. This is higher than the median life expectancy of 81.2 for all New York City neighborhoods. Most inhabitants are adults: a plurality (45%) are between the ages of 25–44, while 22% are between 45 and 64, and 13% are 65 or older. The ratio of youth and college-aged residents was lower, at 7% and 12% respectively.

In 2017, the median household income in Community District 6 was $112,383, though the median income in Murray Hill individually was $117,677. In 2018, an estimated 10% of Murray Hill and Stuyvesant Town residents lived in poverty, compared to 14% in all of Manhattan and 20% in all of New York City. One in twenty-five residents (4%) were unemployed, compared to 7% in Manhattan and 9% in New York City. Rent burden, or the percentage of residents who have difficulty paying their rent, is 42% in Murray Hill and Stuyvesant Town, compared to the boroughwide and citywide rates of 45% and 51% respectively. Based on this calculation, as of 2018, Murray Hill and Stuyvesant Town are considered to be high-income relative to the rest of the city and not gentrifying.

== Structures ==
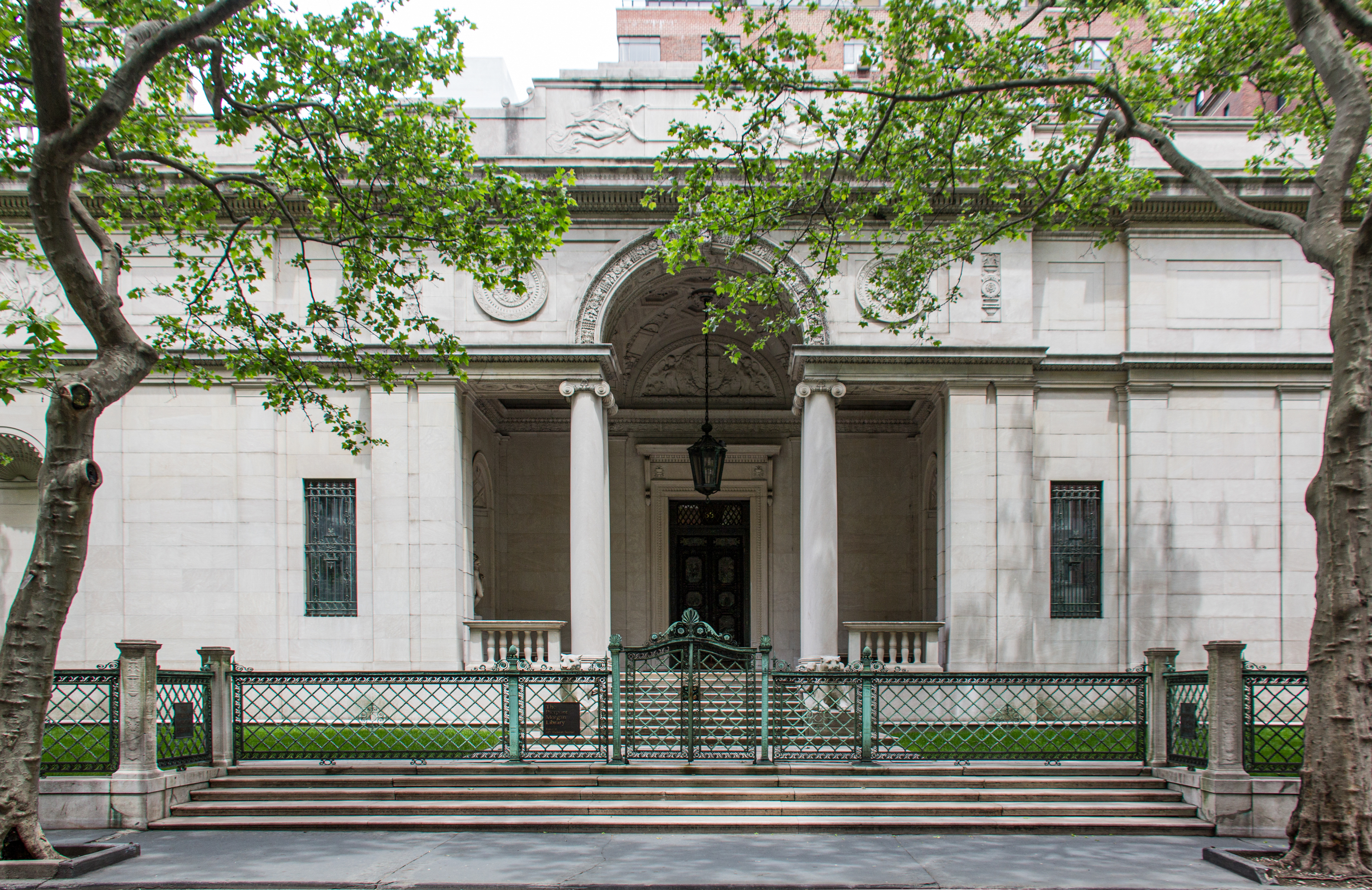
The Morgan Library & Museum

The neighborhood is home to St. Vartan Armenian Cathedral, Stern College for Women of Yeshiva University, the Morgan Library & Museum, Scandinavia House–The Nordic Center in America, The Mexican Cultural Institute of New York, and the Union League Club of New York. Just outside Murray Hill's western border is the Art Deco skyscraper at 10 East 40th Street. The New York City Landmarks Preservation Commission has designated several buildings in Murray Hill as landmarks, including 2 Park Avenue, 275 Madison Avenue, the Daily News Building, the Madison Belmont Building, and the Socony-Mobil Building.

The Whitney Museum of American Art opened a branch gallery at the Philip Morris headquarters opposite Grand Central Terminal in April 1983; it closed in January 2008, after 25 years. For some 60 years until 2017, the neighborhood had been home to National Review, the conservative journal of opinion founded by William F. Buckley, Jr., most of that time at 150 East 35th Street and 215 Lexington Avenue at 33rd Street. 150 East 35th Street was purchased by Yeshiva University.

=== Historic district ===
- Murray Hill Historic District
- U.S. National Register of Historic Places
- U.S. Historic district
- New York State Register of Historic Places
- New York City Landmark
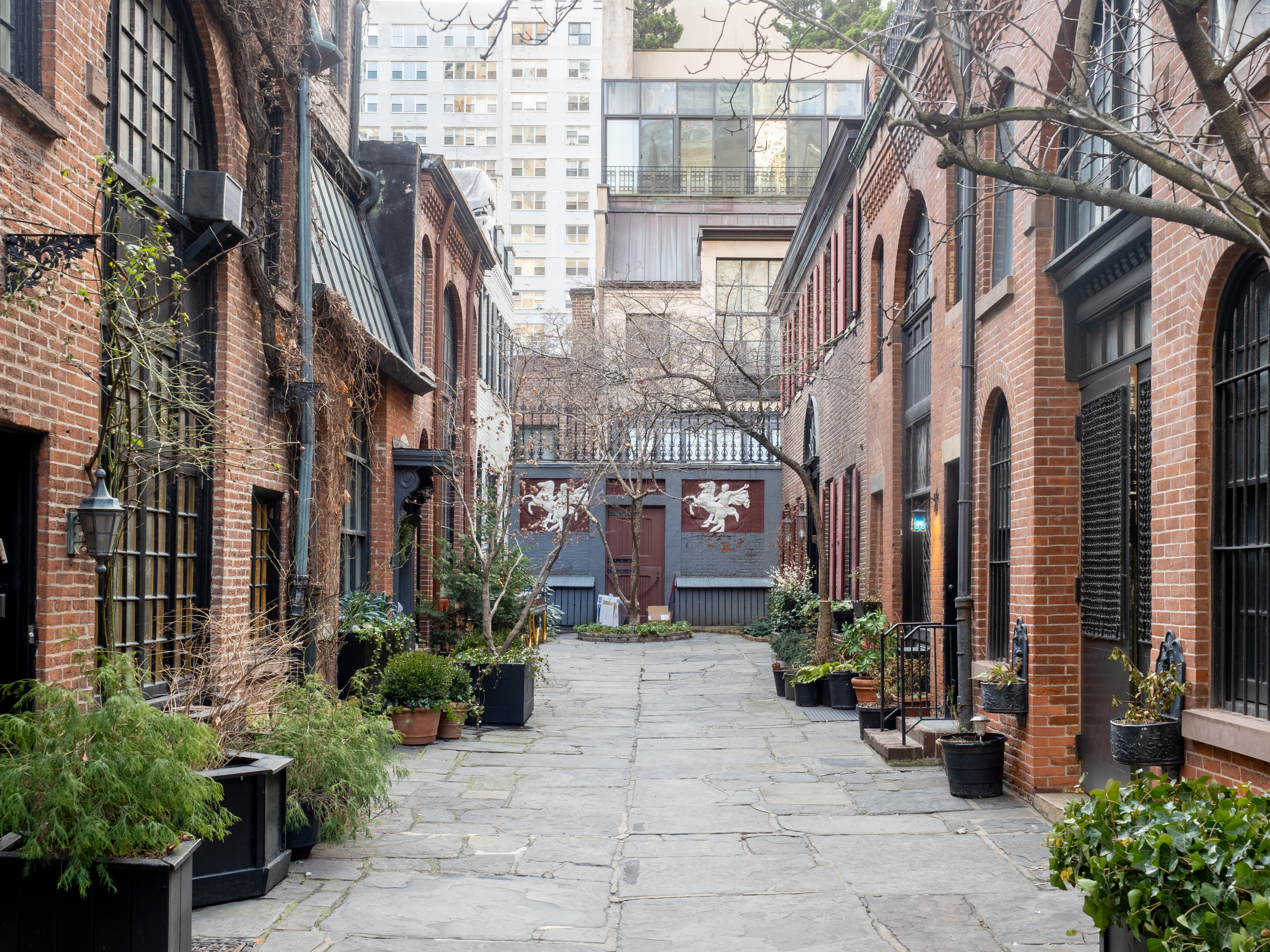
- Sniffen Court, a historic district within the NRHP-designated Murray Hill Historic District

- Location within Manhattan Location within New York City Location within New York
- Location: Roughly bounded by East 35th St., East 39th St., Park Ave. and Lexington Ave., New York, New York
- Area: 8.5 acres (3.4 ha)
- Built: 1853
- Architects: Cronk, Washington A.; et.al.
- Architectural style: Late Victorian, Late 19th And 20th Century Revivals
- MPS: Murray Hill, New York County, New York MPS
- NRHP reference No.: 03000997
- NYCL No.: 2102, 2140

Significant dates
- Added to NRHP: October 5, 2003 (original); February 27, 2013 (extensions)
- Designated NYSRHP: June 20, 2003 (original); January 4, 2013 (extensions)
- Designated NYCL: January 29, 2002 (original); March 30, 2004 (extensions)

In 2002, the New York City Landmarks Preservation Commission created the Murray Hill Historic District. The original district consists of 71 rowhouses, three apartments, a church, and an office within two non-contiguous areas. The district was extended in 2004 to encompass 12 additional buildings in two areas, one of which directly abuts both of the original historic district areas. The expanded city historic district includes properties on both sides of 35th through 38th Streets between Park and Lexington Avenues.

The National Park Service also added the Murray Hill Historic District to the National Register of Historic Places in 2003, with 88 contributing and 12 non-contributing properties. The NRHP district was extended in 2013 with another 150 contributing and 21 non-contributing buildings. The NRHP district's expansion includes several structures built in the 1940s and 1950s, as well as rowhouse with facade modifications. The expanded NRHP district includes about 16 blocks bounded by Madison Avenue, 34th Street, Third Avenue, and 40th Street.

== Economy ==
The defense contractor L3 Technologies has its headquarters in Murray Hill. Sumitomo Corporation operates its New York Office, the headquarters of the corporation's United States operations, in the same building as the headquarters of L-3. Industries supported by the office include Aerospace and Defense, Agricultural Commodities, Agrochemicals, Business Investment, Chemicals, Fertilizer, Information Technology, Latin American Operations, Living Related Products, Media and IT Venture Group, Meat Products, Presidio Venture Partners, Ship, Real Estate, Transportation Systems and Equipment, and Tubular Products. China Airlines operates its New York branch office on Third Avenue.

When United Parcel Service expanded to the East Coast and began operations in New York City in 1930, it moved its corporate headquarters from Los Angeles to the floors above its main hub at 331 East 38th Street in Murray Hill. The headquarters remained at the site until 1964 when the company moved into a new facility in Hell's Kitchen.

In 1959, the United States Olympic Committee purchased 57 Park Avenue—the former Adelaide L. T. Douglas House—to serve as its headquarters, which it called Olympic House. The committee moved its headquarters from New York City to Colorado Springs in 1978.

American Airlines opened its headquarters at 633 Third Avenue in 1975. Three years later, American announced that it would move its headquarters to a site at Dallas/Fort Worth International Airport the following year, in an act that New York City mayor Ed Koch called a "betrayal" of New York City.

For more than 60 years, the offices of William F. Buckley Jr.'s journal of opinion, National Review, were located in the neighborhood, at 150 East 35th Street and then at 215 Lexington Avenue. In 2017 the magazine relocated to West 44th Street.

== Diplomatic missions ==
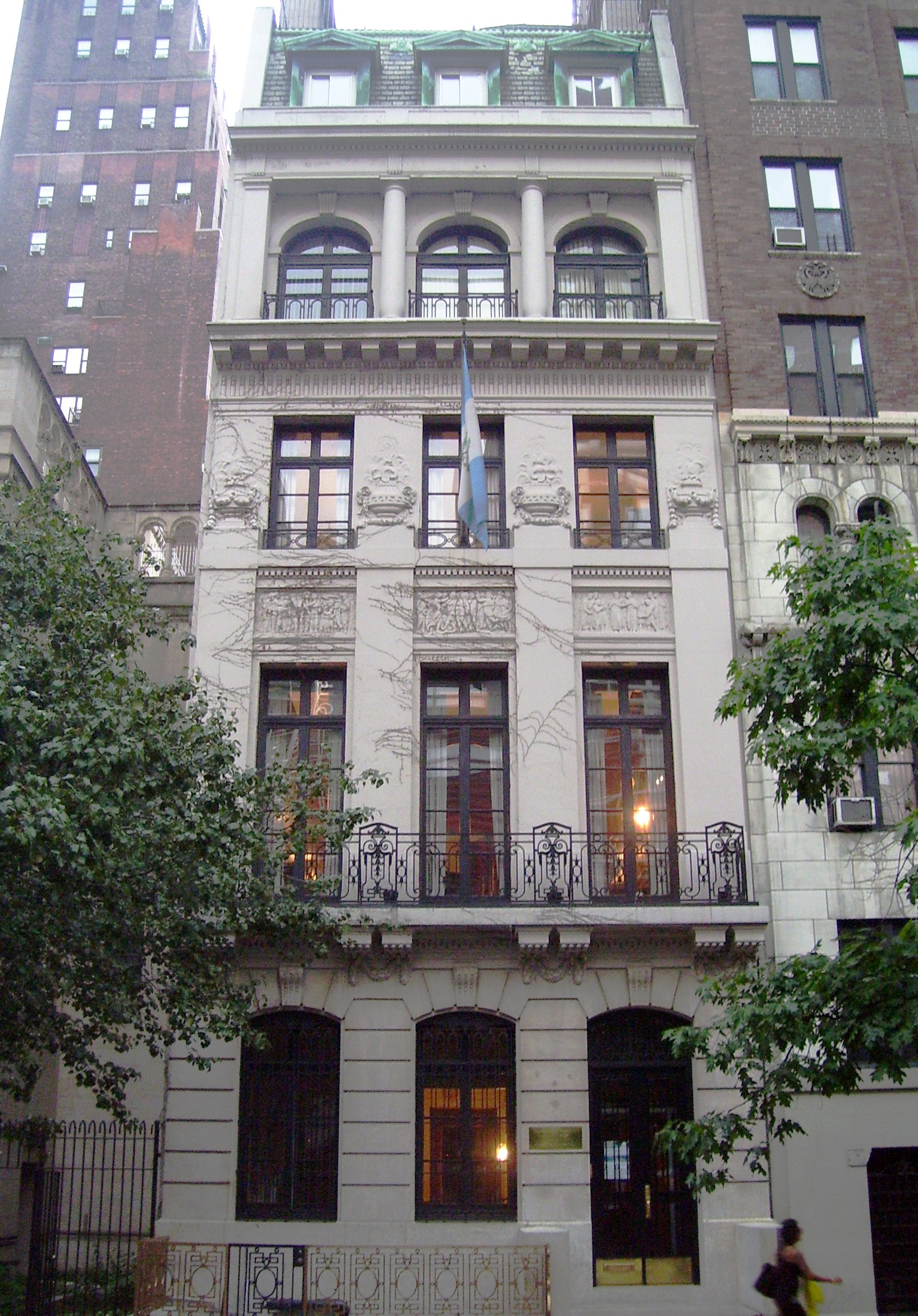
Guatemalan UN mission at 57 Park Avenue

Due to the proximity of the headquarters of the United Nations and the availability of old mansions, many countries operate diplomatic missions and consulates in Murray Hill, including:

- The Consulate-General of Australia in New York at 150 East 42nd Street (10017).
- The Consulate-General of Brazil in New York at 225 East 41st Street (10017).
- The Consulate-General of Finland in New York at 605 Third Avenue (10158).
- The Consulate-General of Mexico in New York, at 27 East 39th Street (10016).
- The Consulate-General of the Republic of Poland in New York, at 233 Madison Avenue (10016).
- The Consulate-General of New Zealand in New York, at 295 Madison Avenue (10017).
- The Consulate-General of Romania in New York, at 200 East 38th Street (10016).
- The Consulate-General of Saint Lucia in New York, at 630 Third Avenue (10017.)
- The Consulate-General of Switzerland in New York, at 600 Third Avenue (10017).
- The Consulate-General of Uruguay in New York, at 633 Third Avenue (10017).
- The Consulate-General of Uzbekistan in New York, at 630 Third Avenue (10017).

Missions to the United Nations in Murray Hill include:

- Afghanistan
- Armenia
- Australia
- Austria
- Azerbaijan
- Benin
- Burkina Faso
- Central African Republic
- Chad
- China
- Republic of the Congo
- Cuba
- East Timor
- El Salvador
- Fiji
- Finland
- Guatemala
- Guinea
- Holy See
- Indonesia
- Iran
- Japan
- Lesotho
- Liechtenstein
- Lithuania
- Malta
- Federated States of Micronesia
- Namibia
- Nauru
- New Zealand
- Romania
- Rwanda
- Saint Kitts and Nevis
- Saint Lucia
- Serbia
- Slovenia
- Switzerland
- Suriname
- Thailand
- Trinidad and Tobago
- Togo
- Uruguay
- Uzbekistan

== Police and crime ==
Murray Hill and Turtle Bay are patrolled by the 17th Precinct of the NYPD, located at 167 East 51st Street. The 17th Precinct and neighboring 13th Precinct ranked 57th safest out of 69 patrol areas for per-capita crime in 2010. The high per-capita crime rate is attributed to the precincts' high number of property crimes. As of 2018, with a non-fatal assault rate of 35 per 100,000 people, Murray Hill and Stuyvesant Town's rate of violent crimes per capita is less than that of the city as a whole. The incarceration rate of 180 per 100,000 people is lower than that of the city as a whole.

The 17th Precinct has a lower crime rate than in the 1990s, with crimes across all categories having decreased by 80.7% between 1990 and 2018. The precinct reported 0 murders, 13 rapes, 63 robberies, 91 felony assaults, 80 burglaries, 748 grand larcenies, and 26 grand larcenies auto in 2018.

== Fire safety ==
Murray Hill is served by the New York City Fire Department (FDNY)'s Engine Company 21 fire station, located at 238 East 40th Street.

== Health ==
As of 2018, preterm births and births to teenage mothers in Murray Hill and Stuyvesant Town are lower than the city average. In Murray Hill and Stuyvesant Town, there were 78 preterm births per 1,000 live births (compared to 87 per 1,000 citywide), and 1.5 births to teenage mothers per 1,000 live births (compared to 19.3 per 1,000 citywide), though the teenage birth rate was based on a small sample size. Murray Hill and Stuyvesant Town have a low population of residents who are uninsured. In 2018, this population of uninsured residents was estimated to be 3%, less than the citywide rate of 12%, though this was based on a small sample size.

The concentration of fine particulate matter, the deadliest type of air pollutant, in Murray Hill and Stuyvesant Town is 0.0102 milligrams per cubic metre (1.02×10^{−8} oz/ft^{3}), more than the city average. Twelve percent of Murray Hill and Stuyvesant Town residents are smokers, which is less than the city average of 14% of residents being smokers. In Murray Hill and Stuyvesant Town, 10% of residents are obese, 5% are diabetic, and 18% have high blood pressure—compared to the citywide averages of 24%, 11%, and 28% respectively. In addition, 7% of children are obese, compared to the citywide average of 20%.

Ninety-one percent of residents eat some fruits and vegetables every day, which is higher than the city's average of 87%. In 2018, 90% of residents described their health as "good", "very good", or "excellent", more than the city's average of 78%. For every supermarket in Murray Hill and Stuyvesant Town, there are 7 bodegas.

The nearest hospitals are the Bellevue Hospital Center and NYU Langone Medical Center, located in Kips Bay. In addition, Beth Israel Medical Center (closed in 2025) was located in Stuyvesant Town.

== Post offices and ZIP Codes ==
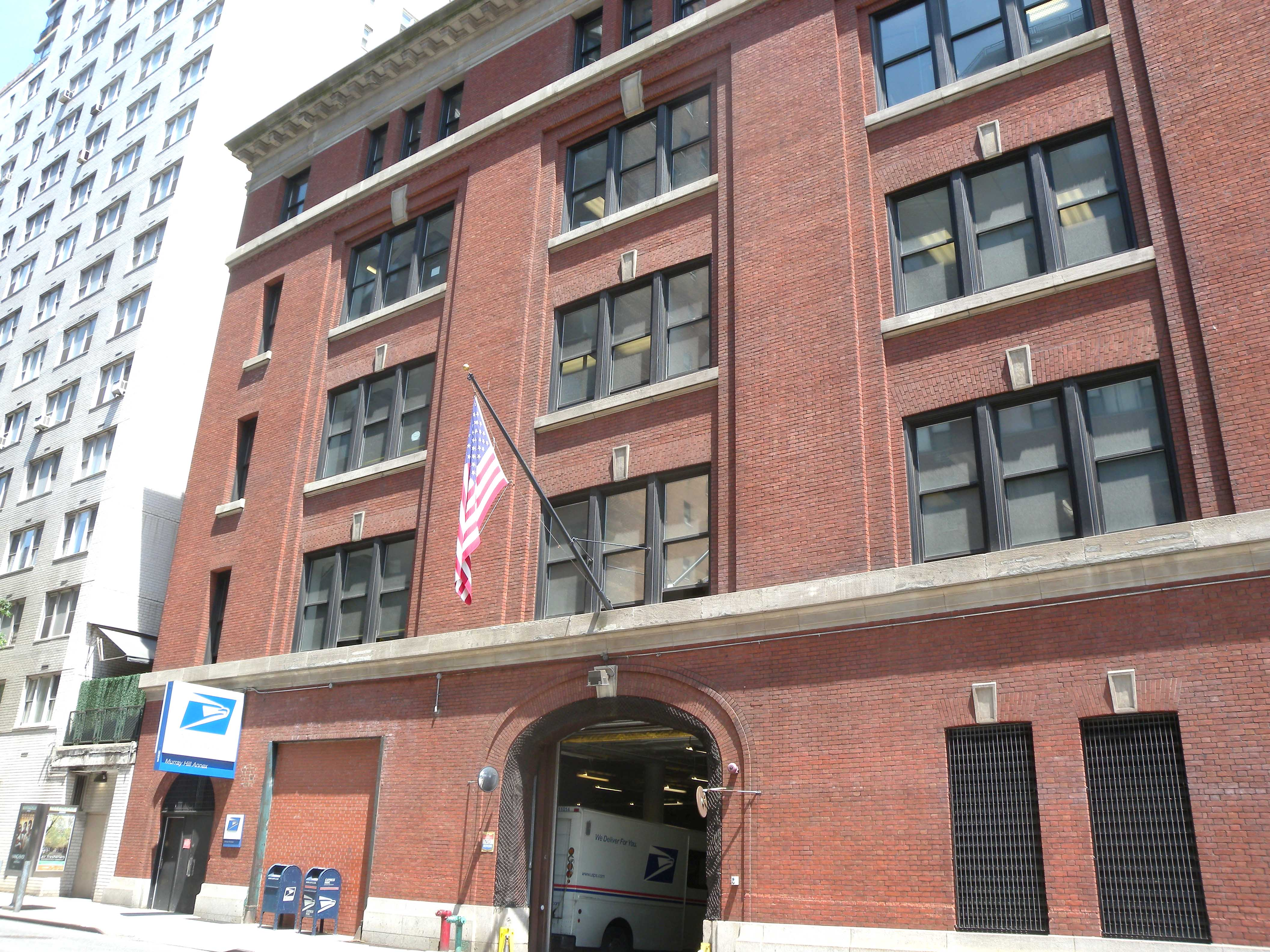
USPS Murray Hill Annex

Murray Hill is located in two primary ZIP Codes. The area south of 40th Street is located in 10016, while the area north of 40th Street is in 10017. There are also three smaller ZIP Codes for individual buildings: 10158 (605 Third Avenue), 10165 (One Grand Central Place), and 10168 (Chanin Building). The United States Postal Service operates three post offices in Murray Hill:

- Murray Hill Station – 115 East 34th Street
- Murray Hill Annex Station – 205 East 36th Street
- Tudor City Self-Service – 5 Tudor City Place

== Education ==
Murray Hill and Stuyvesant Town generally have a higher rate of college-educated residents than the rest of the city as of 2018. College-educated residents comprise 82% of those age 25 and older, while 15% are high school graduates or have some college education, and 3% have less than a high school education. By contrast, 64% of Manhattan residents and 43% of city residents have a college education or higher. The percentage of Murray Hill and Stuyvesant Town students excelling in math rose from 61% in 2000 to 80% in 2011, and reading achievement increased from 66% to 68% during the same time period.

Murray Hill and Stuyvesant Town's rate of elementary school student absenteeism is lower than the rest of New York City. In Murray Hill and Stuyvesant Town, 8% of elementary school students missed twenty or more days per school year, less than the citywide average of 20%. Additionally, 91% of high school students in Murray Hill and Stuyvesant Town graduate on time, more than the citywide average of 75%.

=== Schools ===
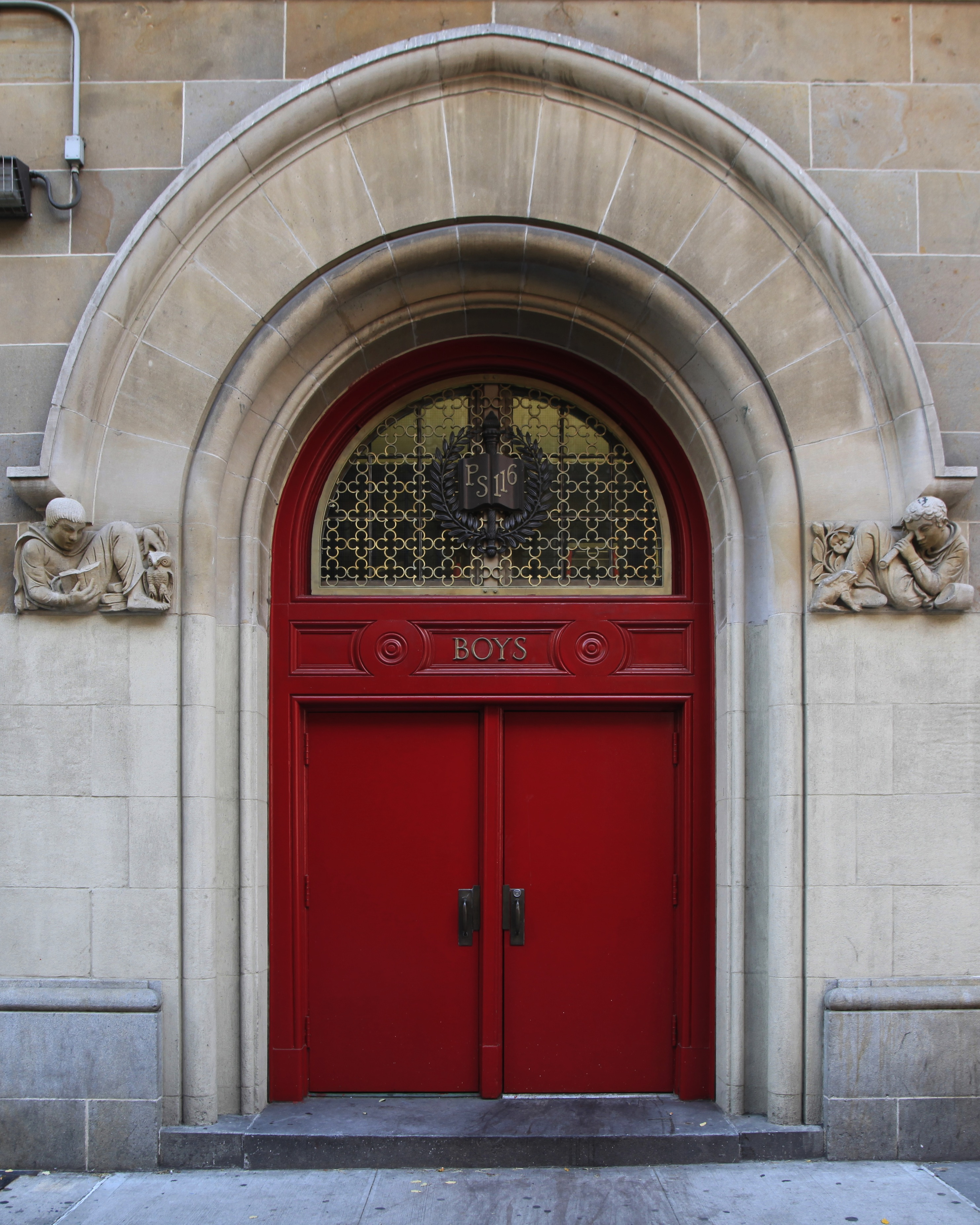
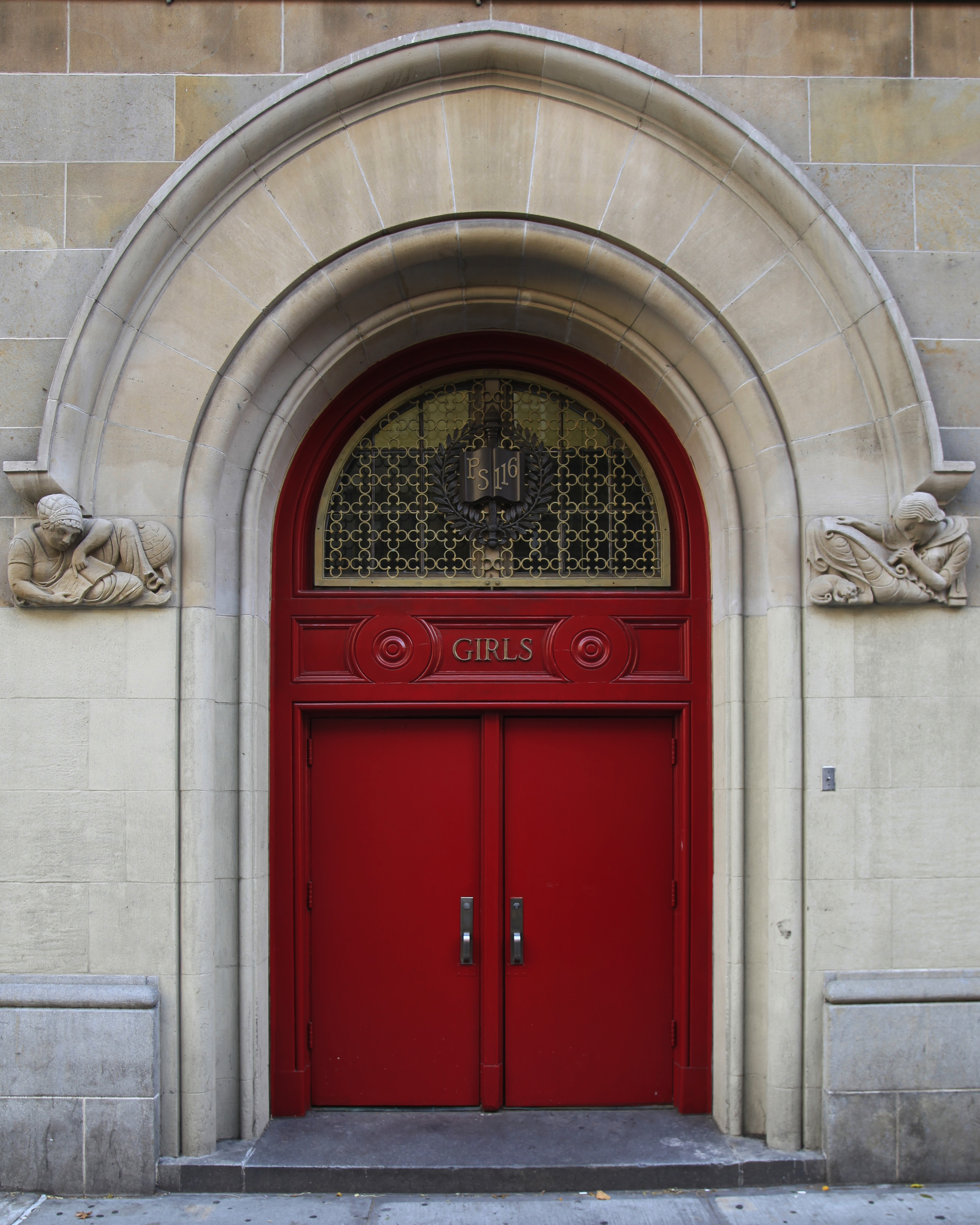
Decorative doors of P.S. 116

The New York City Department of Education operates local public schools. P.S. 116, Mary Lindley Murray School, and P.S. 281, The River School, are the neighborhood elementary schools. The entrances to P.S. 116 on 33rd Street are divided into "Boys'" and "Girls'" doors. Each entrance features decorative carvings of male and female students, respectively, engaged in reading and scientific activities. P.S. 281 opened in 2013 and is located on 35th Street adjacent to the American Copper Buildings.

Murray Hill residents are also zoned to I.S. 104, the Simon Baruch School, located in the Gramercy Park neighborhood.

=== Libraries and higher education ===
The New York Public Library (NYPL)'s Kips Bay branch is located at 446 Third Avenue. The two-story branch opened in 1972 and was designed by architect Giorgio Cavaglieri as a replacement for the St. Gabriel's and Nathan Straus branches, which had been torn down to make way for construction of the Queens–Midtown Tunnel and Kips Bay Towers, respectively.

The neighborhood is also home to the CUNY Graduate Center, which shares the former B. Altman & Company Building with Oxford University Press. Yeshiva University's Beren Campus is located in Murray Hill, which includes buildings for the university's Stern College for Women and Syms School of Business.

== Parks and recreation ==
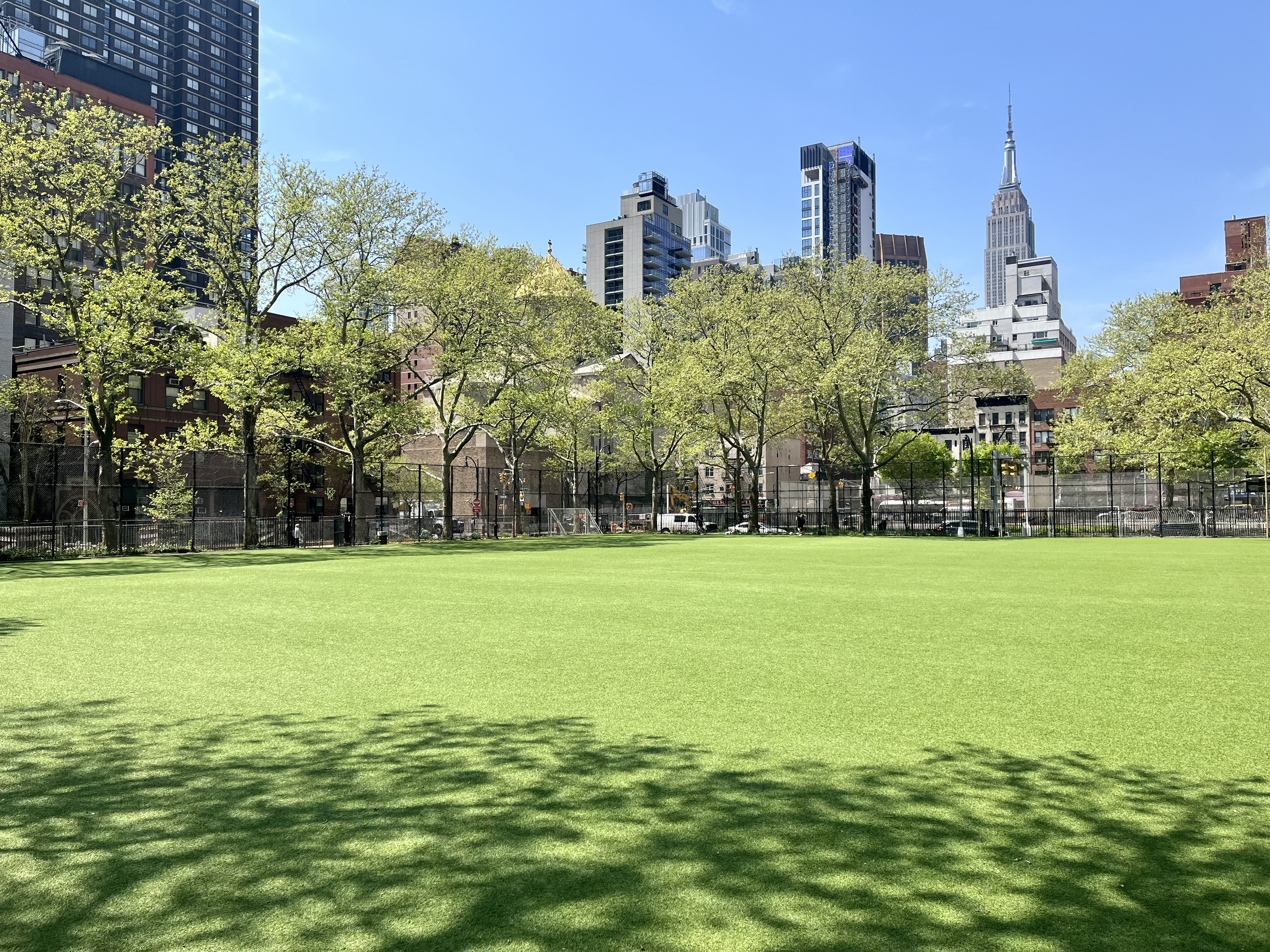
St. Vartan Park

Manhattan Community District 6, which includes Murray Hill, has the lowest ratio of public park space per capita of all community districts in the borough and also ranks second to last among all community districts in New York City with regards to the percentage of district land that is parkland.

St. Vartan Park occupies the block bounded by First and Second avenues and East 35th and 36th streets. The 2.76-acre (1.12 ha) park originally opened in 1906 as St. Gabriel's Park and was renamed St. Vartan Park in 1978.

Robert Moses Playground, located on the east side of First Avenue between East 41st and 42nd streets, was created in 1941 in exchange for taking a part of St. Gabriel's Park for the construction of the Queens–Midtown Tunnel. It lies opposite Trygve Lie Plaza, located on the west side of First Avenue between East 41st and 42nd streets, which was created in 1948 as part of the widening of First Avenue for the development of the United Nations headquarters.

Parks along the East River in Murray Hill include the East River Esplanade Park from 36th to 38th streets and Waterside Pier from 38th to 41st streets; both of which form part of the East River Greenway.

== Transportation ==
Murray Hill is served by the New York City Subway's 6 and <6> trains at 33rd Street. It is also served by MTA Regional Bus Operations' M15, M15 SBS, M34 SBS, M34A SBS, M101, M102 and M103 routes. Metro-North Railroad service is available at nearby Grand Central Terminal and Long Island Rail Road service is also available at Grand Central Madison.

Murray Hill is served by various NYC Ferry and SeaStreak ferry services at the East 34th Street Ferry Landing. The ferry landing is adjacent to the East 34th Street Heliport.

== Telephone exchange ==
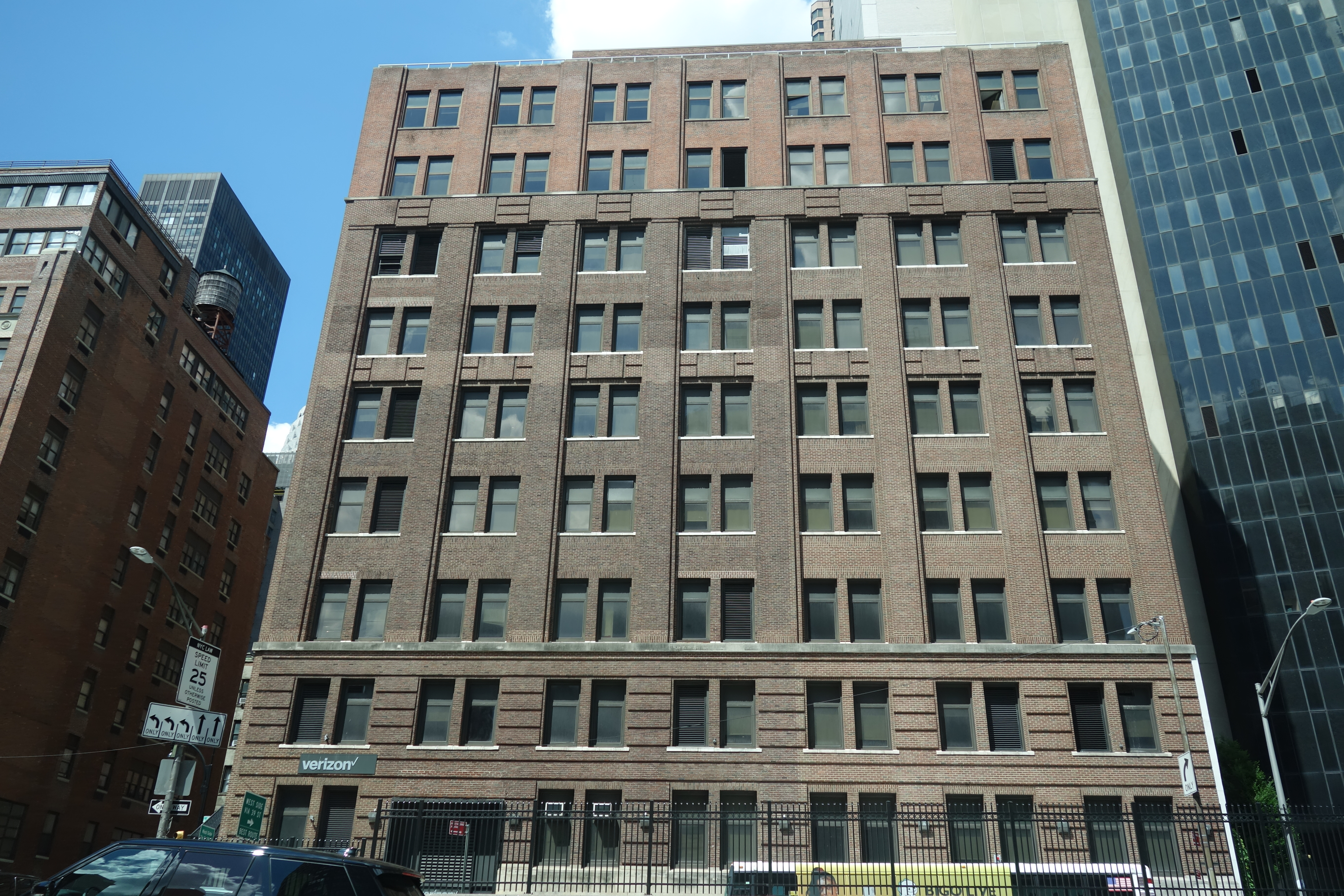
Telephone exchange building at 221 East 37th Street

For the most part of the 20th century the name "Murray Hill" was used by New York Telephone as a telephone exchange for residents living on the East Side of Manhattan, served from the East 37th Street exchange building. Though the entire city was covered by area code 212 until the 1980s, most neighborhoods at the time would be grouped together by a particular exchange name. Other municipalities in the United States would also use MUrray or MUrray Hill as an exchange name. The first two letters in MUrray (capitalized to indicate that they should be dialed) would be followed by five digits to make up a telephone number, such as MUrray Hill 5-9975 (the Ricardos' number on I Love Lucy). This was the way most telephone numbers were given until AT&T switched to all-number calling by the late 1970s to early 1980s. Nevertheless, the name MUrray Hill is still applicable, as many East Side phone numbers in area code 212 still begin with 68, which corresponds to MU on the telephone keypad.

== See also ==
- List of New York City Designated Landmarks in Manhattan from 14th to 59th Streets
- National Register of Historic Places listings in Manhattan from 14th to 59th Streets
