= Adelaide L. T. Douglas House =

Historic building in Manhattan, New York

- U.S. National Register of Historic Places
- U.S. Historic district – Contributing property
- New York State Register of Historic Places
- New York City Landmark
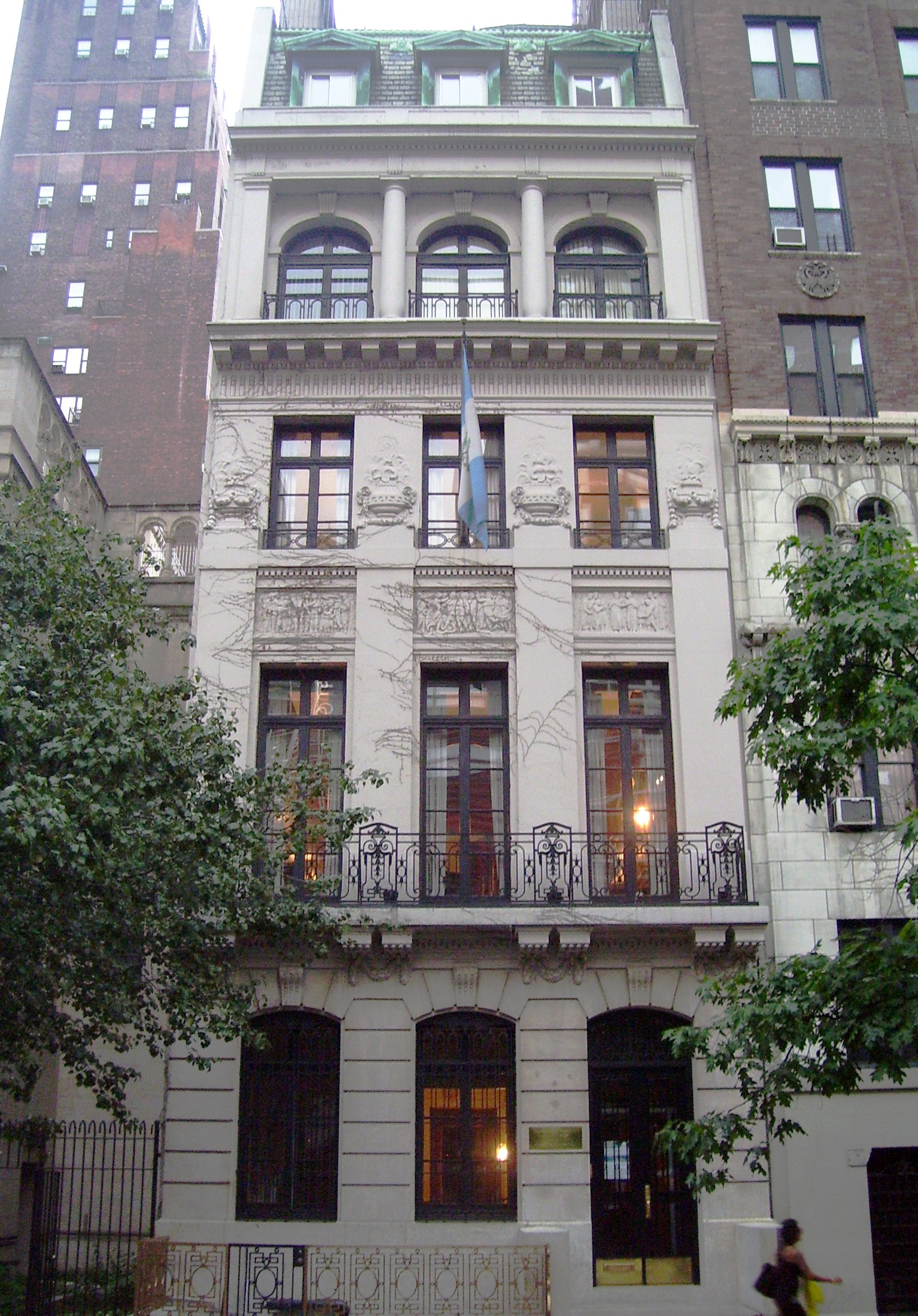
- (2012)

- Location within Manhattan Location within New York City Location within New York Location within the United States
- Location: 57 Park Avenue; Manhattan, New York City
- Coordinates: 40°44′57″N 73°58′46″W
- Built: 1909–11
- Architect: Horace Trumbauer
- Architectural style: Beaux Arts
- Part of: Murray Hill Historic District (ID03000997)
- NRHP reference No.: 82003373
- NYSRHP No.: 06101.001687
- NYCL No.: 1045

Significant dates
- Added to NRHP: July 15, 1982
- Designated CP: November 5, 2003
- Designated NYSRHP: June 11, 1982
- Designated NYCL: September 11, 1979

The Adelaide L. T. Douglas House is a historic building located at 57 Park Avenue between East 37th and 38th streets in the Murray Hill neighborhood of Manhattan in New York City, United States. Designed by architect Horace Trumbauer, the six-story building was constructed from 1909 to 1911 as a residence for Mrs. Adelaide Townsend Douglas. The house was later converted to offices and serves as the permanent mission of Guatemala to the United Nations. It is on the National Register of Historic Places and a New York City designated landmark.

== Site ==
The Adelaide L. T. Douglas House is located at 57 Park Avenue, on the east side of the street, in the Murray Hill neighborhood of Manhattan in New York City, United States. The land lot has an area of 2,000 square feet (190 m^{2}), with a frontage of 25 feet (7.6 m) and a depth of 80 feet (24 m). Nearby buildings include Our Saviour Roman Catholic Church to the north, Scandinavia House – The Nordic Center in America to the west, and the Union League Club to the south.

The site at 57 Park Avenue was previously occupied by a four-story residence owned by John J. Murphy, which was severely damaged on March 21, 1902, during a tunnel cave-in caused during construction of the first New York City Subway line. As part of a settlement to avoid a lengthy court case, Murphy's house, along with some of the other buildings that had been damaged on the east side of the block, were purchased by the Interborough Rapid Transit Company (IRT) in April 1902 and then demolished. After the IRT tore down the houses at 53-57 Park Avenue, the sites remained "unimproved" for several years.

== History ==
=== Early and mid-20th century ===
Prominent New York socialite Mrs. Adelaide L. Douglas bought the site at 57 Park Avenue in 1909, intending to develop a new residence. Mrs. Douglas was married to William P. Douglas, a businessman who had inherited most of the land in the area that became Douglaston, Queens, and was known for being the owner of the yacht Sappho that was successful in defending the second America's Cup challenge in 1871, but she was having an affair with J. P. Morgan and her husband had separated and moved out. Morgan reportedly financed the new residence for Mrs. Douglas, and a plaque in the lobby listed him as the original owner of the building.

Plans for the new building were filed in 1909, and the home was completed by March 1911, when Mrs. Douglas began hosting parties there. In its early years, the house hosted events such as a wedding reception for the Douglases' daughter Edith Sybil Douglas. After Mrs. Douglas died in 1935 at the age of 83, the house was leased to Arthur Charn in 1937. The townhouse was sold by the estate of Mrs. Douglas in 1942. The buyer, a client of lawyer Richard Gordon Babbage, paid $100,000 for the structure and lived there.

=== Late 20th century to present ===
The building was subsequently converted to offices and accommodated a variety of tenants in the early 1950s including the New York offices of the American branch of Associated British Oil Engine Company, the Welfare League for Retarded Children, and advertising agencies headed by Louis deGarmo and Regina Ovesey. The building was sold to George P. Tateosian and Evelyn Tateosian Cotterman in 1955, when the adjacent property at 59 Park Avenue had been selected for the construction of the Church of Our Saviour.

In 1959, the United States Olympic Committee (USOC) purchased 57 Park Avenue to serve as its headquarters, which it called Olympic House. The Los Angeles Times described the house in 1973 as "ideally matched" with the USOC, which had "a real turn-of-the-century mentality". The USOC occupied the house for two decades, announcing in 1977 that it would contemplate relocating its headquarters to Colorado Springs, Colorado. The committee moved to Colorado Springs the next year. The building was designated as a New York City landmark by the New York City Landmarks Preservation Commission in 1979 and was purchased by the Republic of Guatemala the same year at an estimated cost of $1 million. Since then, the building has served as Guatemala's permanent mission to the United Nations. The house was placed on the National Register of Historic Places in 1982.

== Architecture ==
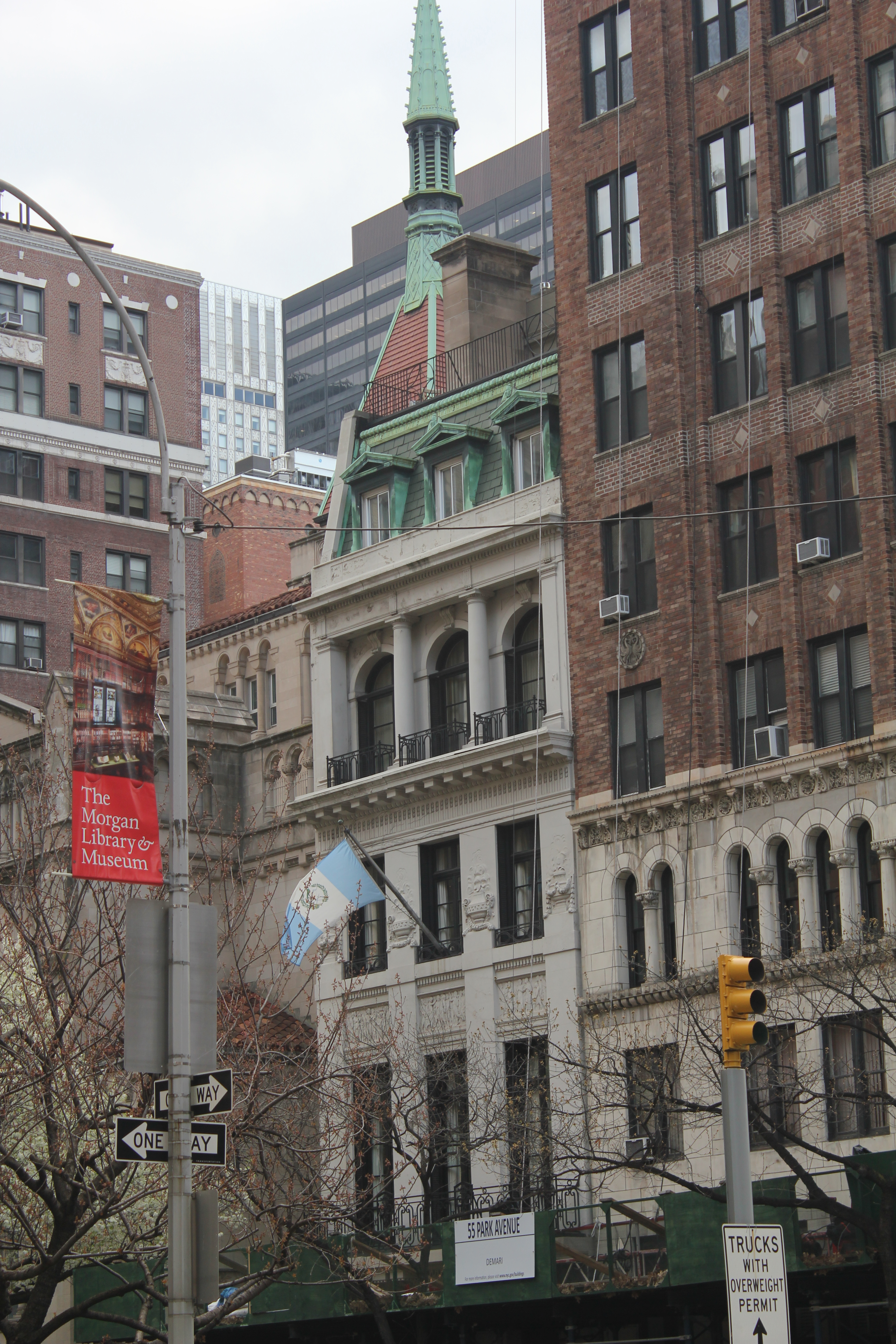
The house as seen from the south

The residence was designed by Philadelphia architect Horace Trumbauer. Similar to other residences designed by Trumbauer, the Adelaide L. T. Douglas House was patterned in the Louis XVI style of eighteenth-century France and has limestone and granite cladding. The building's façade is divided vertically into three bays and recessed behind an areaway at ground level, which in turn is surrounded by a wrought-iron fence. The ground floor's façade is rusticated, with the doorway and windows placed within segmental arches; the doorway is in the southernmost bay. Above each arch are keystones with brackets bearing bellflower motifs. Above the ground story runs a cornice, which doubles as a balcony with wrought-iron railings for the French doors on the second floor. The balcony is carried on modillions with festoon ornaments.

On the second and third stories, the bays are flanked by pilasters. The second-floor French doors are topped by carved stone panels, which depict children playing instruments or singing. The third floor has casement windows with wrought-iron railings, set between decorative carvings of urns at the tops of the pilasters. A cornice with modillions and a frieze with bellflowers is located between the third and fourth floors. On the fourth story are arched windows set back in a colonnade; the windows on this story also have iron railings, and there is a cornice and parapet above the fourth-story windows. The fourth-floor colonnade supports a slate-covered mansard roof on the fifth floor with pedimented dormers and a copper coping. The sixth floor contains a penthouse that is set back from the rest of the building.

When built, the house included an elevator. The interior also featured a spiral staircase and a second-story drawing room with paneling. There were imported fireplaces made of marble in some rooms, as well as two levels of vaults under the ground level. While numerous changes have been made to the interior of the building, such as the redesigning of rooms to accommodate additional space for offices, the exterior of the structure has remained almost entirely intact.

== See also ==
- National Register of Historic Places listings in Manhattan from 14th to 59th Streets
- List of New York City Designated Landmarks in Manhattan from 14th to 59th Streets
