= Manhattan Community Board 6 =

Manhattan Community District 6
- Community District
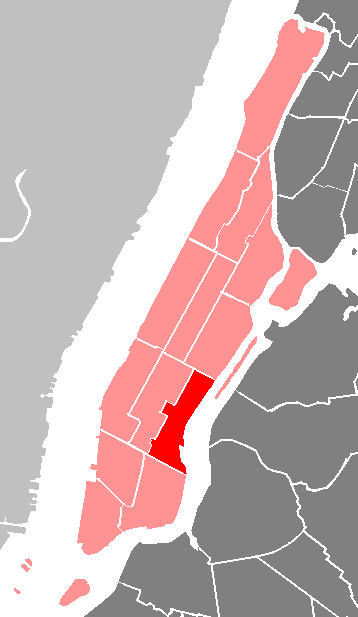
- Country: United States
- State: New York
- City: New York City
- Borough: Manhattan
- Neighborhoods: list: Gramercy Park; Kips Bay; Murray Hill; Peter Cooper Village; Rose Hill; Stuyvesant Park; Stuyvesant Town; Sutton Place; Tudor City; Turtle Bay; Waterside Plaza

Government
  - Chairperson: Sandra McKee
  - District Manager: Jesús Pérez

Area
  - Land: 1.4 sq mi (3.6 km^{2})

Population (2010)
  - Total: 142,745
  - Density: 100,000/sq mi (39,000/km^{2})

Ethnicity
  - Hispanic and Latino Americans: 7.3%
  - African-American: 3.4%
  - White: 69.7%
  - Asian: 16.6%
  - Others: 3.0%
- Time zone: UTC−5 (Eastern)
  - Summer (DST): UTC−4 (EDT)
- ZIP codes: 10003, 10009, 10010, 10016, 10017, and 10022
- Area code: 212, 646, and 332, and 917
- Police Precinct: 13th (website); 14th (Midtown South) (website); 18th (Midtown North) (website)
- Website: cbsix.org,

Manhattan Community Board 6 is a New York City community board, part of the local government apparatus of the city, with responsibility for the East Side of Manhattan from 14th Street to 59th Street. This includes the neighborhoods of Gramercy Park, Stuyvesant Park, Stuyvesant Town, Peter Cooper Village, Rose Hill, Waterside Plaza, Murray Hill, Kips Bay, Turtle Bay, Tudor City, and Sutton Place. The eastern and western borders are the East River and Lexington Avenue, except between 34th Street and 40th Street, where the area extends west to Madison Avenue, and between 20th Street and 22nd Street where it extends west to Park Avenue South.

== Demographics ==
As of 2000, the Community Board has a population of 136,152, up from 133,748 in 1990 and 127,556 in 1980. Of them (as of 2000), 103,884 (76.3%) are White non Hispanic, 5,241 (3.8%) are African-American, 14,458 (10.6%) Asian or Pacific Islander, 123 (0.1%) American Indian or Native Alaskan, 396 (0.3%) of some other race, 2,474 (1.8%) of two or more race, 9,576 (7.0%) of Hispanic origins. Also, 5.7% of the population benefit from public assistance as of 2004, up from 3.2% in 2000.

The land area under the responsibility of the Board is 875.2 acres, or 1.37 square miles (3.54 km²).
