= Sniffen Court Historic District =

Historic district in Manhattan, New York

- U.S. National Register of Historic Places
- U.S. Historic district
- U.S. Historic district – Contributing property
- New York State Register of Historic Places
- New York City Landmark
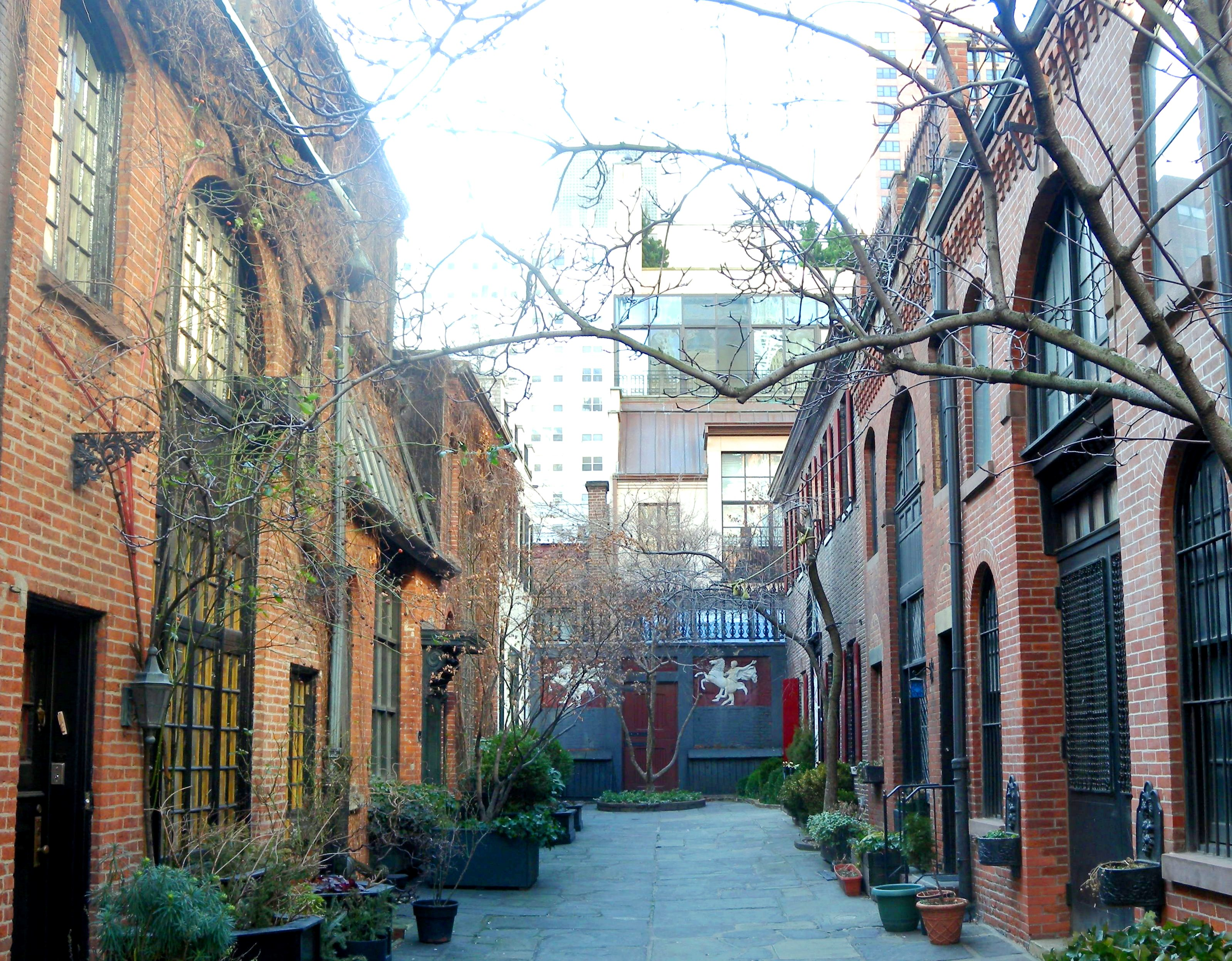
- (2012)

- Location within New York City
- Location: off East 36th Street between Third and Lexington Avenues; Manhattan, New York City
- Coordinates: 40°44′49″N 73°58′41″W
- Built: 1863-1864
- Built by: John Sniffen
- Architectural style: Early Romanesque revival
- Part of: Murray Hill Historic District (ID03000997)
- NRHP reference No.: 73001224
- NYCL No.: 0249

Significant dates
- Added to NRHP: November 28, 1973
- Designated HD: November 28, 1973
- Designated CP: February 27, 2013
- Designated NYSRHP: June 23, 1980
- Designated NYCL: June 21, 1966

The Sniffen Court Historic District is a small close-ended mews, running perpendicularly southwest from East 36th Street, between Third and Lexington Avenues in the Murray Hill neighborhood of Manhattan in New York City. The district, one of the smallest in New York City, encompasses the entire alley, which consists of 10 two-story brick stables built in 1863–1864 in the early Romanesque Revival style. The New York City Landmarks Preservation Commission designated Sniffen Court as a city historic district on June 21, 1966, and the district was added to the National Register of Historic Places on November 28, 1973.

== Description and history ==
Sniffen Court may have been named after John Sniffen, a local builder, although The New York Times could not find evidence of his involvement with the alley. As the need for carriage houses lessened, the buildings were converted for other uses. In 1918, two of the stables (#1, also known as 150 East 36th Street, and #3) were bought by the Amateur Comedy Club, which has been in existence since 1884, to be their clubhouse and theatre; they remain there today. In the 1920s the conversions continued, and by 1966 one of the buildings was in use as an architect's office, the gabled building at #2 (156 East 36th Street) was the home of a noted architect, while the remainder were small private residences.

Two artists associated with the mews were the sculptors Malvina Hoffman and Harriet Whitney Frishmuth, both of whom had studios in the Court. On the rear of the alley are mounted two sculpted plaques of Greek horsemen by Hoffman.

== Notable people ==
Composer Cole Porter once owned a residence at 2 Sniffen Court as well as the townhouse next door at 4 Sniffen Court in order to discreetly put up his boyfriend at the time, all while he was in residence at the Waldorf-Astoria. In the 1930s, author Pearl Buck resided in what had been Hoffman's home. Also, legendary comedian Professor Irwin Corey owned a home on Sniffen Court for many years. Since then, the street has played host to model Claudia Schiffer, musician Lenny Kravitz and, more recently, Irish talk show host Graham Norton.

== In popular culture ==
- Sniffen Court is used for the cover of the Strange Days album by The Doors, released in 1967.

== Gallery ==
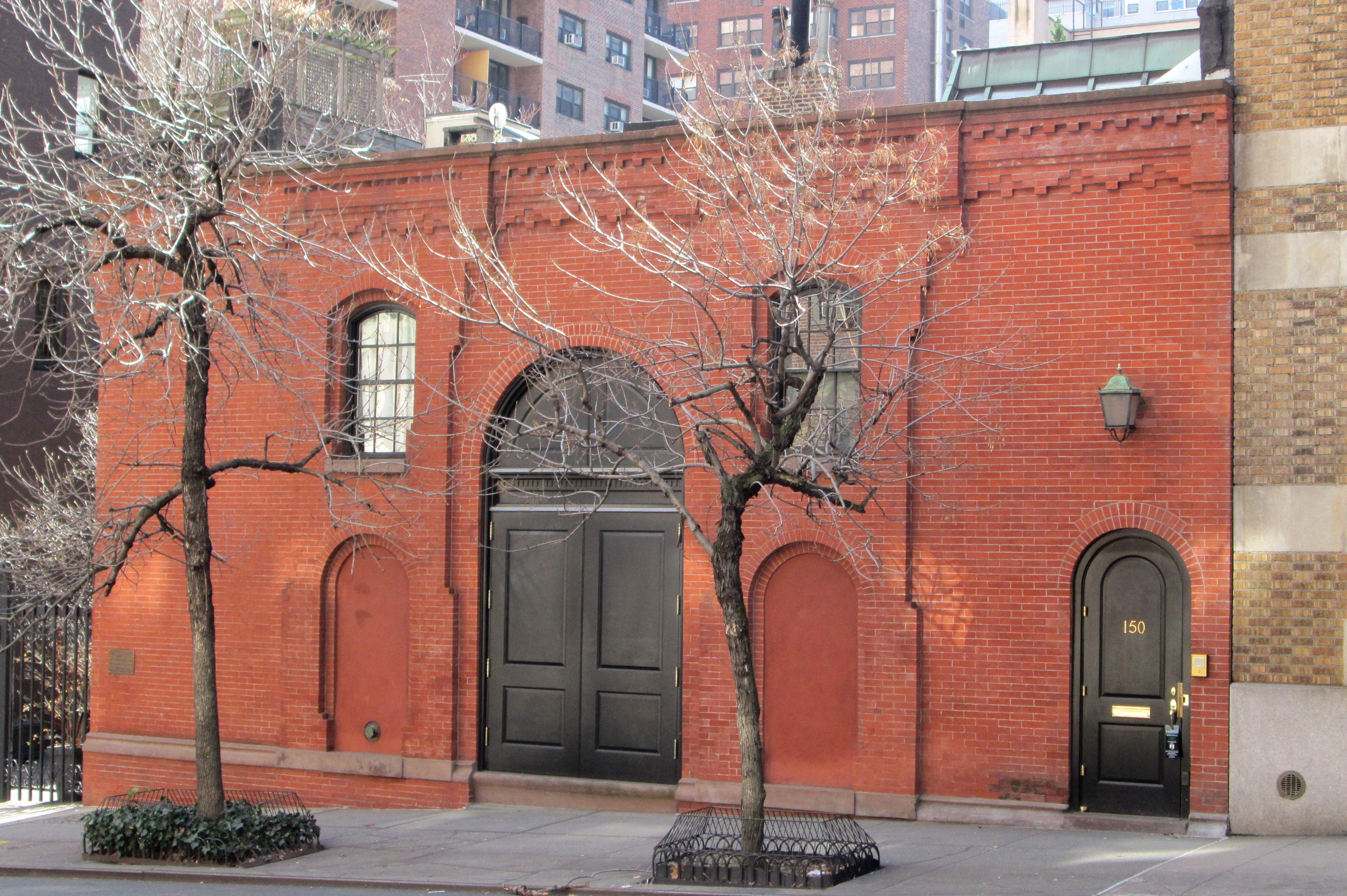
1 Sniffen Court is also 150 East 36th Street

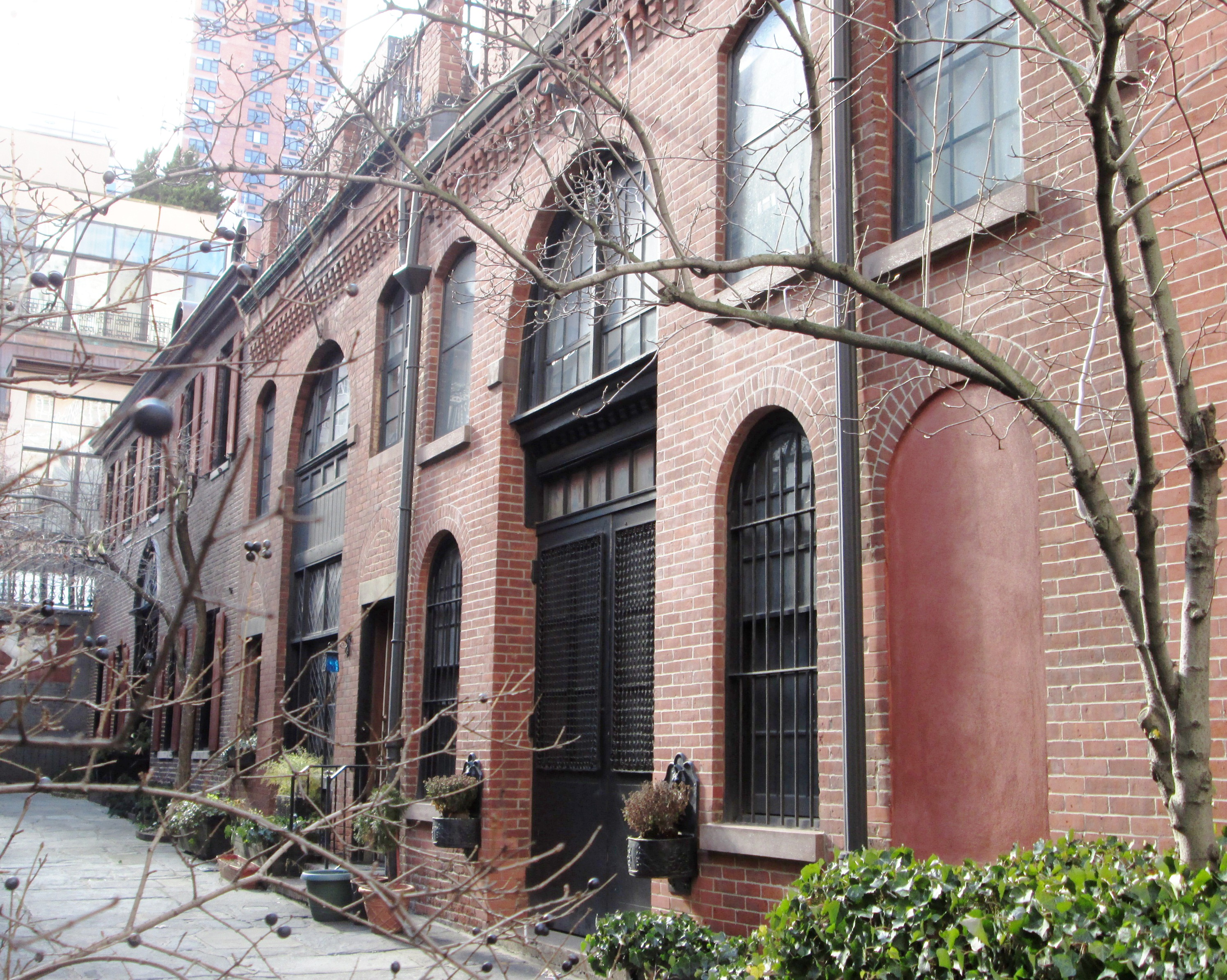
The buildings on the east side of the mews

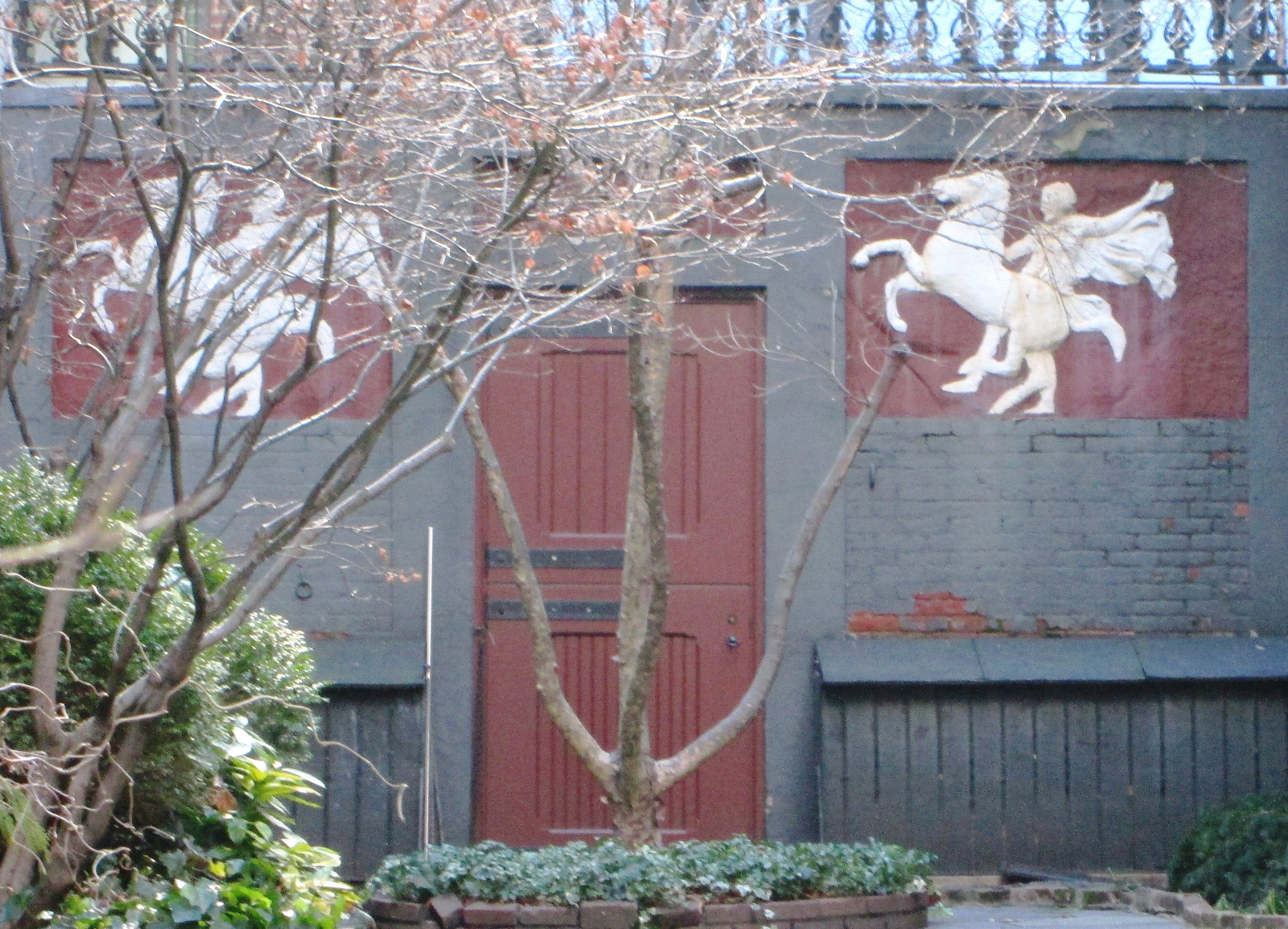
Sculpted plaques by Malvina Hoffman

== See also ==
- List of New York City Designated Landmarks in Manhattan from 14th to 59th Streets
- National Register of Historic Places listings in Manhattan from 14th to 59th Streets
