= Chinatown Art Brigade =

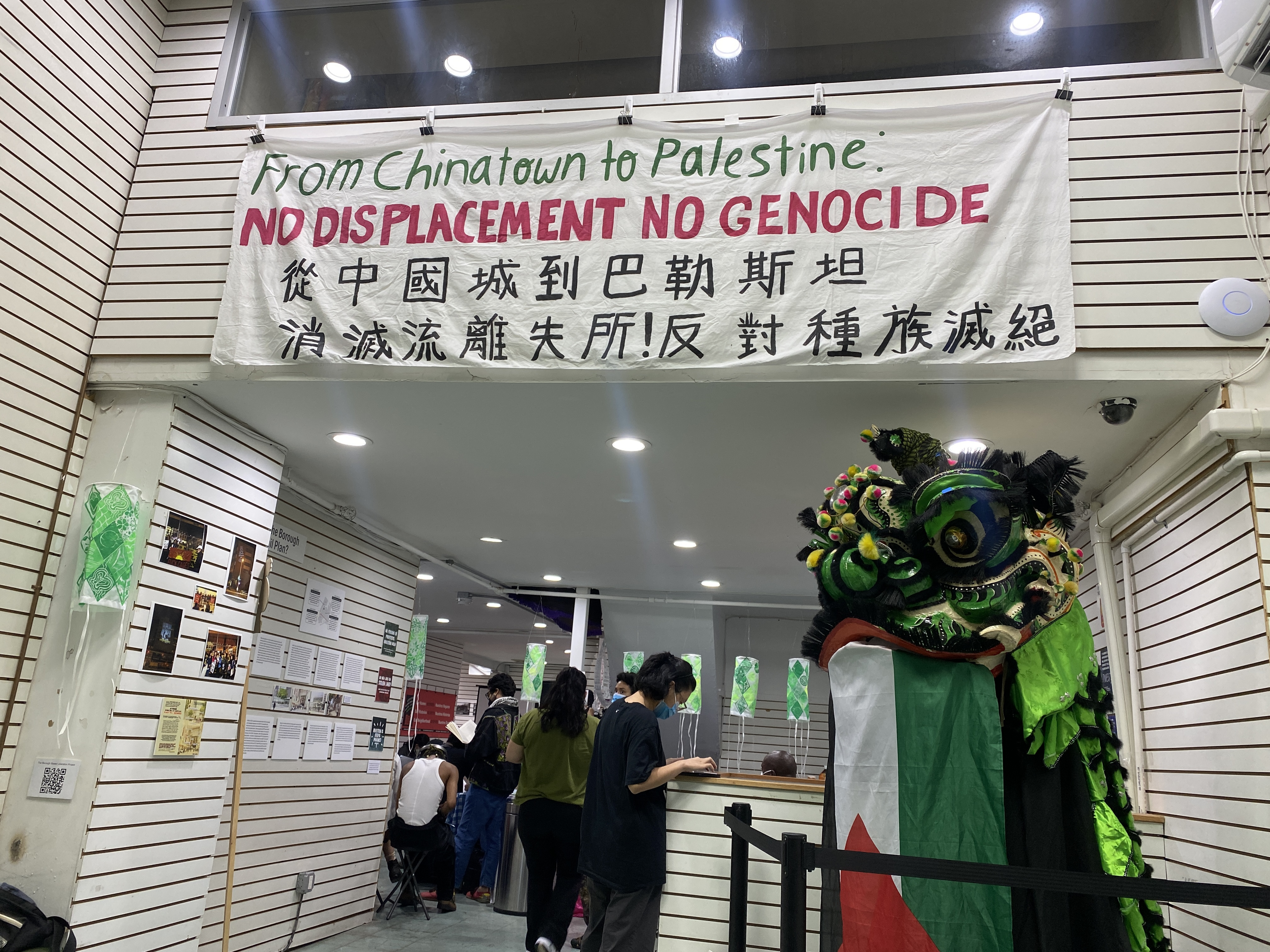
The Borough Based Liberation Project Exhibit, Chinatown, New York, 2024

Chinatown Art Brigade (CAB) is a cultural collective of artists, media makers and activists creating art and media to advance social justice. Their work focuses on the belief that "collaboration with and accountability to those communities that are directly impacted by racial, social and economic inequities must be central to cultural, art, or media making process."

Through art and public projections, CAB aims to share stories of Chinatown tenants to fight displacement and gentrification. Chinatown Art Brigade collaborates with the Chinatown Tenants Union of CAAAV Organizing Asian Communities, a non-profit organization that fights against tenant rights violation, evictions, and displacement of low-income pan-Asian communities.

== History ==
Chinatown Art Brigade was co-founded by Tomie Arai, ManSee Kong, and Betty Yu in New York City in December 2015. Arai, a Japanese American public artist; Kong, a Chinese American filmmaker; and Yu, a Chinese American multimedia artist, shared similar experiences of social injustice towards people of Asian descent. Two of the three founders were raised by low-income Chinese immigrants. Their upbringing directly influenced their art making and motivated the establishment of a brigade to address the issues of racial, social, economic inequities faced by Asian Americans. More specifically, Chinatown Art Brigade seeks to fight against displacement and gentrification of Chinatown in New York City.

As artists, Arai, Kong, and Yu recognized the power of art in advancing social justice. For this reason, CAB is fueled by the belief that social, economic, and political issues that affect people’s daily lives are central to any art making process. The artists believe that art is crucial as a means of communicating inequalities through an effective, universal, visual language that can be applied to and understood by various communities.

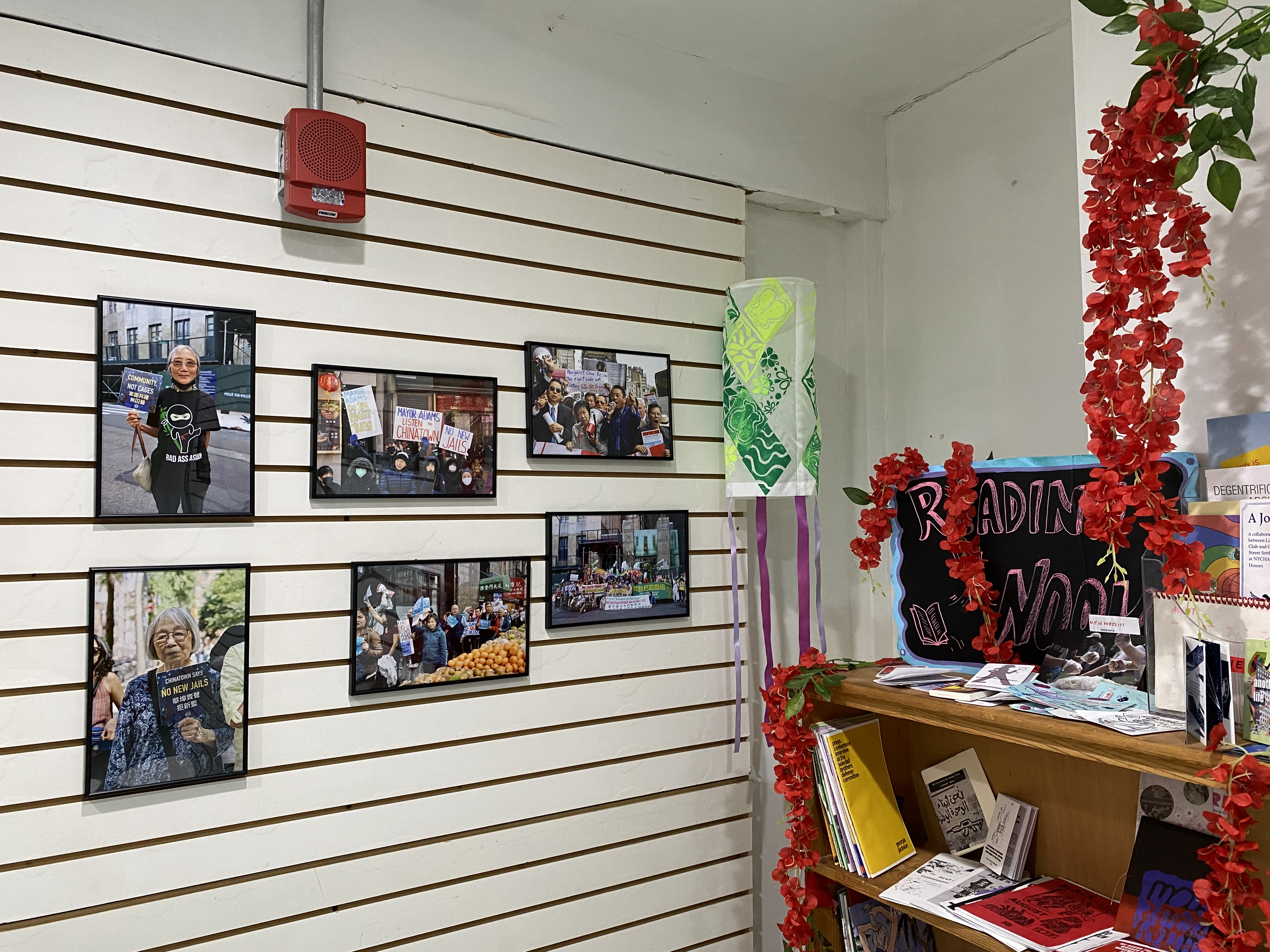
Part of a 2024 exhibit co-organized by Chinatown Art Brigade.

Including the co-founders, sixteen core members of different gender, age, and ethnic background form this cultural collective in collaboration with a large team from CAAAV’s Chinatown Tenant Association as well as volunteer groups.

Within a year the Brigade gained support from programs, including A Blade of Grass Fellowship, Shelley & Donald Rubin Foundation, Asian Women Giving Circle, and Lower Manhattan Cultural Council's Creative Engagement.

== Art/Community Organization ==
=== #ChinatownNot4Sale and Here To Stay (2016) ===
#ChinatownNot4Sale (August 19) and Here To Stay (September 24) are a series of video projections created with the intention of building conversation and organization within the Chinatown community. The works were projected onto several landmark and public buildings on Manhattan’s Lower East Side and Chinatown. The work featured photo and video (primarily text montages in English and Chinese) centered on addressing gentrification, displacement of low-income tenants, and community resilience. In addition to photo and video, “Here To Stay” also featured “The people’s pad” where bystanders were welcomed to write their own messages on paper which were later projected. On October 21, 2016 the organization also held a talk titled #ChinatownNot4Sale to discuss the role of art galleries in gentrification and community involvement in their prevention.

=== Protest Against Omer Fast And James Cohan Gallery ===
In October 2017, the collective received media attention for their protests against artist Omer Fast’s exhibition at the James Cohan Gallery on the Lower East Side. The gallery was re-designed by Fast as an attempt to transform the gallery into its state before gentrification. The gallery featured “a yellow awning with faded English and Chinese characters in red, folding chairs arranged on a scuffed-up floor with mismatched linoleum tiles, red lanterns hanging from the ceiling, and a grocery cart with a black plastic bag tied to it.” This garnered backlash and subsequent protests from Chinatown communities including the Chinatown Art Brigade, Committee Against Anti-Asian Violence, and Decolonize This Place, whom organized two protests in response. The protesters occupied the gallery and surrounding area with bullhorns and signs, many of which were left and taped inside the gallery. In a statement by CAB the gallery has been called “a hostile act towards communities on the front lines fighting tenant harassment, cultural appropriation and erasure. The conception and installation of this show reifies racist narratives of uncleanliness, otherness and blight that have historically been projected onto Chinatown.”

Despite actions by protestors the gallery defended Fast and the gallery remained open until its last day. Subsequently, after the gallery’s statement, Fast himself released a statement apologizing but defending his choices, choosing to leave the protestors signs inside the gallery.
