= Tomie Arai =

American artist and community activist (born 1949)

- Born: 1949 (age 76–77); New York City, U.S.
- Known for: Public art
- Website: tomiearai.com

Tomie Arai (born 1949 in New York City) is a public American artist, printmaker, and community activist living and working in New York City. Her works consist of temporary and permanent multimedia site-specific art pieces that deal with topics of gender, community, and racial identity, and are influenced by her Japanese heritage and the urban experience of living in New York. She is highly involved in community discourse, co-founding the Chinatown Art Brigade. Her work is nationally exhibited and can be found in the collections of the Library of Congress, the Bronx Museum of the Arts, the Japanese American National Museum, the Williams College Museum of Art, the Museum of Modern Art, and the Whitney Museum.

== Biography ==
Tomie Arai was born in New York City in 1949. A third-generation Japanese American, her parents are from Hawaii and California and her grandparents were farmers who settled in the country in the early 1900s. Her experiences growing up Asian American in New York City deeply color her work as an artist, as many of her works deal with the urban experience and attempt to make connections to her family and community through art.

At the time she began to pursue a career in art in the late 1960s and early 1970s, her feeling that the New York art world failed to address her experiences as an Asian American and woman of color propelled her to become involved in community art. She joined the Basement Workshop in 1972 and there, learned about Asian American activism and making art along with other Asian American artists, including Arlan Huang. Between 1972 and 1979, Arai worked at Cityarts Workshop as a resource center coordinator and mural director, painting a series of community murals in New York City's Lower East Side. Cityarts’ first project in Chinatown, A History of Chinese Immigration to the U.S., involved many Basement Workshop members. After Cityarts, Arai worked as a freelance graphic artist for Alan Okada of Citibank. At the time, Arai created posters, brochures and promotional materials for community groups as part of Citibank's Graphic Support program. In the 1980s, Arai began to focus on printmaking.

As a board member of the Lower East Side Printshop and a keyholder for over 15 years, Arai also participated in print residencies at the Women's Studio Workshop, the Printmaking Workshop, Self Help Graphics and the Brandywine Workshop in Philadelphia. These nonprofit workspaces encouraged artists to collaborate and experiment with the printed image. Arai was also a co-founding member of the Asian American arts collective Godzilla, active in New York City during the 1990s.

== Artwork ==
As an artist, Arai has been an avid proponent of making art in spaces outside of the hierarchical gallery system and the need to redefine art and its relation to community. Instead of the historical paradigm of public art as a monumental sculpture placed in a site with no connection to the community, she advocates community-based art created through a process of dialog between artist and community members whose end goal is creating art with which the community feels ownership. She stresses that artists need to build relationships with organizations and communities. She has created community-based works such as “Swirl” a public sculpture in Philadelphia that helps bring to the fore the less visible history of Chinese Americans in the nation's founders’ city, and a variety of other works commissioned by the Arizona Humanities Council, the Cambridge Arts Council, the Bronx Museum of the Arts, the National Endowment for the Arts and the Museum of Chinese in America.

In addition, Arai has created site specific public works of art commissioned by the New York City Department of Cultural Affairs' Percent for Art Program, the General Services Administration of the Federal Government, the NYC MTA Arts for Transit Program and the San Francisco Arts Commission that deal with community themes.

An Asian American activist who participated in the political movements of the 1960s, Arai is still engaged in community work. She sat on the Boards of the Museum of Chinese in the Americas, where she served as its first artist-in-residence, the Lower East Side Printshop, Printed Matter, the Women's Studio Workshop and the Bread and Roses Cultural Project of the 1199 Health and Hospitals Workers Union. She is currently serving on the Board of Directors of the Joan Mitchell Foundation.

She was NYU Asian/Pacific/American Institute's first Artist-in-Residence in 1997-1998 and has also served as an Artist-in-Residence at the P. S. 1 Museum, (1991), the Dieu Donné Papermill (1991–2), the Bronx Museum of the Arts (2003), the Lower East Side Tenement Museum (2005); the Center for Exploratory Photography and Art in Buffalo, New York (2005); the Asian Arts Initiative (2006) and the Center for Book Arts (2009).

Through her body of work utilizing silk-screening, site-specific installations, collections of oral histories and community memories and images, Arai explores the relationship of art to history and the role that memory plays in retelling a collective past or the mythology of the past. Her work demonstrates her persistent commitment to documenting and reclaiming a variety of peoples’ untold histories while it simultaneously also engages viewers in dialogue with contemporary social struggles.

=== Public projects ===
Renewal by Arai was commissioned in 1995 and was installed in the Ted Weiss Federal Building in 1998. Made of overlapping silkscreen images on canvas, this work was created to honor the ancestors of the African American descendant community of New York by commemorating the African Burial Ground site.

In 2001, Arai's Song for a Child, a mural fabricated using glass and marble based on the children's lullaby written by Chris Iijima, was installed in the lobby of the New York City Administration for Children's Services' new Children's Center, which houses an intake center for young children entering foster care.

Later, in 2006, Arai constructed the site-specific work Swirl out of wood, steel, and silk screened photographs of local members of the community. Located in Philadelphia, this artwork was made in response to the then-Mayor John F. Street's plans to build a baseball stadium for the Philadelphia Phillies, that would result in the demolition of various establishments within Chinatown. The artwork itself is a large display of family photographs, shaped like the Chinese jade bi, situated in the Vine Street Expressway.

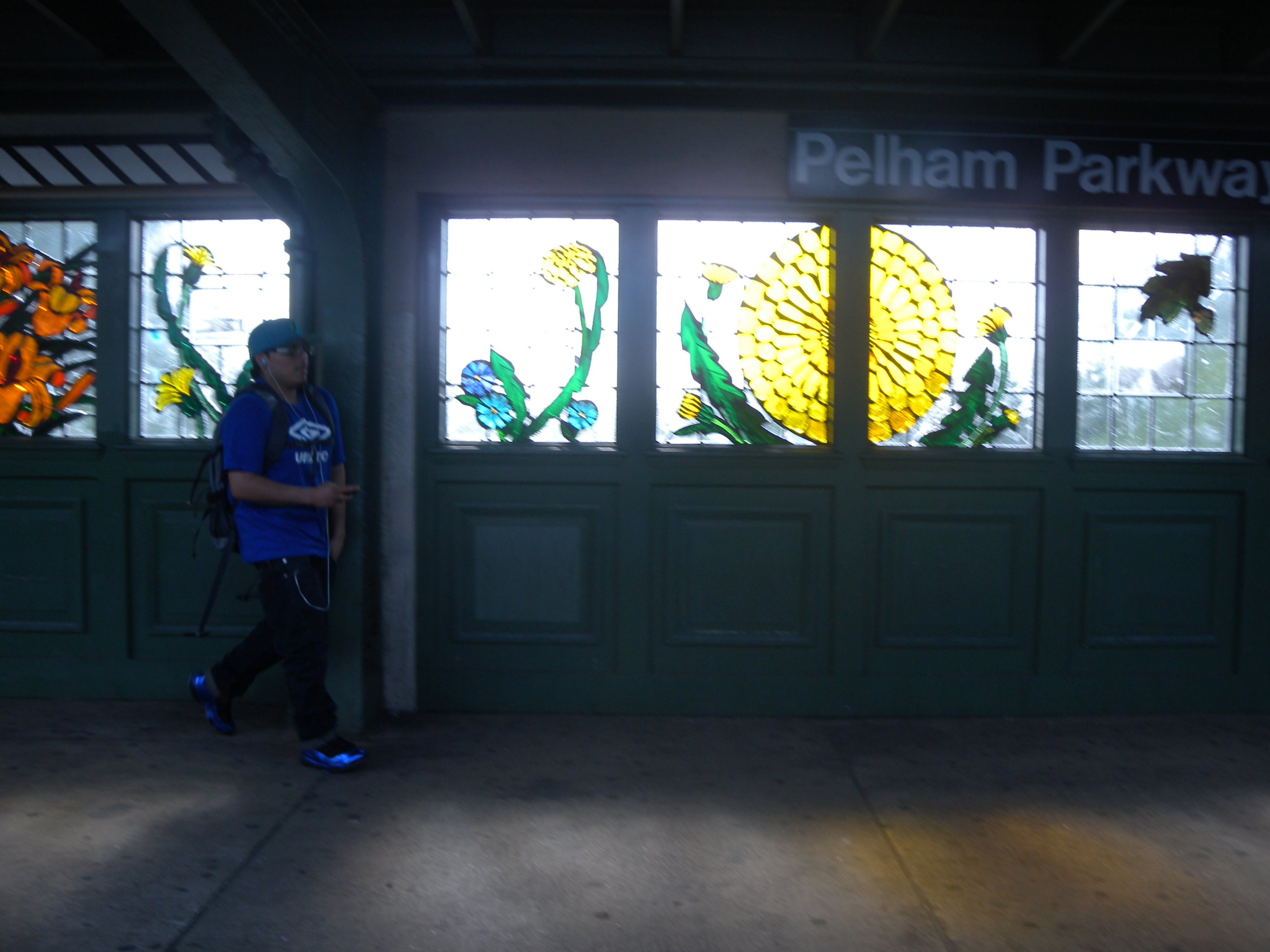
Back to the Garden photographed in 2011.

Arai created Back to the Garden in 2007, located at Pelham Parkway station. The artwork consists of windows with glass recreations of local seasonal foliage inside. Screened and fired into these windows and foliage recreations are archival photographs of the surrounding area, taken from 1899 to 1969.

=== Permanent collections ===
Arai's work is in the permanent collections in museums including the Museum of Modern Art, Library of Congress, Museum of Chinese in the Americas, and the National Gallery of Art in Washington, DC.

=== Awards ===
- Women, Arts and Activism grant from Asian Women Giving Circle (2013).
- Puffin Foundation Award (2013).
- Professional Development Fellow of the Creative Change Program's Laundromat Project (2012).
- Asian American Arts Alliance Honoree (2010).
- Women, Arts and Activism grant from Asian Women Giving Circle (2007).
- Urban Artist Initiative Grant from Asian American Arts Alliance (2007).
- Mid Atlantic Arts Foundation Artists & Communities Residency (2005).
- Mid Atlantic Arts Foundation Artists & Communities Residency (2003).
- Anonymous Was A Woman Award (1997)

== Literature ==
In 1997 Arai was included in Just Like Me: Self Portraits and Stories which was edited by Harriet Rohmer and published by Children's Book Press. Later, in 1998 the Bronx Museum of the Arts published Arai's book: Tomie Arai: Double happiness. Arai also illustrated children's book, Sachiko Means Happiness (1990).

== Chinatown Art Brigade ==
Chinatown Art Brigade was co-founded by Arai, ManSee Kong, and Betty Yu in New York City in December 2015. CAB is a cultural collective of artists, media makers and activists creating art and media to advance social justice. It is collaborating with the Chinatown Tenants Union of CAAAV Organizing Asian Communities (www.caaav.org), a grassroots non-profit that organizes low-income pan-Asian communities around tenant rights, fighting evictions and displacement.
