= National Register of Historic Places listings in Manhattan from 14th to 59th Streets =

The following properties and districts on Manhattan Island from 14th to 59th Streets, a significant portion of the New York City borough of Manhattan, are listed on the National Register of Historic Places. For properties and districts in other parts of Manhattan, whether on Manhattan Island, other islands within the borough, or the neighborhood of Marble Hill on the North American mainland, see National Register of Historic Places listings in Manhattan. The locations of National Register properties and districts (at least for all showing latitude and longitude coordinates below) may be seen in an online map by clicking on "Map of all coordinates".

This National Park Service list is complete through NPS recent listings posted November 6, 2026.

Contents: Counties in New York
Albany (Albany) – Allegany – Bronx – Broome – Cattaraugus – Cayuga – Chautauqua – Chemung – Chenango – Clinton – Columbia – Cortland – Delaware – Dutchess (Poughkeepsie, Rhinebeck) – Erie (Buffalo) – Essex – Franklin – Fulton – Genesee – Greene – Hamilton – Herkimer – Jefferson – Kings – Lewis – Livingston – Madison – Monroe (Rochester) – Montgomery – Nassau – New York (Below 14th Street, 14th to 59th Streets, 59th to 110th Streets, Above 110th Street, Islands) – Niagara (Niagara Falls) – Oneida – Onondaga (Syracuse) – Ontario – Orange – Orleans – Oswego – Otsego – Putnam – Queens – Rensselaer – Richmond – Rockland – St. Lawrence – Saratoga – Schenectady – Schoharie – Schuyler – Seneca – Steuben – Suffolk – Sullivan – Tioga – Tompkins – Ulster – Warren – Washington – Wayne – Westchester (Northern, Southern, New Rochelle, Peekskill, Yonkers) – Wyoming – Yates

== Current listings from 14th to 59th Streets ==
	Name on the Register	Image	Date listed	Location	Neighborhood	Description
1	14th Street-Union Square Subway Station (IRT; Dual System BMT)	14th Street-Union Square Subway Station (IRT; Dual System BMT)	July 6, 2005 (#05000671)	Broadway, 4th Ave., and E. 14th St. 40°44′07″N 73°59′28″W	Union Square	Subway station (4, 5, 6, <6>, L, N, Q, R, and W trains)
2	240 Central Park South	240 Central Park South	May 12, 2009 (#09000304)	240 Central Park South; 40°46′04″N 73°58′52″W	Columbus Circle	
3	28th Street Subway Station (IRT)	28th Street Subway Station (IRT)	March 30, 2005 (#05000230)	Under Park Avenue S, bet E 29th and 27th Sts. 40°44′36″N 73°59′04″W	Rose Hill	Subway station (4, 6, and <6> trains)
4	33rd Street Subway Station (IRT)	33rd Street Subway Station (IRT)	September 17, 2004 (#04001014)	33rd St. and Park Ave. 40°44′53″N 73°58′55″W	Murray Hill	Subway station (4, 6, and <6> trains)
5	59th Street-Columbus Circle Subway Station (IRT)	59th Street-Columbus Circle Subway Station (IRT)	September 17, 2004 (#04001015)	Junction of Broadway and Central Park South; 40°46′05″N 73°58′57″W	Columbus Circle	Subway station (1 and 2 trains)
6	69th Regiment Armory	69th Regiment Armory	January 28, 1994 (#93001538)	68 Lexington Ave. 40°44′28″N 73°59′05″W	Rose Hill	
7	Actors Temple	Actors Temple	May 19, 2005 (#05000445)	339 W. 47th St. 40°45′40″N 73°59′22″W	Hell's Kitchen	
8	Alwyn Court Apartments	Alwyn Court Apartments	December 26, 1979 (#79001599)	180 W. 58th St. 40°45′57″N 73°58′48″W	Midtown Manhattan	
9	American Fine Arts Society	American Fine Arts Society	May 6, 1980 (#80002662)	215 W. 57th St. 40°45′57″N 73°58′52″W	Midtown Manhattan	
10	American Radiator Building	American Radiator Building	May 7, 1980 (#80002663)	40–52 W. 40th St. 40°45′10″N 73°59′04″W	Midtown Manhattan	Black and gold building aka American Standard Building and recently The Bryant Park Hotel
11	Appellate Division Courthouse of New York State	Appellate Division Courthouse of New York State	July 26, 1982 (#82003366)	27 Madison Ave. 40°44′32″N 73°59′13″W	Madison Square	
12	Chester A. Arthur House	Chester A. Arthur House	October 15, 1966 (#66000534)	123 Lexington Ave. 40°44′34″N 73°58′57″W	Kips Bay	Home of former US president Chester A. Arthur
13	Association of the Bar of the City of New York	Association of the Bar of the City of New York	January 3, 1980 (#80002666)	42 W. 44th St. 40°45′18″N 73°58′57″W	Midtown Manhattan	
14	Bank of the Metropolis	Bank of the Metropolis	November 15, 2003 (#03001153)	31 Union Square West; 40°44′12″N 73°59′29″W	Union Square	
15	Biltmore Theater	Biltmore Theater	October 27, 2004 (#04001203)	261–265 W. 47th St. 40°45′37″N 73°59′14″W	Theater District	
16	Building at 304 Park Avenue South	Building at 304 Park Avenue South	March 15, 2005 (#05000167)	304 Park Ave. S 40°44′24″N 73°59′14″W	Flatiron District	
17	Building at 315–325 West 36th Street	Building at 315–325 West 36th Street	May 27, 2004 (#04000542)	315–325 W. 36th St. 40°45′15″N 73°59′39″W	Chelsea	
18	Candler Building	Candler Building	July 8, 1982 (#82003368)	220 West 42nd St. and 221 West 41st St. 40°45′22″N 73°59′18″W	Times Square	
19	Carnegie Hall	Carnegie Hall	October 15, 1966 (#66000535)	7th Ave., 56th to 57th Sts. 40°45′55″N 73°58′48″W	Theater District	Internationally-known classical music venue
20	Central IND Substation	Central IND Substation	February 9, 2006 (#06000019)	136 W. 53rd St. (btwn 6th & 7th); 40°45′44″N 73°58′52″W	Midtown Manhattan	
21	Central Synagogue	Central Synagogue	October 9, 1970 (#70000423)	646–652 Lexington Ave. 40°45′34″N 73°58′16″W	Midtown Manhattan	
22	Century Association Building	Century Association Building	July 15, 1982 (#82003369)	5–7 W. 43rd St. 40°45′16″N 73°58′52″W	Midtown Manhattan	
23	Century Building	Century Building	September 18, 1997 (#97001148)	33 E. 17th St. 40°44′13″N 73°59′25″W	Union Square	
24	Chanin Building	Chanin Building	April 23, 1980 (#80002676)	122 E. 42nd St. 40°45′04″N 73°58′32″W	Murray Hill	
25	Chelsea Historic District	Chelsea Historic District	December 6, 1977 (#77000954)	Roughly bounded by 19th and 22nd Sts., 9th and 10th Aves. 40°44′43″N 74°00′15″W	Chelsea	
26	Chrysler Building	Chrysler Building	December 8, 1976 (#76001237)	405 Lexington Ave. 40°45′05″N 73°58′31″W	Midtown East	
27	Church of St. Mary the Virgin Complex	Church of St. Mary the Virgin Complex	April 16, 1990 (#90000606)	145 W. 46th St. 40°45′30″N 73°59′02″W	Times Square	
28	Church of the Holy Apostles	Church of the Holy Apostles	April 26, 1972 (#72000867)	300 9th Ave. 40°44′57″N 73°59′57″W	Chelsea	
29	Church of the Holy Communion and Buildings	Church of the Holy Communion and Buildings	April 17, 1980 (#80002680)	656–662 6th Ave. 40°44′28″N 73°59′40″W	Flatiron District	Location of The Limelight nightclub
30	Church of the Immaculate Conception and Clergy Houses	Church of the Immaculate Conception and Clergy Houses	March 28, 1980 (#80002681)	406–414 E. 14th St. 40°43′52″N 73°58′56″W	East Village	
31	Church of the Incarnation and Parish House	Church of the Incarnation and Parish House	July 8, 1982 (#82003371)	205–209 Madison Ave. 40°44′54″N 73°58′57″W	Murray Hill	
32	Church of the Transfiguration and Rectory	Church of the Transfiguration and Rectory	June 4, 1973 (#73001216)	1 E. 29th St. 40°44′44″N 73°59′14″W	NoMad	
33	Church Missions House	Church Missions House	June 3, 1982 (#82003370)	281 Park Ave., S. 40°44′21″N 73°59′14″W	Gramercy Park	
34	CIRCLE LINE X (sightseeing vessel)	CIRCLE LINE X (sightseeing vessel)	September 22, 2014 (#14000702)	Pier 83 & West 42nd St. 40°45′46″N 74°00′06″W	Hell's Kitchen	Former World War II landing craft later used for sightseeing; being converted into a museum.
35	Civic Club	Civic Club	September 16, 1982 (#82003372)	243 E. 34th St. 40°44′41″N 73°58′34″W	Murray Hill	Nowadays it's the New York Estonian House.
36	Colony Arcade Building	Colony Arcade Building	September 10, 2014 (#14000580)	63–67 W. 38th St. 40°45′08″N 73°59′07″W	Garment District	Neo-Gothic 1912 building was crucial to city's developing fashion industry in the early 20th century. Now redeveloped into a hotel.
37	Columbus Monument	Columbus Monument	November 20, 2018 (#100003133)	Columbus Circle; 40°46′05″N 73°58′55″W	Midtown Manhattan	Italian sculptor Gaetano Rosso's only work in the U.S.; erected in 1892 for quadcentennial of Columbus's voyage.
38	Daily News Building	Daily News Building	November 14, 1982 (#82001191)	220 E. 42nd St. 40°44′58″N 73°58′25″W	Turtle Bay	
39	Decker Building	Decker Building	November 21, 2003 (#03001179)	33 Union Square W. 40°44′12″N 73°59′29″W	Union Square	
40	DeLamar Mansion	DeLamar Mansion	August 25, 1983 (#83001722)	233 Madison Ave. 40°44′59″N 73°58′54″W	Murray Hill	
41	Adelaide L. T. Douglas House	Adelaide L. T. Douglas House	July 15, 1982 (#82003373)	57 Park Ave. (btwn East 37 & 38); 40°44′57″N 73°58′48″W	Murray Hill	now the Guatemalan Mission to the UN
42	The Emerson	The Emerson	August 20, 2009 (#09000634)	554 W. 53rd St. 40°46′01″N 73°59′30″W	Hell's Kitchen	
43	Empire State Building	Empire State Building	November 17, 1982 (#82001192)	350 Fifth Ave. 40°44′53″N 73°59′10″W	Koreatown	Seventh tallest building in Manhattan and an international symbol of New York City
44	Engineering Societies' Building and Engineers' Club	Engineering Societies' Building and Engineers' Club	August 30, 2007 (#07000867)	23 and 25-33 W. 39th St. and 28, 32-34, and 36 W. 40th St. 40°45′09″N 73°59′04″W	Midtown Manhattan	Consists of the Engineering Societies' Building (25-33 W. 39th St.) and Engineers' Club Building (23 W. 39th St.; 28, 32-34, and 36 W. 40th St.)
45	ENTERPRISE (Space Shuttle)	ENTERPRISE (Space Shuttle)	March 13, 2013 (#13000071)	Pier 86, W. 46th St. and 12th Ave. 40°45′56″N 74°00′07″W	Hell's Kitchen	First Space Shuttle built; was never taken into orbit but helped immensely in development of later vehicles that were. Now on exhibit at the Intrepid Museum
46	Father Francis D. Duffy Statue and Duffy Square	Father Francis D. Duffy Statue and Duffy Square	March 12, 2001 (#01000243)	Triangle bounded by Broadway, Seventh Ave., W. 47th. and W. 46th St. 40°45′32″N 73°59′07″W	Times Square	
47	Film Center Building	Film Center Building	September 7, 1984 (#84002768)	630 9th Ave. 40°45′35″N 73°59′30″W	Hell's Kitchen	
48	Flatiron Building	Flatiron Building	November 20, 1979 (#79001603)	5th Ave. and Broadway; 40°44′29″N 73°59′27″W	Flatiron District	
49	Fred F. French Building	Fred F. French Building	January 28, 2004 (#03001514)	551 Fifth Ave. 40°45′20″N 73°58′47″W	Midtown Manhattan	
50	FRYING PAN SHOALS LIGHTSHIP NO. 115 (lightship)	FRYING PAN SHOALS LIGHTSHIP NO. 115 (lightship)	January 28, 1999 (#98001615)	Pier 66, W. 26th and West Side Highway. 40°45′00″N 74°00′37″W	Chelsea	
51	Garment Center Historic District	Garment Center Historic District	November 5, 2008 (#08001034)	Roughly bounded by Sixth Ave. on the E., Ninth Ave. on the W., W. 35th St. on the S., and W. 41st St. on the N. 40°45′14″N 73°59′25″W	Garment District	
52	General Electric Building	General Electric Building	January 28, 2004 (#03001515)	570 Lexington Ave. 40°45′26″N 73°58′38″W	Rockefeller Center	
53	General Society of Mechanics and Tradesmen	General Society of Mechanics and Tradesmen	November 12, 2008 (#08001048)	20 W. 44th St; 40°45′19″N 73°58′53″W	Midtown Manhattan	
54	George Washington Hotel	George Washington Hotel	May 20, 2019 (#100003931)	23 Lexington Ave. 40°44′23″N 73°59′03″W	Rose Hill	1930 Renaissance Revival apartment hotel, recently restored to that use, is the last major one from that era.
55	Germania Life Insurance Company Building	Germania Life Insurance Company Building	May 25, 2001 (#01000556)	50 Union Sq. E 40°44′12″N 73°59′21″W	Union Square	
56	Gilsey Hotel	Gilsey Hotel	December 14, 1978 (#78001872)	1200 Broadway; 40°44′45″N 73°59′19″W	NoMad	
57	Gramercy Park Historic District	Gramercy Park Historic District	January 23, 1980 (#80002691)	Roughly bounded by 3rd and Park Aves., S., E. 18th and 22nd Sts. 40°44′16″N 73°59′10″W	Gramercy Park	
58	Grand Central Terminal	Grand Central Terminal	January 17, 1975 (#75001206)	71–105 E. 42nd St. 40°45′10″N 73°58′35″W	Midtown Manhattan	1913 Beaux Arts landmark still used by Metro-North Railroad. Construction helped trigger development of Park Avenue.
59	Grand Central Terminal Park Avenue Viaduct	Grand Central Terminal Park Avenue Viaduct	August 11, 1983 (#83001726)	71–105 E. 42nd St., Park Ave. between E. 40th and E. 42nd Sts. 40°44′59″N 73°58′40″W	Pershing Square	Elevated roadway bringing Park Avenue around Grand Central Terminal
60	Grand Hotel	Grand Hotel	September 15, 1983 (#83001725)	1232–1238 Broadway; 40°44′50″N 73°59′19″W	NoMad	
61	Greenacre Park	Greenacre Park	February 2, 2018 (#100002076)	217 E 51st St. 40°45′23″N 73°58′09″W	Midtown East	Small park with modernist design in mid-block, built 1971 on land donated by Abby Rockefeller Mauzé, is an early pocket park
62	Greenwich Savings Bank	Greenwich Savings Bank	November 16, 2005 (#05001286)	1352–1362 Broadway; 40°45′05″N 73°59′15″W	Near Herald Square	
63	Harvard Club of New York City	Harvard Club of New York City	March 28, 1980 (#80002693)	27 W. 44th St. 40°45′18″N 73°58′53″W	Midtown Manhattan	
64	Hotel Chelsea	Hotel Chelsea	December 27, 1977 (#77000958)	222 W. 23rd St. 40°44′35″N 73°59′39″W	Chelsea	
65	Hotel Gerard	Hotel Gerard	February 10, 1983 (#83001729)	123 W. 44th St. 40°45′48″N 73°59′34″W	Midtown Manhattan	
66	Hotel Martinique	Hotel Martinique	January 30, 2025 (#100011342)	49 West 32nd Street; 40°44′54″N 73°59′16″W	Midtown South	
67	House at 146 East 38th Street	House at 146 East 38th Street	May 21, 2008 (#08000450)	146 E. 38th St. 40°44′55″N 73°58′37″W	Murray Hill	
69	House at 20 West 16th St	House at 20 West 16th St	May 30, 2007 (#07000484)	20 W. 16th St. 40°44′15″N 73°59′40″W	Chelsea	
70	House at 203 East 29 Street	House at 203 East 29 Street	July 8, 1982 (#82003377)	203 E. 29th St. 40°44′33″N 73°58′49″W	Rose Hill	
71	Houses at 311 and 313 East 58th Street	Houses at 311 and 313 East 58th Street	November 14, 1982 (#82001197)	311–313 E. 58th St. 40°45′35″N 73°57′53″W	Midtown East	
72	Houses at 326, 328 and 330 East 18th Street	Houses at 326, 328 and 330 East 18th Street	September 30, 1982 (#82003380)	326–330 E. 18th St. 40°44′03″N 73°58′57″W	Kips Bay	
73	Houses at 437–459 West 24th Street	Houses at 437–459 West 24th Street	October 29, 1982 (#82001196)	437–459 W. 24th St. 40°44′53″N 74°00′11″W	Chelsea	
74	Houses at 647, 651–53 Fifth Avenue and 4 East 52nd Street	Houses at 647, 651–53 Fifth Avenue and 4 East 52nd Street	September 8, 1983 (#83001733)	647, 651–53 5th Ave. and 4 E. 52nd St. 40°45′34″N 73°58′36″W	Midtown Manhattan	Consists of the Morton F. Plant House (Cartier Building) and 647 Fifth Avenue (Versace Building)
75	JOHN J. HARVEY (fireboat)	JOHN J. HARVEY (fireboat)	June 15, 2000 (#00000576)	Pier 63, North R. 40°45′00″N 74°00′39″W	Chelsea	
76	Hudson Theatre	Hudson Theatre	November 15, 2016 (#16000780)	139–141 W. 44th St. 40°45′25″N 73°59′05″W	Theater District	Israels & Harder theater built in 1903 was home to many important Broadway shows
77	Knickerbocker Hotel	Knickerbocker Hotel	April 11, 1980 (#80002697)	142 W. 42nd St. 40°45′19″N 73°59′12″W	Times Square	
78	Knox Building	Knox Building	June 3, 1982 (#82003381)	452 5th Ave. 40°45′08″N 73°58′57″W	Midtown	
79	Lamb's Club	Lamb's Club	June 3, 1982 (#82003382)	128 W. 44th St. 40°45′23″N 73°59′07″W	Times Square	Former home of the Lamb's Club, renovated into a hotel in 2010.
80	James F. D. Lanier Residence	James F. D. Lanier Residence	June 3, 1982 (#82003383)	123 E. 35th 40°44′51″N 73°58′49″W	Murray Hill	
81	Lescaze House	Lescaze House	May 19, 1980 (#80002698)	211 E. 48th St. 40°45′15″N 73°58′17″W	Midtown East	
82	Lever House	Lever House	October 2, 1983 (#83004078)	390 Park Ave. 40°45′34″N 73°58′23″W	Midtown Manhattan	
83	Lincoln Building	Lincoln Building	September 8, 1983 (#83001735)	1 Union Sq. W. 40°44′08″N 73°59′32″W	Union Square	
84	Lithuanian Alliance of America	Lithuanian Alliance of America	November 2, 2022 (#100008334)	307 West 30th St. 40°45′00″N 73°59′45″W		
85	Look Building	Look Building	February 24, 2005 (#05000087)	488 Madison Ave. 40°45′31″N 73°58′33″W	Midtown East	
86	R. H. Macy and Company Store	R. H. Macy and Company Store	June 2, 1978 (#78001873)	151 W. 34th St. 40°45′41″N 73°58′22″W	Herald Square	Home of first major American department store.
87	Marble Collegiate Reformed Church	Marble Collegiate Reformed Church	April 9, 1980 (#80002699)	275 5th Ave. 40°44′44″N 73°59′15″W	NoMad	
88	McGraw-Hill Building	McGraw-Hill Building	March 28, 1980 (#80002701)	326 W. 42nd St. 40°45′25″N 73°59′31″W	Hell's Kitchen	
89	Mecca Temple	Mecca Temple	September 7, 1984 (#84002788)	131 N. 55th St. 40°45′50″N 73°58′48″W	Midtown Manhattan	Known as New York City Center Theater. Moorish-revival interior and exterior details. Harry P. Knowles, architect.
90	Merchants Refrigerating Company Warehouse	Merchants Refrigerating Company Warehouse	May 31, 1985 (#85001171)	501 W. 16th St. 40°44′38″N 74°00′28″W	Chelsea	
91	Metropolitan Life Home Office Complex	Metropolitan Life Home Office Complex	January 19, 1996 (#95001544)	Roughly bounded by Madison Ave., E. 23rd St., Park Ave. S. and E. 25th St. 40°44′28″N 73°59′14″W	Flatiron District	Composed of the Metropolitan Life Insurance Company Tower and Metropolitan Life North Building
92	Metropolitan Life Insurance Company	Metropolitan Life Insurance Company	June 2, 1978 (#78001874)	1 Madison Ave. 40°44′29″N 73°59′16″W	Flatiron District	
93	William H. Moore House	William H. Moore House	March 16, 1972 (#72000878)	4 E. 54th St. 40°45′38″N 73°58′31″W	Midtown Manhattan	
94	Paddy's Market Historic District	Paddy's Market Historic District	April 28, 2022 (#100007686)	450-547 9th Ave.; 367 West 35th, 362, 365-367 West 36th, 354-356 West 37th, 355-357 West 38th, 352-354, 405-411 West 39th, 356, 401-410 West 40th Sts. 40°45′17″N 73°59′43″W		
95	Pierpont Morgan Library	Pierpont Morgan Library	November 13, 1966 (#66000544)	33 E. 36th St. 40°44′56″N 73°58′54″W	Murray Hill	Now known as "The Morgan Library & Museum"
96	Murray Hill Historic District	Murray Hill Historic District	October 5, 2003 (#03000997)	E. 34th, 35th, 36th, 37th, 38th & 39th Sts., Lexington, Madison & Park Aves. 40°44′54″N 73°58′47″W	Murray Hill	One of last intact 19th-century residential districts in Manhattan; many buildings by prominent architects. Boundary increase on February 27, 2013.
97	New Amsterdam Theater	New Amsterdam Theater	January 10, 1980 (#80002664)	214 W. 42nd St. 40°45′21″N 73°59′18″W	Theater District	
98	New York Bible Society	New York Bible Society	February 5, 2014 (#13001152)	5 E. 48th St. 40°45′26″N 73°58′39″W	Midtown Manhattan	Since 1978 in use by the Swedish Seamen's Church
99	New York Life Building	New York Life Building	June 2, 1978 (#78001876)	51 Madison Ave. 40°44′34″N 73°59′09″W	Flatiron District	
100	New York Public Library	New York Public Library	October 15, 1966 (#66000546)	5th Ave. and 42nd St. 40°45′12″N 73°58′56″W	Midtown Manhattan	Main branch of New York Public Library system; one of the world's largest public libraries.
101	New York Public Library and Bryant Park	New York Public Library and Bryant Park	October 15, 1966 (#66000547)	Avenue of the Americas, 5th Ave., 40th and 42nd Sts. 40°45′12″N 73°58′56″W	Midtown Manhattan	
102	New York Savings Bank	New York Savings Bank	January 7, 2000 (#99001657)	81 Eighth Ave. 40°44′24″N 74°00′11″W	Chelsea	
103	New York School of Applied Design	New York School of Applied Design	December 16, 1982 (#82001202)	160 Lexington Ave. 40°44′38″N 73°58′56″W	Murray Hill	
104	New York Yacht Club	New York Yacht Club	October 29, 1982 (#82001203)	37 W. 44th St. 40°45′19″N 73°58′54″W	Midtown	
105	Andrew Norwood House	Andrew Norwood House	July 9, 1979 (#79001606)	241 W. 14th St. 40°44′23″N 74°00′07″W	Chelsea	
106	Old Colony Club	Old Colony Club	April 23, 1980 (#80002706)	120 Madison Ave. 40°44′43″N 73°59′06″W	Rose Hill	
107	Old Grolier Club	Old Grolier Club	April 23, 1980 (#80002707)	29 E. 32nd St. 40°44′47″N 73°59′02″W	Rose Hill	
108	Osborne Apartments	Osborne Apartments	April 22, 1993 (#93000333)	205 W. 57th St. 40°45′56″N 73°58′51″W	Midtown Manhattan	
109	Pier 57	Pier 57	August 11, 2004 (#04000821)	Eleventh Ave. at end of W. 15th St. 40°44′37″N 74°00′40″W	Chelsea	
110	The Players	The Players	October 15, 1966 (#66000549)	16 Gramercy Park; 40°44′15″N 73°59′13″W	Gramercy Park	
111	Plaza Hotel	Plaza Hotel	November 29, 1978 (#78001878)	Fifth Ave. and Fifty-ninth St. 40°45′51″N 73°58′27″W	Grand Army Plaza	Famous Upper East Side hotel being remodeled into condos. Setting for Eloise books.
112	Prince George Hotel	Prince George Hotel	February 12, 1999 (#99000195)	10–20 E. 28th and 17–19 E. 27 Sts. 40°44′41″N 73°59′12″W	NoMad	
113	Public Baths	Public Baths	April 23, 1980 (#80002709)	Asser Levy Pl. and E. 23rd St. 40°44′09″N 73°58′35″W	Kips Bay	
114	Public School 35	Public School 35	October 27, 1980 (#80002710)	931 1st Ave. 40°45′17″N 73°57′57″W	Turtle Bay	
115	Queensboro Bridge	Queensboro Bridge	December 20, 1978 (#78001879)	59th St. 40°45′26″N 73°57′22″W	Lenox Hill and Roosevelt Island	Also listed in the Borough of Queens
116	R & S Building	R & S Building	September 22, 1986 (#86002683)	492 First Ave. 40°44′26″N 73°58′31″W	Kips Bay	
117	Racquet and Tennis Club Building	Racquet and Tennis Club Building	July 13, 1983 (#83001741)	370 Park Ave. 40°45′31″N 73°58′25″W	Midtown Manhattan	Ornate private club; now a foil
118	Radio City Music Hall	Radio City Music Hall	May 8, 1978 (#78001880)	1260 Avenue of the Americas (50th and 6th); 40°45′36″N 73°59′03″W	Rockefeller Center	Major live-entertainment venue since the 1920s; home to the Rockettes
119	Residences at 5-15 West 54th Street	Residences at 5-15 West 54th Street	January 4, 1990 (#89002260)	5–15 W. 54th St. 40°45′42″N 73°58′35″W	Midtown Manhattan	Consists of five residences at 5, 7, 9–11, 13, and 15 West 54th Street.
120	Rockefeller Center	Rockefeller Center	December 23, 1987 (#87002591)	Bounded by Fifth Ave., W. Forty-eighth St., Seventh Ave., & W. Fifty-first St. 40°45′32″N 73°58′46″W	Midtown Manhattan	Trend-setting urban office complex. Home to many NBC broadcasts. Setting and location for 2000s sitcom 30 Rock.
121	Bayard Rustin Residence	Bayard Rustin Residence	March 8, 2016 (#16000062)	340 W. 28th St. (Building 7B Apartment 9J of Penn South); 40°44′56″N 73°59′52″W	Chelsea	Bayard Rustin, a civil rights activist who later came out and fought for gay rights, lived in this apartment building for most of his later life
122	St. Bartholomew's Church and Community House	St. Bartholomew's Church and Community House	April 16, 1980 (#80002719)	109 E. 50th St. 40°45′26″N 73°58′25″W	Midtown East	
123	St. George's Episcopal Church	St. George's Episcopal Church	December 8, 1976 (#76001249)	E. 16th St. and Rutherford Place; 40°44′04″N 73°59′06″W	Stuyvesant Square	
124	St. Luke's Evangelical Lutheran Church	St. Luke's Evangelical Lutheran Church	June 1, 2007 (#07000483)	208 W. 46th St. 40°45′35″N 73°59′21″W	Midtown	
125	St. Patrick's Cathedral Complex	St. Patrick's Cathedral Complex	December 8, 1976 (#76001250)	Bounded by 5th and Madison Aves., E. 50th and E. 51st Sts. 40°45′31″N 73°58′35″W	Midtown	
126	St. Peter's Church	St. Peter's Church	August 4, 2025 (#100012060)	619 Lexington Avenue; 40°45′31″N 73°58′14″W	Midtown East	
127	St. Thomas Church and Parish House	St. Thomas Church and Parish House	April 9, 1980 (#80002722)	1–3 W. 53rd St. 40°45′39″N 73°58′36″W	Midtown	
128	Salmagundi Club	Salmagundi Club	July 25, 1974 (#74001275)	47 5th Ave. 40°44′03″N 73°59′00″W	Kips Bay	
129	Margaret Sanger Clinic	Margaret Sanger Clinic	May 26, 1983 (#93001599)	17 W. 16th St. 40°44′17″N 73°59′39″W	Chelsea	Workplace of birth control pioneer Margaret Sanger, located at 17 West 16th Street. Originally designated as NRHP site #83001730 on May 26, 1983, under the name "House at 17 West 16th Street". Redesignated as NHL (NRHP site #93001599) on September 14, 1993.
130	Scribner Building	Scribner Building	May 6, 1980 (#80002715)	153–157 5th Ave. 40°44′25″N 73°59′27″W	Flatiron District	Known also as the Old Scribner Building. Note, Charles Scribner Building is different.
131	Seagram Building	Seagram Building	February 24, 2006 (#06000056)	375 Park Ave. 40°45′30″N 73°58′22″W	Midtown Manhattan	Milestone modernist building by Ludwig Mies van der Rohe
132	Seville Hotel	Seville Hotel	February 24, 2005 (#05000088)	22 East 29th St. 40°44′40″N 73°59′10″W	NoMad	
133	Sidewalk Clock at 200 5th Avenue, Manhattan	Sidewalk Clock at 200 5th Avenue, Manhattan	April 18, 1985 (#85000927)	200 5th Ave. 40°44′30″N 73°59′24″W	Flatiron District	
134	Sidewalk Clock at 519 3rd Avenue, Manhattan	Sidewalk Clock at 519 3rd Avenue, Manhattan	April 18, 1985 (#85000928)	519 3rd Ave. 40°44′46″N 73°58′41″W	Murray Hill	No longer in location.
135	Sidewalk Clock at 522 5th Avenue, Manhattan	Sidewalk Clock at 522 5th Avenue, Manhattan	April 18, 1985 (#85000929)	522 5th Ave. 40°45′16″N 73°58′50″W	Midtown Manhattan	
136	Sniffen Court Historic District	Sniffen Court Historic District	November 28, 1973 (#73001224)	E. 36th St., between Lexington and 3rd Aves. 40°44′51″N 73°58′40″W	Murray Hill	
137	Society for the Lying-In Hospital	Society for the Lying-In Hospital	September 1, 1983 (#83001746)	305 2nd Ave. 40°44′05″N 73°59′03″W	Gramercy Park	
138	Stuyvesant Square Historic District	Stuyvesant Square Historic District	November 21, 1980 (#80002723)	Roughly bounded by Nathan D. Perleman Pl., 3rd Ave., E. 18th and E. 15th Sts. 40°44′02″N 73°59′06″W	Gramercy Park	
139	Substation 13	Substation 13	February 9, 2006 (#06000026)	225 W 53rd St. 40°45′50″N 73°59′03″W	Midtown Manhattan	
140	Substation 42	Substation 42	February 9, 2006 (#06000024)	154 E. 57th St. 40°45′37″N 73°58′07″W	Midtown Manhattan	
141	Ed Sullivan Theater	Ed Sullivan Theater	November 17, 1997 (#97001303)	1697–1699 Broadway; 40°45′49″N 73°59′00″W	Theater District	
142	Sutton Place Historic District	Sutton Place Historic District	September 12, 1985 (#85002294)	1–21 Sutton Pl. & 4–16 Sutton Sq. 40°45′28″N 73°57′57″W	Sutton Place	
143	Theodore Roosevelt Birthplace National Historic Site	Theodore Roosevelt Birthplace National Historic Site	October 15, 1966 (#66000054)	28 E. 20th St. 40°44′18″N 73°59′21″W	Flatiron District	Replica of the birthplace of Theodore Roosevelt
144	Tiffany and Company Building	Tiffany and Company Building	June 2, 1978 (#78001886)	401 5th Ave., at 36th 40°45′00″N 73°58′53″W	Midtown Manhattan	Former Tiffany's building
145	Samuel J. Tilden House	Samuel J. Tilden House	May 11, 1976 (#76001251)	14–15 Gramercy Park South; 40°44′15″N 73°59′14″W	Gramercy Park	Also known as "National Arts Club". Home of Tilden, winner of popular vote in disputed 1876 presidential election
146	Times Square Hotel	Times Square Hotel	May 4, 1995 (#95000530)	255 W. 43rd St. 40°45′28″N 73°59′22″W	Times Square	
147	Times Square-42nd Street Subway Station	Times Square-42nd Street Subway Station	September 17, 2004 (#04001016)	Junction of W. 42nd St. and Broadway/7th Ave. 40°45′19″N 73°59′15″W	Times Square	Subway station (1, 2, 3, 7, <7>, N, Q, R, W, and S trains)
148	Town Hall	Town Hall	April 23, 1980 (#80002724)	113–123 W. 43rd St. 40°45′21″N 73°59′05″W	Midtown Manhattan	Public-affairs media developed here with "America's Town Hall of the Air" radio program in 1930s. Has been host to many major artists as concert venue.
149	Trinity Chapel Complex	Trinity Chapel Complex	December 16, 1982 (#82001205)	15 W. 25th St. 40°44′37″N 73°59′25″W	NoMad	
150	Tudor City Historic District	Tudor City Historic District	September 11, 1986 (#86002516)	Roughly bounded by Forty-third St., First Ave., Forty-first St., and Second Ave. 40°44′56″N 73°58′17″W	Turtle Bay	
151	Turtle Bay Gardens Historic District	Turtle Bay Gardens Historic District	July 21, 1983 (#83001750)	226–246 E. 49th St. and 227–245 E. 48th St. 40°45′15″N 73°58′13″W	Turtle Bay	
152	U.S. General Post Office	U.S. General Post Office	January 29, 1973 (#73002257)	8th Ave. between 31st and 33rd Sts. 40°45′37″N 73°59′03″W	Midtown Manhattan	
153	Union Square	Union Square	December 9, 1997 (#97001678)	Bounded by E 14th & E 17th Sts. and Union Square East & Union Square West; 40°44′10″N 73°59′25″W	Union Square	Site of many political demonstrations over the years
154	United Charities Building Complex	United Charities Building Complex	March 28, 1985 (#85000661)	105 E. 22nd St,. 289 Park Ave. S. and 111-113 E. 22nd St. 40°44′22″N 73°59′14″W	Gramercy Park	
155	University Club	University Club	April 16, 1980 (#80002726)	1 W. 54th St. 40°45′40″N 73°58′34″W	Midtown Manhattan	
156	US Post Office-Madison Square Station	US Post Office-Madison Square Station	May 11, 1989 (#88002364)	149–153 E. 23rd St. 40°44′23″N 73°59′04″W	Gramercy Park	
157	US Post Office-Old Chelsea Station	US Post Office-Old Chelsea Station	May 11, 1989 (#88002365)	217 W. 18th St. 40°46′07″N 73°59′56″W	Chelsea	
158	USS INTREPID (aircraft carrier)	USS INTREPID (aircraft carrier)	January 14, 1986 (#86000082)	Intrepid Sq., 45th and West Side Highway; 40°45′51″N 73°59′59″W	Hell's Kitchen	A Essex-class aircraft carrier launched in 1943. Used as the Intrepid Museum since 1982.
159	Villard Houses	Villard Houses	September 2, 1975 (#75001210)	29½ 50th St., 24-26 E. 51st St., and 451, 453, 455, and 457 Madison Ave. 40°45′29″N 73°58′31″W	Midtown Manhattan	
160	Webster Hotel	Webster Hotel	September 7, 1984 (#84002806)	40 W. 45th St. 40°45′22″N 73°58′56″W	Midtown Manhattan	
161	West 28th Street Subway Station (Dual System IRT)	West 28th Street Subway Station (Dual System IRT)	March 30, 2005 (#05000235)	Seventh Ave. bet. West 26th and West 29th Sts. 40°44′48″N 73°59′39″W	Chelsea	Subway station (1 and 2 trains)
162	The Wilbraham	The Wilbraham	May 4, 2018 (#100002386)	284 5th Ave. 40°44′46″N 73°59′12″W	NoMad	1888 Romanesque Revival building original built as bachelor flats, complete with communal dining room
163	R. C. Williams Warehouse	R. C. Williams Warehouse	February 24, 2005 (#05000086)	259–273 Tenth Ave. 40°44′57″N 74°00′14″W	Chelsea	
164	Women's Liberation Center	Women's Liberation Center	May 17, 2021 (#100006509)	243 West 20th St. 40°44′35″N 73°59′56″W	Chelsea	Now Nontraditional Employment for Women (NEW)
165	Women's National Republican Club	Women's National Republican Club	February 27, 2013 (#13000040)	3 W. 51st St. 40°45′34″N 73°58′39″W	Midtown Manhattan	Georgian home of early women's political organization

== See also ==
- County: National Register of Historic Places listings in New York County, New York
- State: National Register of Historic Places listings in New York
- Municipal: List of New York City Designated Landmarks in Manhattan from 14th to 59th Streets
