= East 17th Street/Irving Place Historic District =

Historic district in Manhattan, New York

Coordinates: 40°44′10″N 73°59′17″W

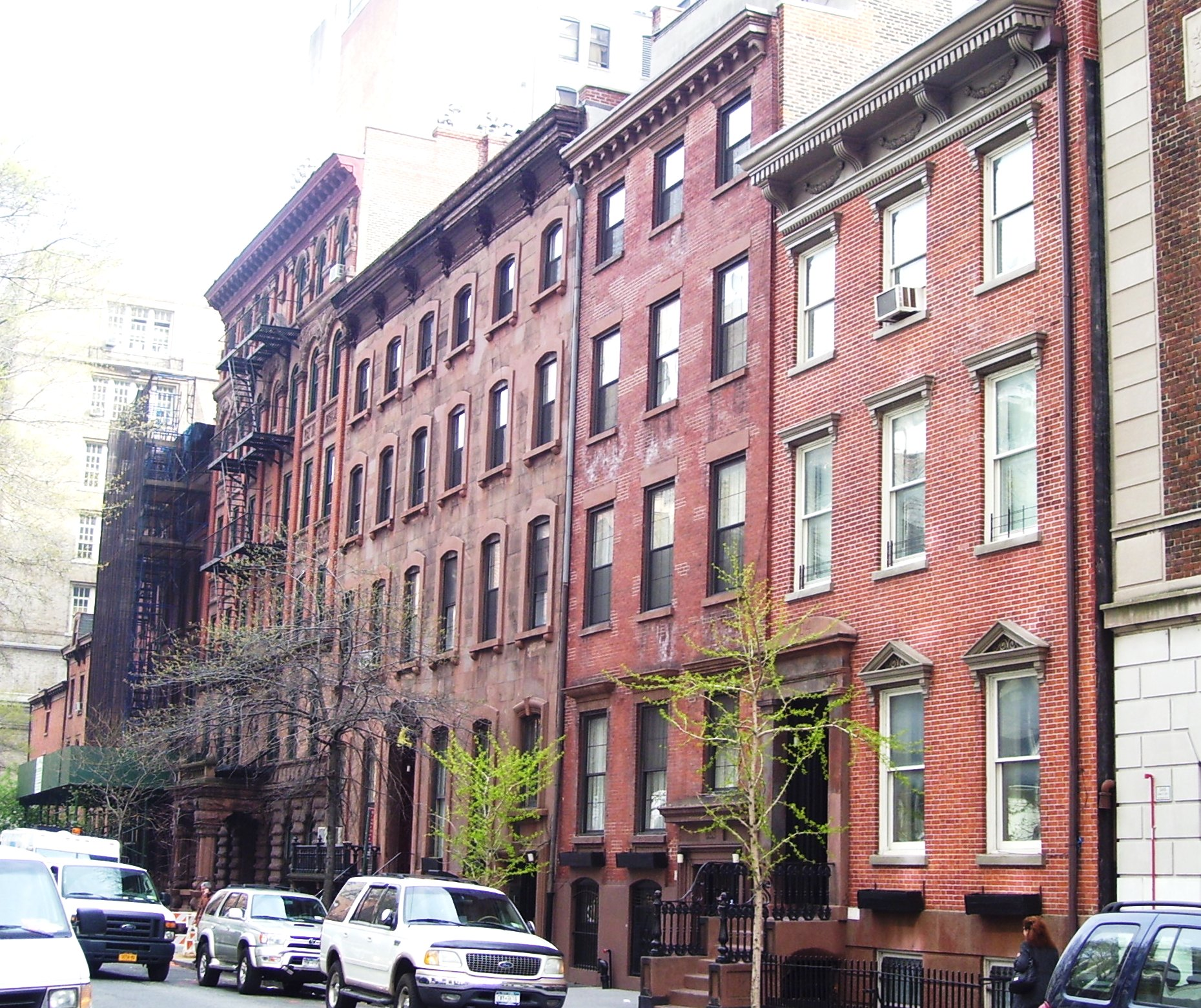
104 (right) to 122 (left) East 17th Street

The East 17th Street/Irving Place Historic District is a small historic district located primarily on East 17th Street between Union Square East and Irving Place in the Union Square neighborhood of Manhattan, New York City. It was designated by the New York City Landmarks Preservation Commission on June 30, 1988, and encompasses nine mid-19th century rowhouses and apartment buildings on the south side of East 17th Street, from number 104 to number 122, plus one additional building at 47 Irving Place just south of 17th Street.

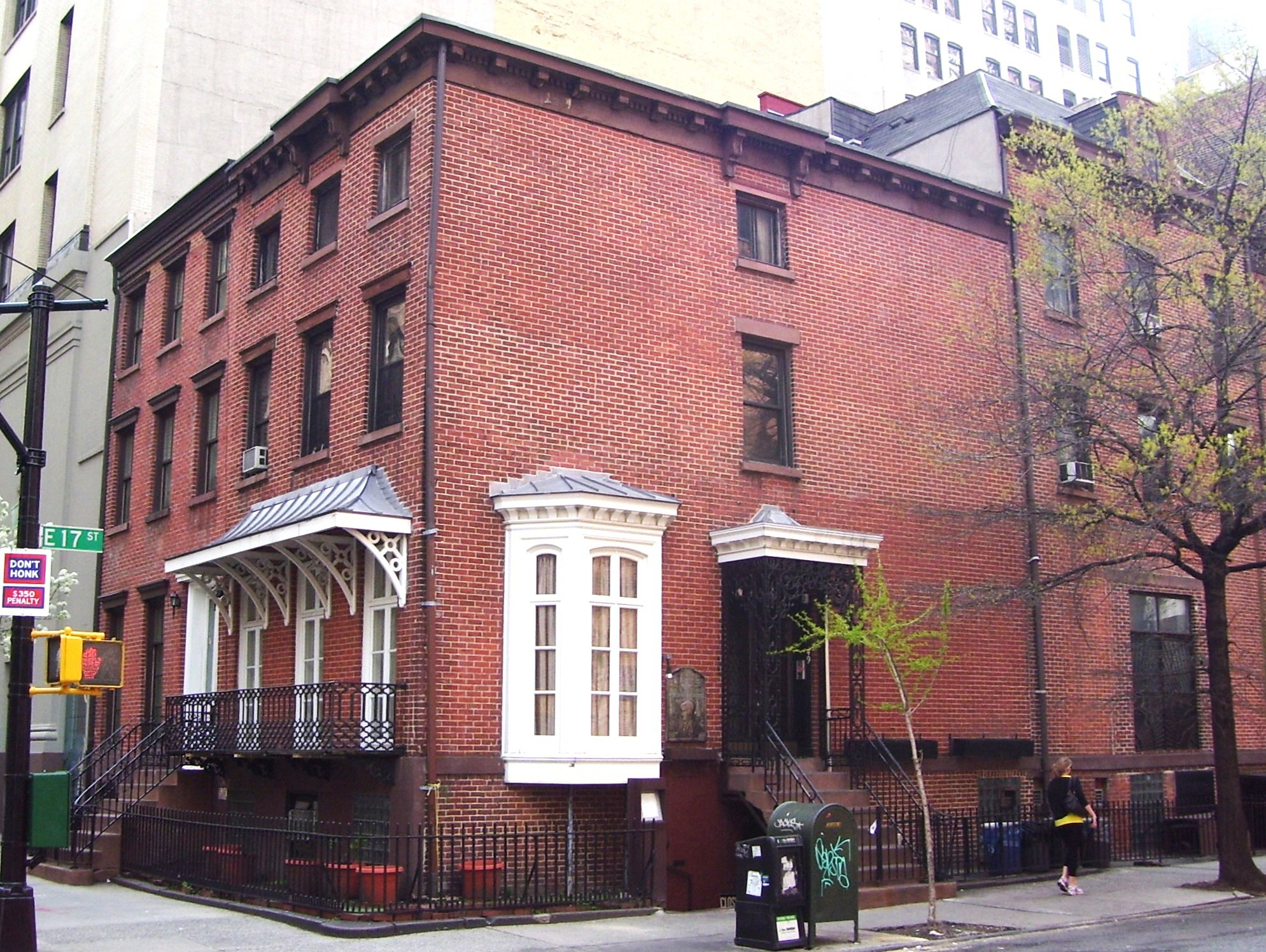
An unfounded local legend claims that writer Washington Irving, for whom Irving Place is named, lived in the house in the foreground house, 122 East 17th Street, also known as 49 Irving Place; also in the photo is 47 Irving Place.

Most of the houses in the district were built in the aftermath of the opening of Union Square in 1839, after which the area became one of the most sought-after residential districts in the city. The houses were primarily made in the Greek Revival and Italianate styles, while later apartment buildings in the district were in the Renaissance Revival style. By 1938, all the single-family dwellings in the district had been converted into apartment buildings.

One of the most significant structures in the district is 122 East 17th Street, also known as 49 Irving Place, which was built in 1843-44 as one of three Greek Revival row houses, along with 47 Irving Place and another no longer extant. It was extended along 17th Street c.1853-54, at which time Italianate features were added. Additional changes were made c.1868-70. Despite a historical plaque on the 17th Street facade, there is no historical evidence for the local legend that Washington Irving lived in this house, although his nephew, Edgar Irving, did live next door at 120 East 17th Street, and had a son named Washington Irving after the writer. Elsie de Wolfe and Elisabeth Marbury, called by The New York Times the "most fashionable Lesbian couple of Victorian New York" lived here from 1892–1911, and de Wolfe may have been instrumental in spreading the Irving rumor.

== See also ==
- List of New York City Designated Landmarks in Manhattan from 14th to 59th Streets
- Ladies' Mile Historic District
- Flatiron District
- Irving Place
- Gramercy Park
- Stuyvesant Square
