= 146 East 38th Street =

Historic building in Manhattan, New York

- U.S. National Register of Historic Places
- U.S. Historic district – Contributing property
- New York State Register of Historic Places
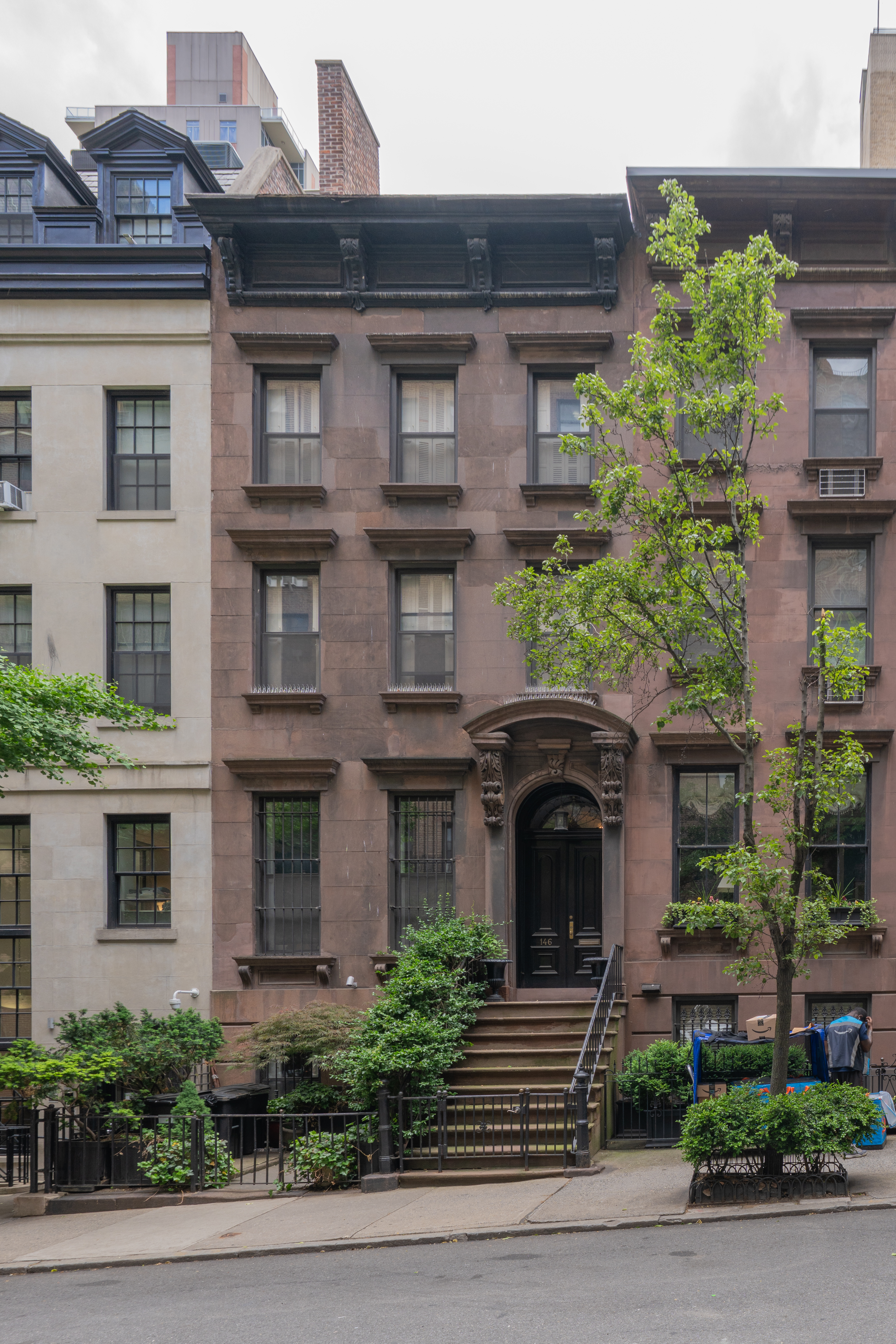
- (2026)

- Location within New York City Location within New York Location within the United States
- Location: 146 East 38th Street; Manhattan, New York City
- Coordinates: 40°44′54.9″N 73°58′38.3″W
- Built: 1860–61
- Built by: Benjamin Wise Jr. Joseph Whitehead
- Architectural style: Italianate
- Part of: Murray Hill Historic District (ID03000997)
- NRHP reference No.: 08000450
- NYSRHP No.: 06101.016523

Significant dates
- Added to NRHP: May 21, 2008
- Designated CP: February 27, 2013
- Designated NYSRHP: March 25, 2008

146 East 38th Street is a historic house located between Lexington and Third avenues in the Murray Hill neighborhood of Manhattan in New York City. Constructed from 1860 to 1861, it is one of the few intact Italianate brownstone rowhouses in Manhattan. The building was added to the National Register of Historic Places in 2008.

== History ==
The house is part of a group of six Italianate brownstone rowhouses (Nos. 140 to 150) that were built on the south side of East 38th Street by Joseph Whitehead and Benjamin Wise Jr. from 1860 to 1861. While the other townhouses in the group have since undergone alterations, such as the removal of their stoops, No. 146 has largely remained unchanged. It is one of the few intact Italianate brownstone homes in Manhattan.

The building was owned by Ms. Marion Leslie from 1861 to 1916, but appears to have been an investment property, as it was occupied by a number of different people. At the turn of the century, a resident of the house was Thomas Curtis Clarke, who was described by The New York Times as being "one of the best-known civil engineers in America." He died at home in June 1901 after falling ill, and his funeral was held at the house. In the middle of the twentieth century, another resident of the house was poet and author Barbara Leslie Jordan, who married John I. Yellott at the home in June 1951.

In 1998, the building was purchased for $1.14 million by a group of three men, who renovated the structure while preserving its historic details, and sold it the following year for $2.7 million. The house, which was added to the National Register of Historic Places on May 21, 2008, is privately owned as of 2016.

== Architecture ==
The house contains three stories and a high basement. The building's front façade is faced with brownstone and is divided vertically into three bays, with three windows on the second and third floors and two windows and an entrance on the first floor and the basement. On the basement level, the façade has large rusticated blocks with two windows set behind iron grilles and a secondary entrance below the stoop. The stone stoop is flanked by metal railings and leads up to the primary entrance on the first floor, which is a wood paneled double door in an arched opening topped with paneled spandrels, an ornamental keystone, and brackets decorated in floral patterns that support a segmental pediment. The windows on the first floor next to the primary entrance have molded lintels and footed sills. On the second and third floors, the windows have similar designs, except that the console brackets supporting the sills are smaller in size and less ornate. A cornice runs above the third floor and is supported by four console brackets with paneling in between. The interior of the house includes marble fireplaces, Italianate molding, and a wooden staircase with banister that is topped by a skylight on the third floor.

== See also ==
- National Register of Historic Places listings in Manhattan from 14th to 59th Streets
