= R & S Building =

Historic building in Manhattan, New York

- U.S. National Register of Historic Places
- New York State Register of Historic Places
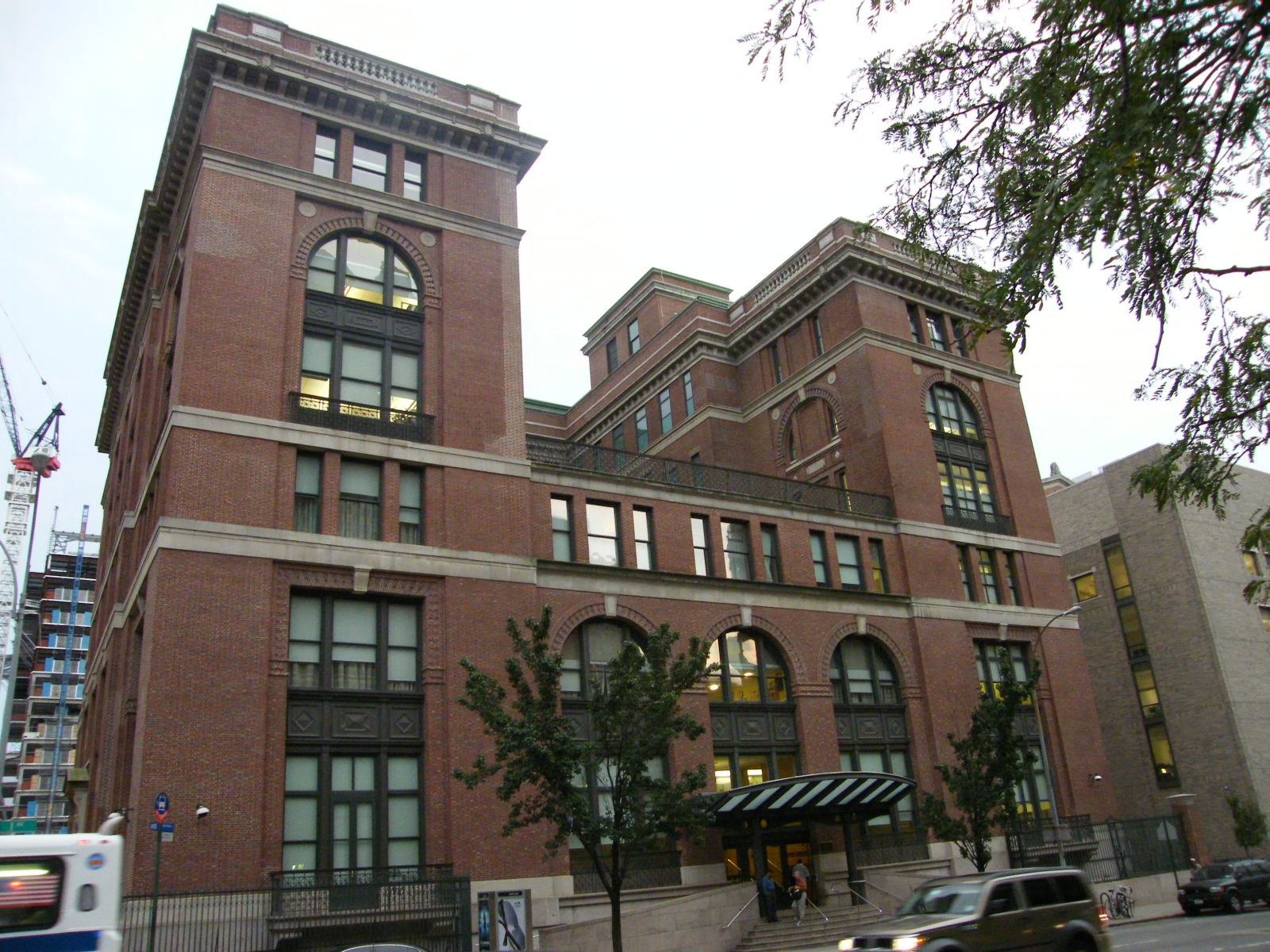
- The building viewed from First Avenue in 2008

- Location within New York City Location within New York Location within the United States
- Location: 492 First Avenue; Manhattan, New York, U.S.
- Coordinates: 40°44′25″N 73°58′32″W
- Built: 1912
- Architect: McKim, Mead & White
- Architectural style: Italian Renaissance
- Restored: 1999–2001
- NRHP reference No.: 86002683
- NYSRHP No.: 06101.015187

Significant dates
- Added to NRHP: September 22, 1986
- Designated NYSRHP: August 15, 1986

The R & S Building, also known as the Nicholas Scoppetta Children's Center, is a historic structure located at the southeast corner of First Avenue and East 29th Street in the Kips Bay neighborhood of Manhattan in New York City, New York, U.S. Designed in 1903 by McKim, Mead & White as part of the firm's master plan for Bellevue Hospital, it was built to accommodate the hospital's pathological building and a dormitory for male staff. The building also housed the city's Office of Chief Medical Examiner until 1961. From the late 1970s until the late 1990s, the R & S Building sat vacant, during which time it was added to the National Register of Historic Places. The structure was renovated around the turn of the century and has housed an intake center for children entering foster care since 2001.

== History ==
=== Development ===
In 1903, the architectural firm of McKim, Mead & White prepared a master plan for the phased development of new facilities for Bellevue Hospital for the area on the east side of First Avenue between East 26th and 29th streets in the Kips Bay neighborhood of Manhattan. The designs for the complex called for an interconnected series of multi-story buildings. The master plan included a building for the pathological department and a male dormitory at the northwest corner of the campus. In addition to the R & S Building, other buildings that were constructed from McKim, Mead & White's master plan included the A-B, C-D, F-G, I-K, and L-M buildings.

Plans for construction of a six-story, 142-by-120-foot (43 by 37 m) building containing the pathological department and male dormitory were filed by McKim, Mead & White in 1907. The plans called for machinery in the cellar, a morgue on the ground and second floors, laboratories on the third through sixth floors, as well as a roofhouse with cages, observation rooms and an operating room for bacteriological testing of animals. The second through sixth floors also called for dormitories for hospital staff. The pathological department was located on the north side of the building and the dormitory was located on the south side; these were separated by a 12-inch (30 cm) brick wall. The R & S Building was completed in 1912; it was the second of the new buildings to be completed on the hospital's campus, following Pavilion A & B.

=== Usage ===
The city's morgue moved into the R & S Building in 1912; before this, the morgue had been located next to a pier on the East River at the foot of East 26th Street. In 1918, the position of the New York City Medical Examiner was established. The Office of Chief Medical Examiner of the City of New York (OCME) remained in the R & S Building until 1961, when it moved into a new facility at the northeast corner of First Avenue and East 30th Street. While it was housed in the R & S Building, the OCME handled all of Manhattan's autopsies and select ones for the other boroughs of New York City and developed new techniques in forensic medicine including methods to identify blood stains on evidence for criminal trials.

After the OCME moved out, the R & S Building was used as a laboratory by Bellevue and New York University until the late 1970s, when it was removed from service by the New York City Health and Hospitals Corporation and planned to be demolished. However, the structure was saved from the wrecking ball due to economic reasons. While the building sat unused, its interior became badly deteriorated due to water leaks in the roof. The R & S Building was added to the National Register of Historic Places in 1986. Around this time, the building was planned to be restored and converted into office and laboratory space; however, the building would remain vacant until the late 1990s.

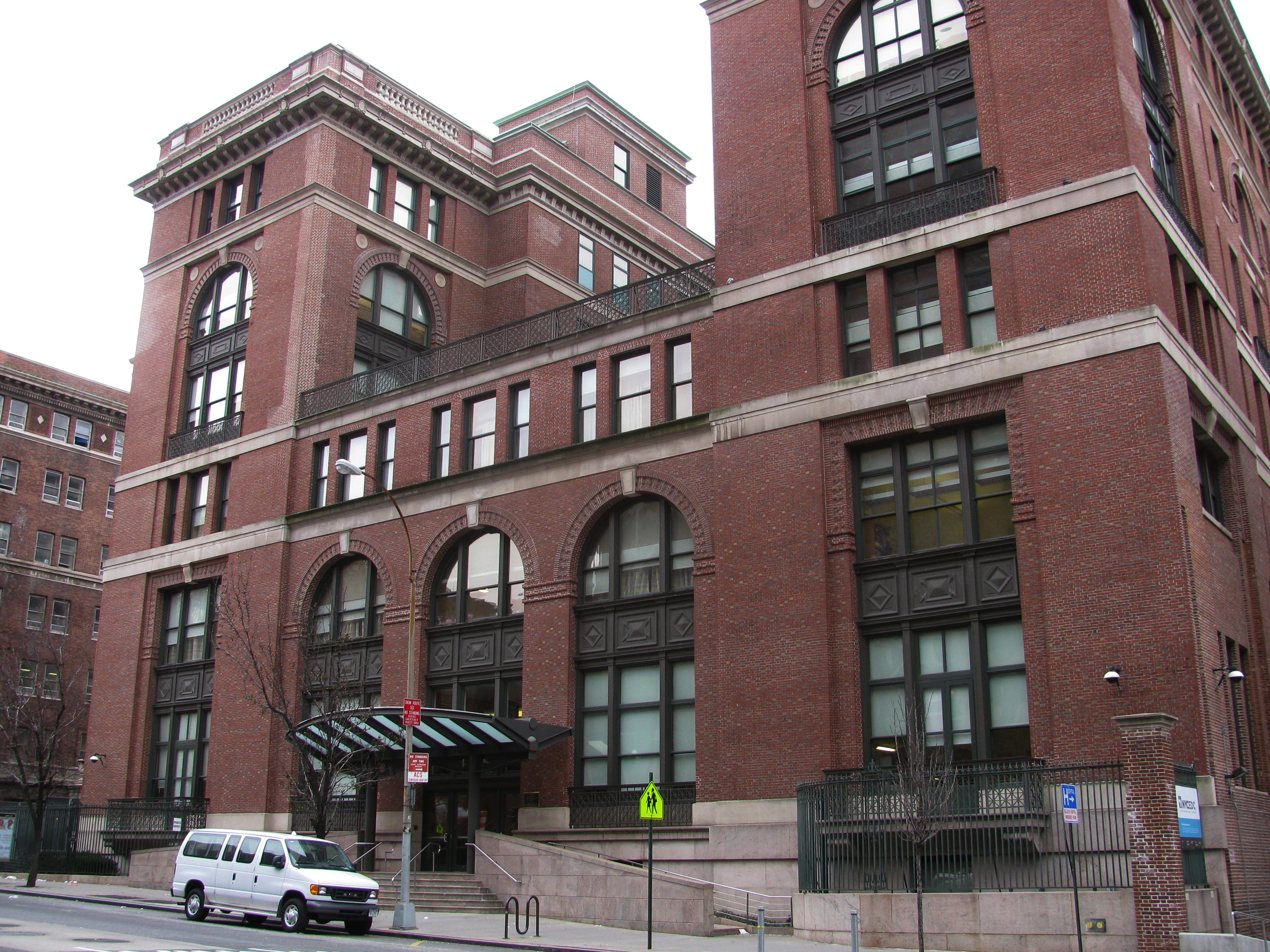
The First Avenue entrance to the building in 2009

In 1997, the New York City Administration for Children's Services (ACS) hired a design consultant and began making plans to develop the R & S Building into an emergency children's shelter. The ACS did not notify the local Manhattan Community Board 6 of the change, as was required under the city's Uniform Land Use Review Procedure law, prompting community board members to censure the city government. The building underwent a $67 million renovation by Richard Dattner Architects, including a restoration of its exterior and a complete reconstruction of its interior, and opened on June 1, 2001. The new interior contains an auditorium, offices, and conference center on the main floor, children's accommodations on the second and third floors, and training facilities for ACS staff on the fourth through sixth floors. The lobby of the renovated building included Song for a Child, a 4-by-40-foot (1.2 m × 12.2 m) mural by artist Tomie Arai based on the children's lullaby written by Chris Iijima. On November 7, 2013, the building was rededicated as the Nicholas Scoppetta Children's Center in honor of Nicholas Scoppetta, who led the effort to create the new children's center when he served as ACS' first commissioner. The facility is used as an intake center for children entering foster care.

== Architecture ==
The exterior of the building was designed in the Italian Renaissance style—employing characteristics such as a symmetrical plan, a central loggia formed by three tall arches, and a rooftop balustrade—with adaptions made to meet the functional needs of the hospital. While the ground floor of the building is rectangular in shape, the upper floors employ a U-plan design with an open light court facing First Avenue. The building's facade contains three string courses of limestone blocks and a terra-cotta cornice; it also has double-tiered window groups located below brick arches topped with limestone keystones. A former doorway on the south side of the building, which was originally intended to be the main entrance, is surrounded by Doric molding and topped by a pediment supported on brackets; this doorway was previously reached by a flight of stairs. The interior of the building contains Guastavino tile vaulted ceilings.

== See also ==
- National Register of Historic Places listings in Manhattan from 14th to 59th Streets
