= The St. George =

Hotel in Manhattan, New York

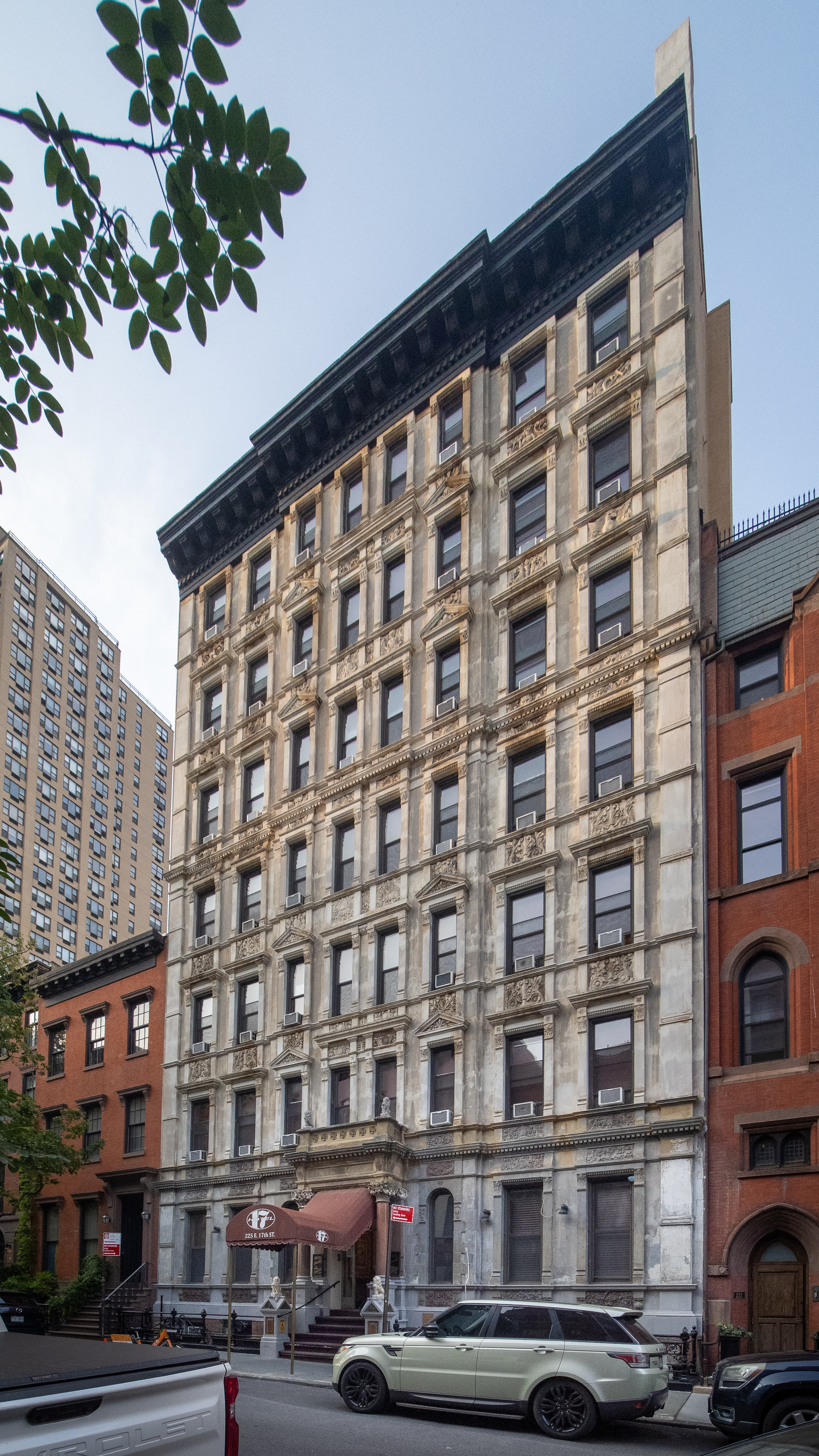
- (2025)
- Interactive map of the The St. George area

General information
- Type: Hotel; formerly residential
- Location: 223–225 E 17th Street, New York, New York, 10003, United States
- Coordinates: 40°44′5.5″N 73°59′4.5″W
- Completed: 1883
- Cost: $195,000 (over $4 million today)

Design and construction
- Architect: Thomas Osborne

The St. George or The St. George Residence, now functioning under the name of Hotel 17 is a historic building located at 223–225 East 17th Street, on Stuyvesant Square in Manhattan, New York City. It was designated as part of the Stuyvesant Square Historic District, a New York City landmark district, in 1975.

== History ==
The seven-story building was built on a vacant land in 1883 by Thomas Osborne as an apartment house called "the St. George" (also the St. George Residence, and the St. George Flats) and it was distinguished by its classically inspired, richly carved stone ornaments. Most notable is the influence of the French Renaissance on the ornament, which was quite unusual for that time. The marvelously expressive ornaments consist of figures, faces, animals and foliage. It was an elevator building with two spacious apartments on each floor. There were 8 rooms to each apartment and rents ranged from $1,300 to $1,800 a year; that would make $3,300 per month today.

On October 6, 1883, right after building's completion, Osborne sold the St. George to real estate investor and wealthy clothing merchant William R. H. Martin for $200,000. On April 7, 1884, around 11am, the building was nearly destroyed by fire, the flames causing over $160,000 in damage. This was the first rescue operation by the New York City Fire Department using the scaling ladder.

In the 1930s the apartments were converted to furnished rooms and the building is now a single room occupancy hotel. Currently hotel has 120 rooms. Building's fame also appeared in the 1993 Woody Allen film Manhattan Murder Mystery and was the site for photo shoots for Maxwell, David Bowie, and also Madonna's book Sex. Hotel was and continues to be popular among young actors, designers, models, punk and rock musicians who stay there.

== Notable residents ==
- Edward Sandford Martin, American journalist and editor.
- Charles Henry Tompkins, American general during the American Civil War.
- Thomas Ewing Jr., American general during the American Civil War.
- Margaret McDonald Bottome, American reformer and author.
- Amanda Lepore, American model, singer, and performance artist.
- Leigh Bowery, Australian performance artist and fashion designer.
- Madonna, American singer-songwriter and actress.
- David Lee Roth, American rock singer.
- Alice Cooper, American rock singer.

== See also ==
- The Jane, hotel in the West Village, Manhattan
- The Chelsea, hotel in Chelsea, Manhattan

== Bibliography ==
- New York City Landmarks Preservation Commission (1975) Stuyvesant Square Historic District Designation Report LPC-0893
