= 326, 328, and 330 East 18th Street =

Houses in Manhattan, New York

- Houses at 326, 328 and 330 East 18th Street
- U.S. National Register of Historic Places
- New York State Register of Historic Places
- New York City Landmark
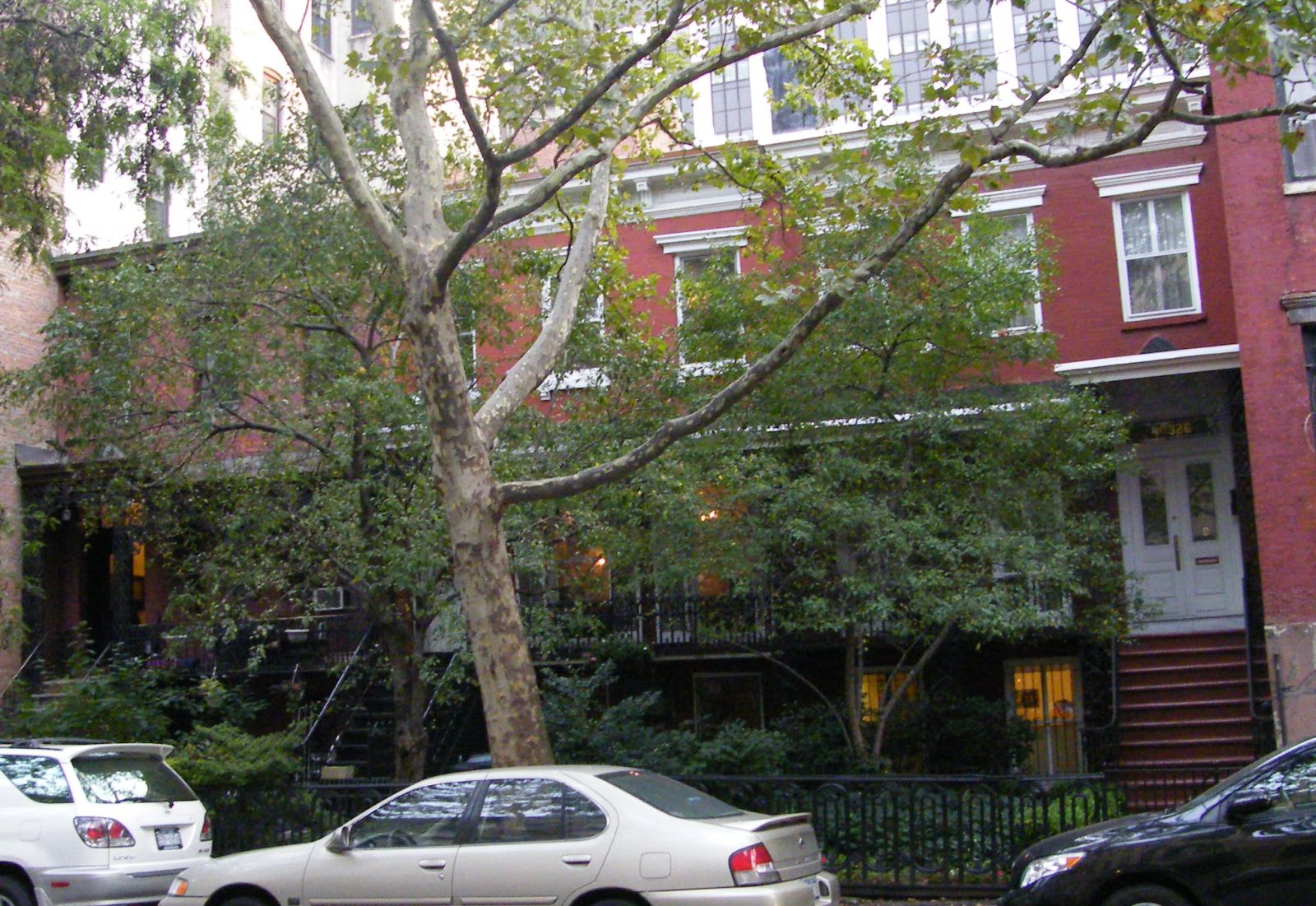

- Location within Manhattan
- Location: 326–330 E. 18th St., New York, New York
- Coordinates: 40°44′03″N 73°58′57″W
- Area: less than one acre
- Built: 1852
- Architectural style: Italianate
- NRHP reference No.: 82003380
- NYSRHP No.: 06101.002479, 06101.002480, 06101.002481
- NYCL No.: 0698, 0699, 0700

Significant dates
- Added to NRHP: 1982-09-30
- Designated NYSRHP: 1982-08-23
- Designated NYCL: 1973-03-22

326, 328, and 330 East 18th Street are a group of three houses in the Stuyvesant Square neighborhood of Manhattan in New York City, New York, US. Designed in the Italianate style, the buildings date from 1852–1853 and were all built on what was formerly the Stuyvesant Farm. Although the buildings' architects are unknown, the builder John Edwards and the stonecutter Henry Wilson are both known to have been involved in the buildings' construction, and Wilson lived in 326 East 18th Street for several years. The buildings are New York City designated landmarks and are on the National Register of Historic Places.

== Description ==
The houses are on the southern sidewalk of 18th Street, midblock between Second Avenue and First Avenue, in the Stuyvesant Square neighborhood of Manhattan in New York City, New York, US. All three buildings have facades made of brick and are designed in the Italianate style. There are large front yards in front of each house, which contain various types of greenery. The ground floor of each house is clad in brownstone, and a stoop ascends from street level to each of the houses' second-floor parlors. All three houses have party walls that adjoin each other and the neighboring buildings; as such, the rear facades cannot be seen from the street. Railings around 328 East 18th Street, the center house, separate it from the street and from the other buildings' yards. Number 326 abuts another house to the west, while number 330 abuts an apartment building to the east.

326 East 18th Street, the westernmost house, retains most of its original decorations, except for its cast-iron stoop. The stoop, which has since been rebuilt as a masonry staircase, ascends to a doorway under a canopy with French doors. 328 East 18th Street, the center house, is nearly symmetrically designed to number 326 but has a cast-iron stoop with open vertical risers; it is the only one of the three with its original stoop intact. The canopies above the entrances of both 326 and 328 East 18th Street are slightly higher than the veranda shared by the two houses. The canopies and verandas of the two houses have concave designs with trellises, and there is an elaborate ironwork handrail decorated in the Italianate style, with arch motifs. There are double-hung windows on the second floor of number 328, which were added after the building's construction. The cornice above the third floor of both buildings consists of three pairs of brackets, each of which flank a horizontal panel.

330 East 18th Street is not symmetrical to either of the houses to its west, and the fence in front has been replaced with iron bars. The main entrance and the stoop are narrower, and the stoop is clad in stucco. The arched panels in the handrail have simple quatrefoil designs. Number 330 has a concave entrance canopy that is higher than the concave veranda adjoining it; the veranda has a trellis that is similar in design to those at numbers 326 and 328. The windows on the second level are enlarged compared with the original design, and there are sawtooth-shaped cornices above the windows. The cornice above the top story is also different from that in the other two houses. There are six brackets in number 330's cornice, which flank five panels; the middle panel has a lion's head motif, while the other panels have rosettes.

== History ==
The entire site was formerly part of the Stuyvesant Farm, the estate of Peter Stuyvesant, the last Dutch director-general of the colony of New Netherland. The city block was developed starting in 1847, but development generally proceeded east from First Avenue and west from Second Avenue, leaving the middle of the block empty. Five men from the Youngs and Edwards families leased three midblock sites at 326–330 East 18th Street in March 1852. Stuyvesant's descendant Cornelia Stuyvesant Ten Broeck, who remained the site owner, required the Youngs and Edwards families to construct three stone or brick houses on these sites, as a condition of the lease. The first two houses to be built were numbers 328 and 330, which were finished later in 1852. The third house, number 326, was completed in 1853; it was originally the residence of the stonecutter Henry Wilson, who was involved in the construction.

Emily S. Kilian owned number 330 for more than five decades starting in the mid-1890s, and Anna Bickman (sometimes spelled Beckman or Bickmann) acquired number 328 in 1920. Number 326 was resold in 1942 to LLP Realty Corp. Number 330 served as a boardinghouse in the 20th century; it was sold in 1945 to real-estate developer Nathan Wilson, who resold the property that year to Jacob Levin. The Bickman family sold number 328 to the Jacobson family in 1958. The New York City Landmarks Preservation Commission designated the houses as landmarks on March 22, 1973. The buildings were added to the National Register of Historic Places as a single listing on September 30, 1982; according to the National Register listing, the houses were among the few surviving mid-19th century houses in the area that retained their cast-iron decorations. Number 330 was renovated and converted back to a private residence in the late 20th century.

== See also ==
- National Register of Historic Places in Manhattan from 14th to 59th Streets
- List of New York City Designated Landmarks in Manhattan from 14th to 59th Streets
