= Stuyvesant Square =

Public park and neighborhood in Manhattan, New York

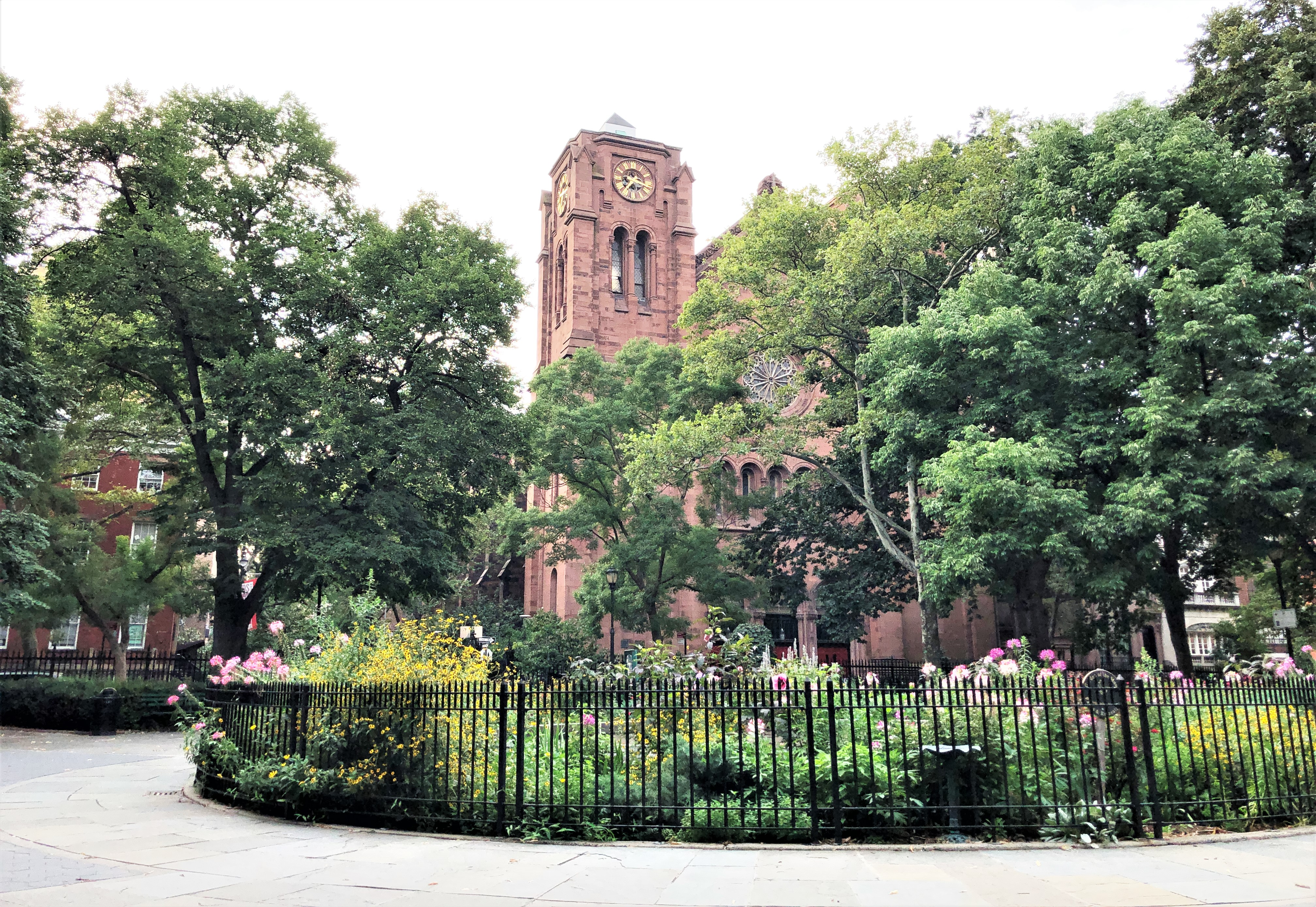
- The central fountain in the western portion of the park; the park is bisected by Second Avenue. In the background is St. George's Episcopal Church
- Interactive map of Stuyvesant Square
- Location: Between 15th Street, 17th Street, Rutherford Place, and Nathan D. Perlman Place, Manhattan, New York City
- Coordinates: 40°44′01″N 73°59′02″W
- Stuyvesant Square Historic District
- U.S. National Register of Historic Places
- U.S. Historic district
- New York State Register of Historic Places
- New York City Landmark
- Location within Manhattan Location within New York City Location within New York
- Location: Roughly bounded by Nathan D. Perleman Pl., 3rd Ave., E. 18th and E. 15th Sts., New York, New York
- Coordinates: 40°44′02″N 73°59′06″W
- Area: 9 acres (3.6 ha)
- Built: 1836
- Architect: Richard Morris Hunt, et al.
- Architectural style: Greek Revival, Italianate, Romanesque
- NRHP reference No.: 80002723
- NYCL No.: 0893

Significant dates
- Added to NRHP: November 21, 1980
- Designated NYSRHP: February 28, 1980
- Designated NYCL: September 23, 1975

Stuyvesant Square is the name of both a park and its surrounding neighborhood in the New York City borough of Manhattan. The park is located between 15th Street, 17th Street, Rutherford Place, and Nathan D. Perlman Place (formerly Livingston Place) in the Gramercy Park neighborhood. Second Avenue divides the park into two halves, east and west, and each half is surrounded by the original cast-iron fence.

The neighborhood is roughly bounded by 14th Street to the south, 18th or 19th Street to the north, First Avenue to the east, and Third Avenue to the west. It is part of Manhattan Community Board 6.

== Geography ==
Manhattan Community Board 6 does not mark neighborhood boundaries on its map, but centers "Stuyvesant Park" in the area south of 20th Street, north of 14th Street, east of Third Avenue, and west of First Avenue. In city documents, New York City census tract 48.97 (later known as tract 48) has been used as an approximation for Stuyvesant Park. To the east of the neighborhood is Stuyvesant Town, to the west is the Union Square area, and to the south is the East Village.

For its entry on "Stuyvesant Square and North," the American Institute of Architects' AIA Guide to New York City uses the area east of Third Avenue, from 14th Street to 23rd Street.

== History ==
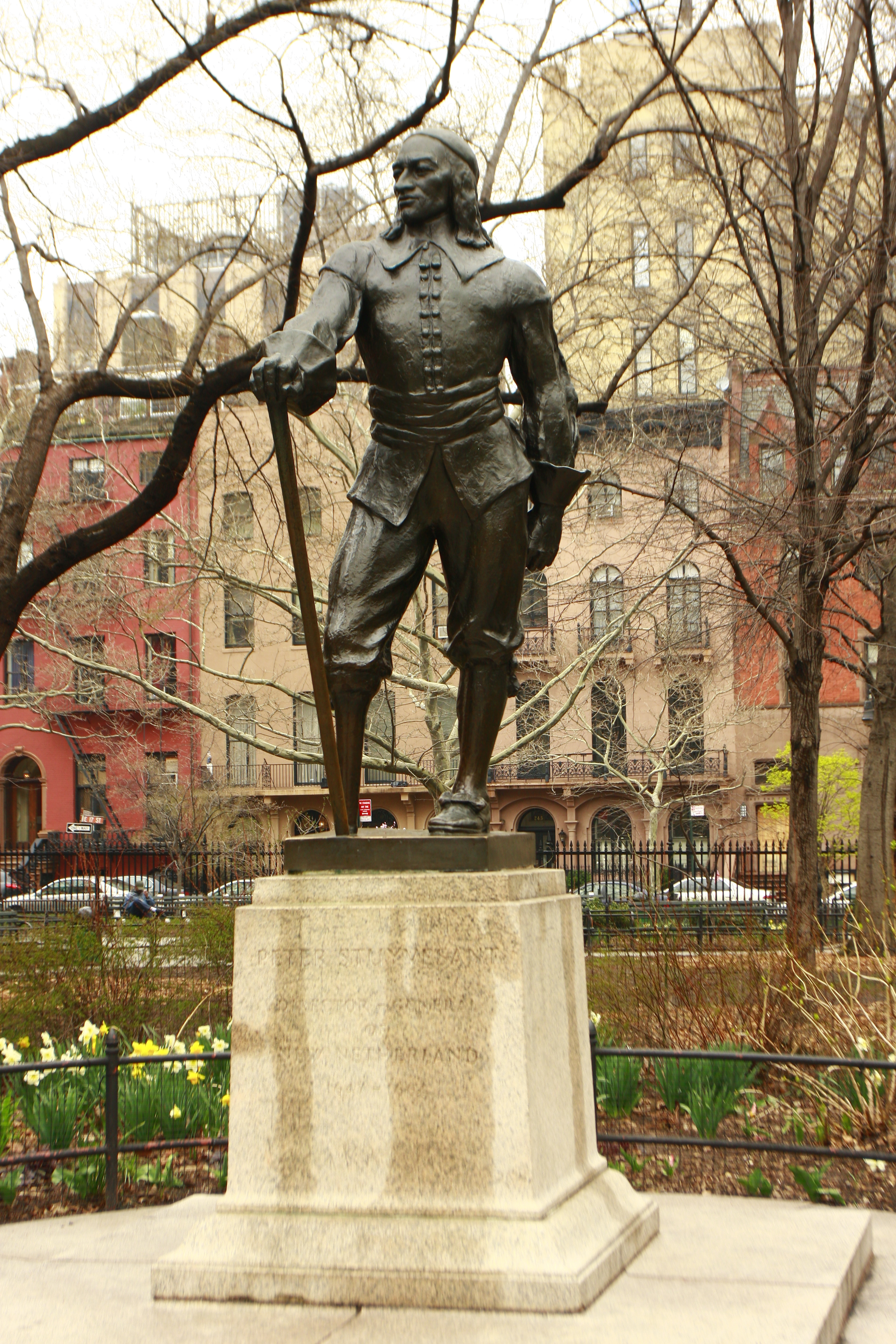
Gertrude Vanderbilt Whitney's statue of Peter Stuyvesant in the western half of the park

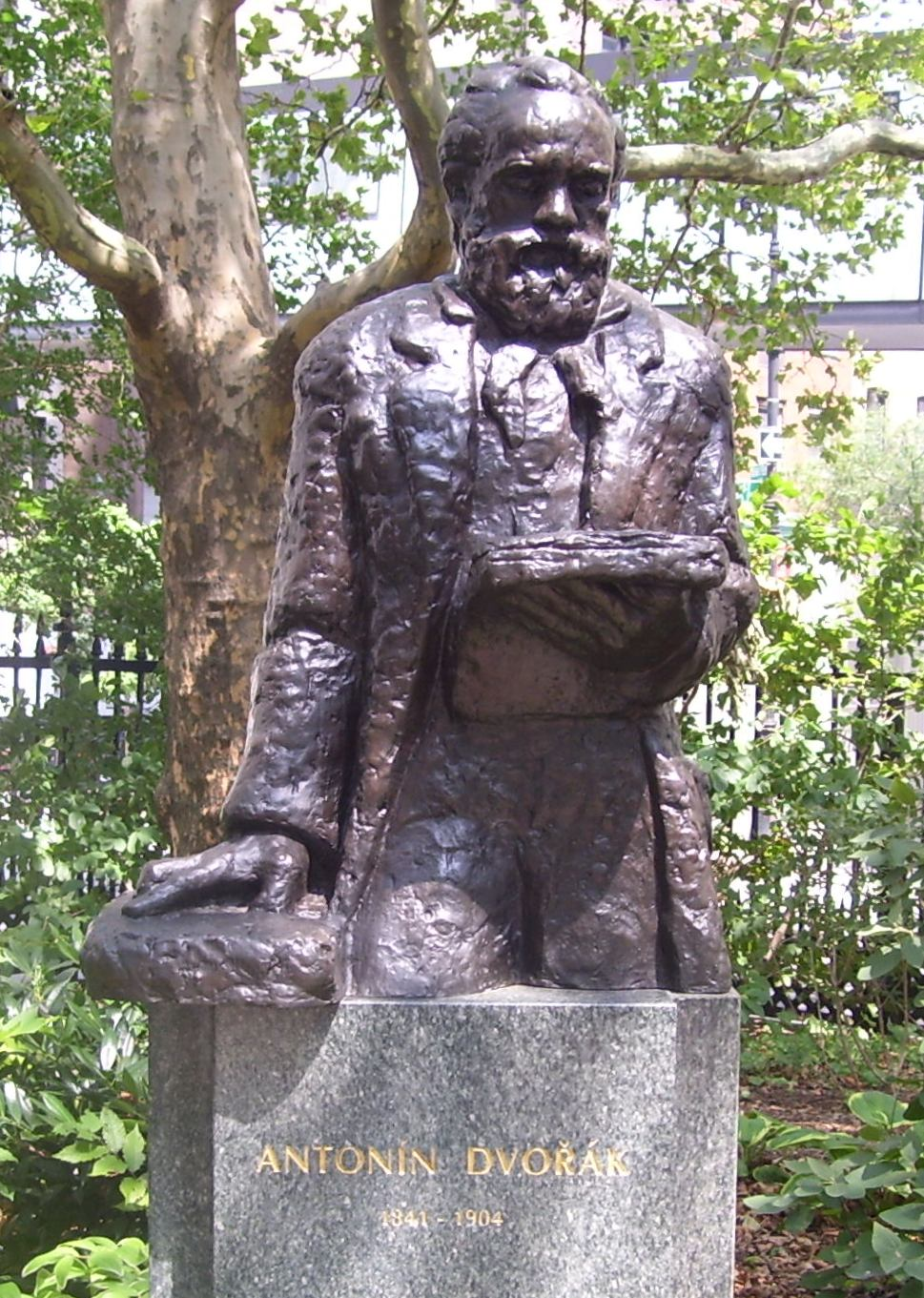
Statue of Antonín Dvořák in the eastern half, not far from the site of his house

In 1836, Peter Gerard Stuyvesant (1778–1847) – the great-great-grandson of Peter Stuyvesant – and his wife Helen (or Helena) Rutherfurd reserved four acres of the Stuyvesant farm and sold it for a token five dollars to the City of New York as a public park, originally to be called Holland Square, with the proviso that the City of New York build a fence around it. As time passed, however, no fence was constructed, and in 1839, Stuyvesant's family sued the City to cause it to enclose the land. Not until 1847 did the City begin to improve the park by erecting the magnificent, 2800 foot long cast-iron fence, which still stands as the oldest cast-iron fence in New York City. (The oldest fence in New York is that around Bowling Green.) In 1850 two fountains completed the landscaping, and the park was formally opened to the public. The public space joined St. John's Square (no longer extant), the recently formed Washington Square and the private Gramercy Park as residential squares around which it was expected New York's better neighborhoods would be built.

In the early 1900s, Stuyvesant Square was among the city's most fashionable addresses. The Stuyvesant Building, at 17 Livingston Place on the eastern edge of the square, was home to the publisher George Putnam, Harper's Bazaar editor Elizabeth Jordan and Elizabeth Custer, the widow of General George Armstrong Custer.

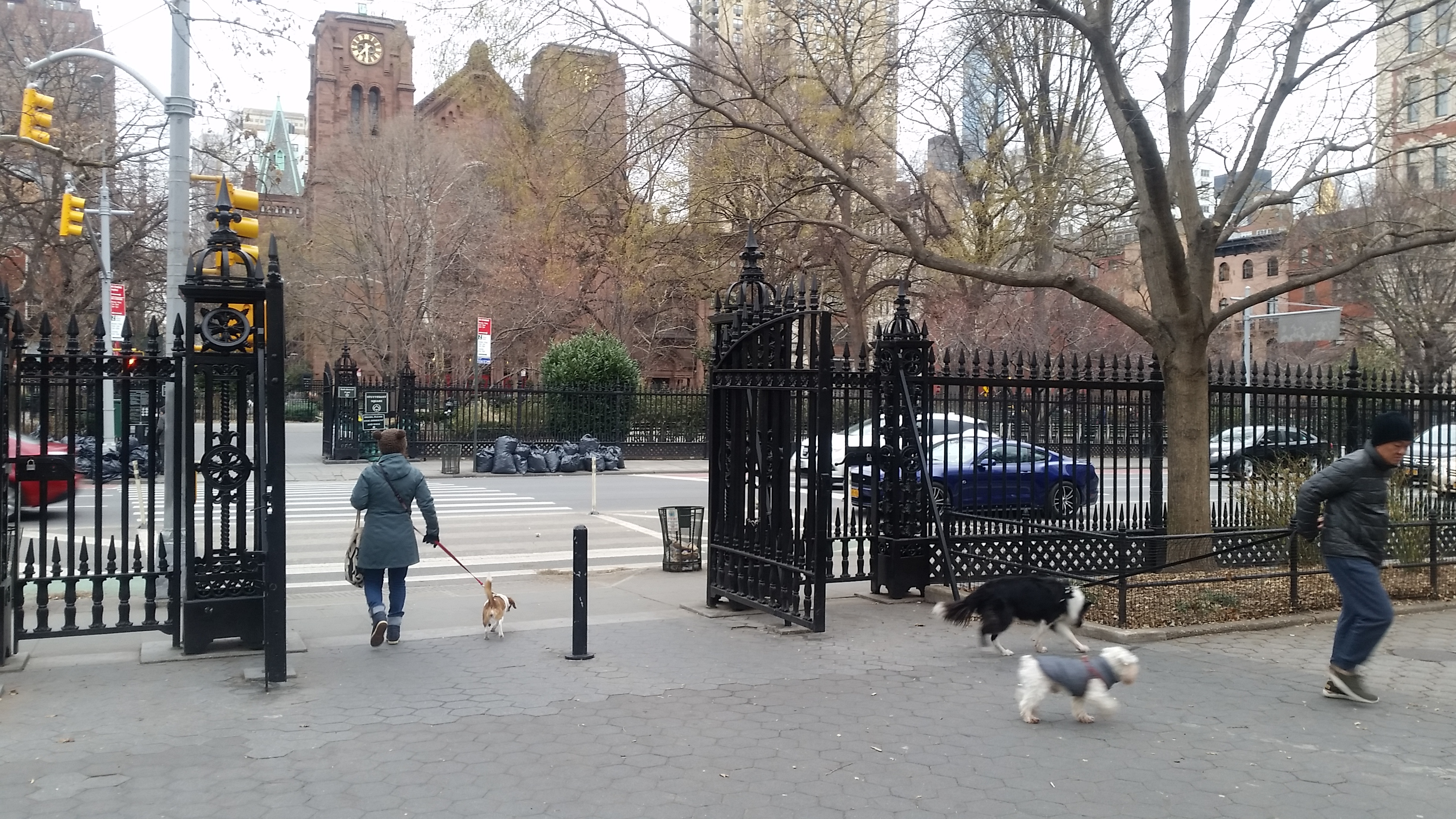
Part of the iron fence facing Second Avenue, with St. George's in the background

The opening of St. George's Church, located on Rutherford Place and 16th Street (built on land obtained from Peter Stuyvesant, 1848–1856; burnt down in 1865; remodeled by C.O.Blesch and L. Eidlitz, 1897) and the Friends Meeting House and Seminary (to the southwest) (1861, Charles Bunting) attracted more residents to the area around the park. The earliest existing houses in the district, in the Greek Revival style, date to 1842–43, when the city's residential development was first moving north of 14th Street, but the major growth in the area occurred in the 1850s. Fashionable houses were still being built as late as 1883, when Richard Morris Hunt's Sidney Webster House at 245 East 17th Street – now the East End Temple synagogue – was completed, but already German and Irish immigrants, had begun moving into new rowhouses and brownstones in the neighborhood, followed by Jewish, Italian and Slavic immigrants.

Other than Beth Israel, other hospitals were located in the neighborhood as well. The New York Infirmary for Women and Children was founded at 321 East 15th Street by the pioneering woman physician, Dr. Elizabeth Blackwell. The New York Lying-In Hospital on Second Avenue at 17th Street, is now condominiums, but the Hospital for Joint Diseases, a unit of NYU Medical Center is located across the avenue. Other now non-existent hospitals included the Salvation Army's William Booth Memorial Hospital, Manhattan General, and St. Andrew's Convalescent Hospital. Because of the number of hospitals in the district, there were many doctor's offices on the side streets, along with quacks and midwives who preyed upon the area's immigrant population.

== Park ==
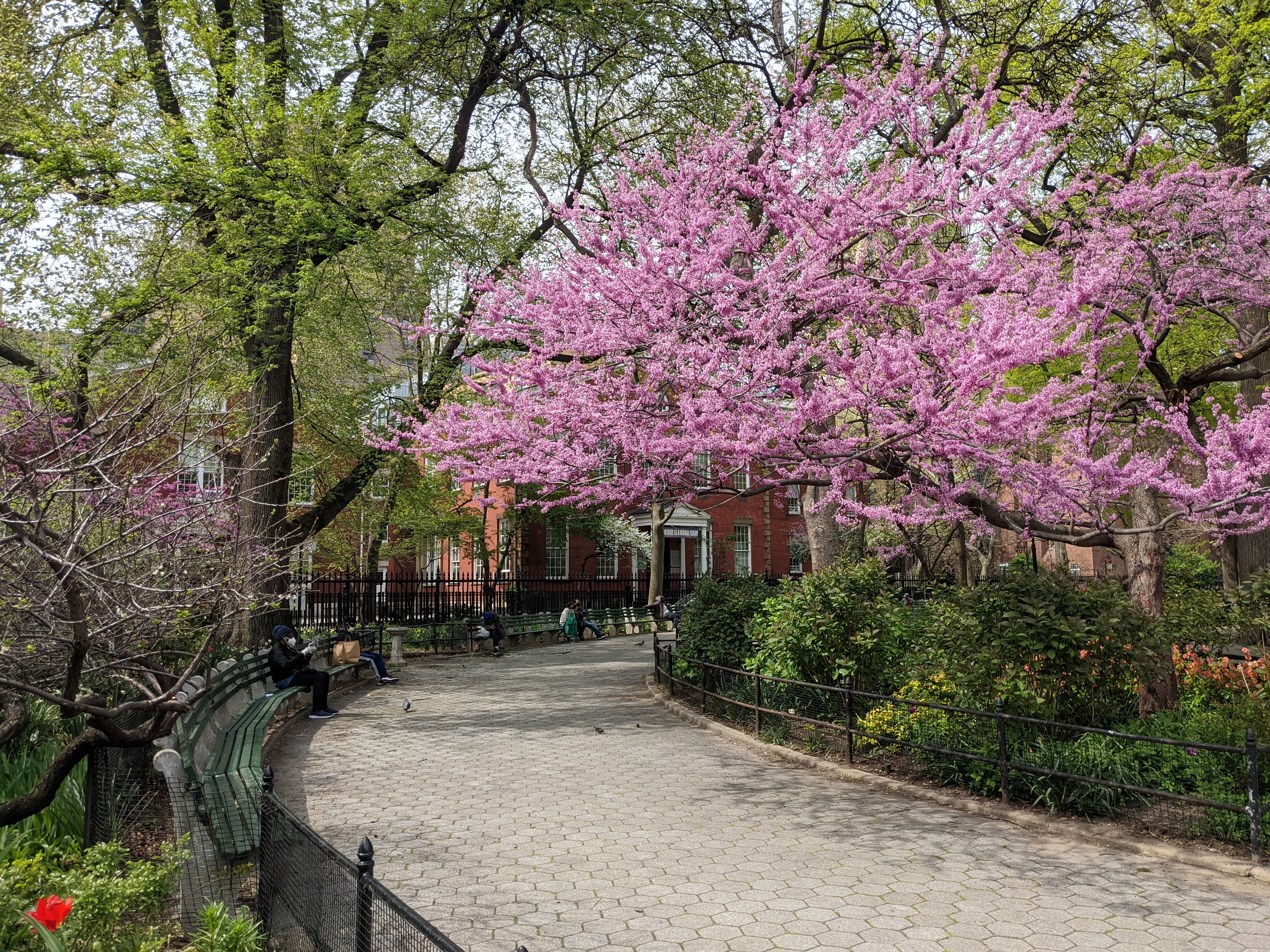
A walkway in the park in the spring

Stuyvesant Square Park, like many other city parks, was extensively rehabilitated in a more populist manner during the 1930s, when the 19th-century plan was modified by Parks Commissioner Robert Moses' landscape architect Gilmore D. Clarke, with the addition of comfort stations, playgrounds and other built amenities. The park reopened in 1937; the 1980s saw restorations of the two 1884 fountains, the preservation of the cast-iron fence, and relaying the original bluestone sidewalks in two ellipses, with renovated lawns, shrubs and flower beds. A few old trees, English elm and Little-leaf linden, still flourish. Further contributions to the park have included Gertrude Vanderbilt Whitney's Peter Stuyvesant (1941) and Ivan Mestorvic's Antonín Dvořák (1963, moved here 1997).

The park is operated and maintained by the New York City Department of Parks and Recreation. It recently completed the fencing and sidewalk reconstruction around the eastern half of the park. It is currently renovating the public bathroom in the same half of the park. The Stuyvesant Park Neighborhood Association works on behalf of park patrons in the surrounding neighborhoods to preserve the park's historic beauty and sponsor temporary art installations, like Judith Modrak's Nurturing Tree (through October 2026).

== Surrounding area ==
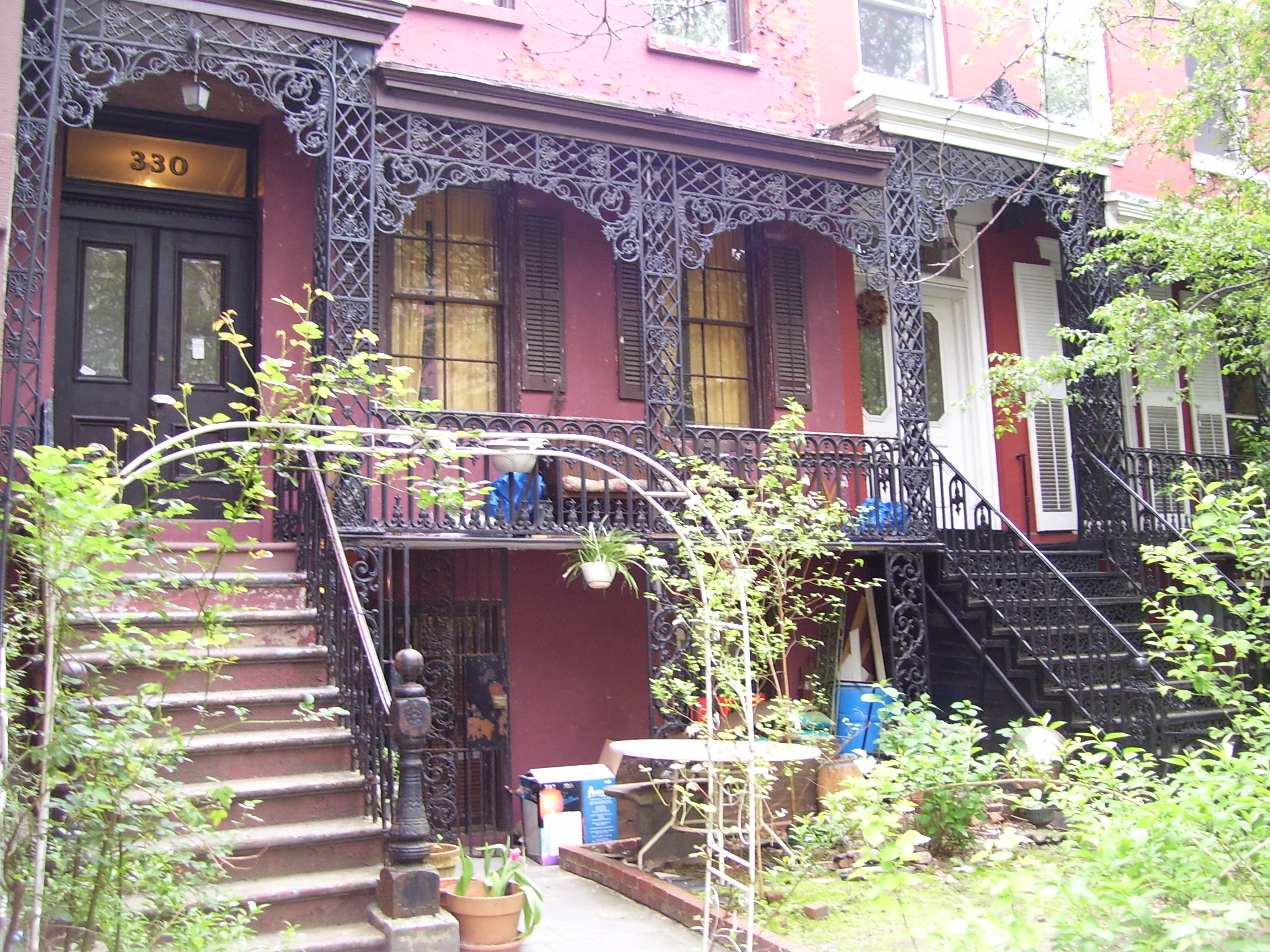
Landmarked row houses at 326, 328, and 330 East 18th Street in Stuyvesant Square

Directly around the square, in the eponymous neighborhood, are the Friends Meeting House and Seminary and St. George's Episcopal Church – once attended by J.P. Morgan – both on Rutherford Place. On the eastern side is Beth Israel Medical Center (closed in 2025) – part of which, the Robert Mapplethorpe Residential Treatment Facility for AIDS patients, was built on the site of Bohemian composer Antonín Dvořák's 1893 home at 327 East 17th Street. Hotel 17, formerly a residential building called the St. George, is on the northwestern corner of the square at 223–225 East 17th Street. Nearby, within the neighborhood, is the old Stuyvesant High School building, still in educational use as the "Old Stuyvesant Campus".

The square and its immediate environs were designated the Stuyvesant Square Historic District in 1975. The Friends Meeting House, St. George's and Stuyvesant High School are all New York City landmarks, designated in 1967, 1969 and 1997, respectively, as are the three Italianate brick row houses with deep front yards and cast iron verandas at 326, 328, and 330 East 18th Street, built in 1852–1853 at the instigation of Cornelia Stuyvesant Ten Broeck.

== See also ==
- Gramercy Park
- East 17th Street/Irving Place Historic District
- East Village, Manhattan
- Stuyvesant Town–Peter Cooper Village
