= Asian Women Giving Circle =

U.S. philanthropic organization

- Abbreviation: AWGC
- Formation: 2005
- Founder: Hali Lee
- Type: Philanthropic Giving Circle
- Purpose: To financially support arts and cultural transformation focusing on the efforts of Asian women in New York.
- Website: asianwomengivingcircle.org

The Asian Women Giving Circle (AWGC) is a philanthropic organization founded in 2005 and led by Asian women. It is a donor-advised fund of the Ms. Foundation for Women. The giving circle consists of Asian women in New York who put monetary resources together in order to invest in various projects. They give support to artistic and cultural projects led by women in New York City which are designed to enact social transformation, raise awareness of critical issues pertaining to Asian American females and to promote women's roles as creators, leaders and managers. On average, the two dozen or so members each raises about $2,500 every year to be donated to the pool of resources the giving circle uses in order to support various projects. The founder, Hali Lee, stresses that it is important for members to learn to raise money, because by learning to raise money, members gain an important skill set. The AWGC is formally organized, soliciting proposals for grants and allowing members of the group to vote on the recipients of the money.

== History ==
AWGC was founded by Lee in 2005. Lisa Philp, who is also head of philanthropic services at J. P. Morgan, helped create AWGC. At the time, the group was one of "very few Asian American philanthropic groups and the only pan-Asian, all-women philanthropic group in the nation." After only two years of operation, the members of the AWGC raised $130,000 for projects in New York City. In 2014, AWGC had supported sixty-four different projects and awarded over $550,000 in grant money.

== Projects ==
AWGC funds projects from applicants who work within New York city only and who have non-profit status. Generally, there is one grants cycle every year with a requests for proposals (RFP) being released in January. Winners of grants money are announced in June.
