= Nariné Simonian =

- Also known as: Nariné
- Born: 1965 (age 60–61); Gyumri, Armenia
- Genre: Baroque
- Occupations: Musician, musical director and producer
- Instruments: Organ, piano

Nariné Simonian (sometimes written only as Nariné, born 1965 in Gyumri, Armenia) is an Armenian-born French organist, pianist, musical director, and producer of operas. She specializes in baroque music, with a strong emphasis on Johann Sebastian Bach.

== Biography ==
Born in the city of Gyumri, in 1965, Simonian started studying piano at the age of six years. In 1976, she was admitted to the Normal School of Music, where she graduated and was awarded the gold medal in 1980. From 1981 to 1985, Simonian followed the Curriculum of the National School of Music of Yerevan, where she graduated as a professional concert pianist (first prize, unanimously awarded) and soloist of chamber music ensemble. She also graduated as a professional concert organist and was, again, awarded the first prize unanimously, in 1989. From 1989 to 1991, she was a soloist at the Philharmonic Hall of Yerevan, Armenia and gave concerts and masterclasses in Moscow, Tallinn, and Helsinki, among others.

In 1991, she decided to take classes in France, under the direction of French organists Marie-Claire Alain, Huguette Dreyfus and Andre Isoir. She was awarded the First Prize for organ unanimously at the CNR of Rueil-Malmaison, class of Marie-Claire Alain (1993) and received the First Prize unanimously at the national competition of Organ in the Paris area, in 1995 (Ile-de-France). In 1994, she received the Citation of Excellence in the competition for excellence in organ CNR of Rueil-Malmaison, class of Marie-Claire Alain, and the Award of Excellence (mention virtuosity) in organ at the CNR of Rueil-Malmaison, class of Susan Landale (1995). She also won the Grand Prize Contest International Mendelssohn-Liszt in Switzerland in 1994. Since 2009, she has also been advised by Andre Isoir.

President of the French nonprofit Association "Les Amis de Gumri.France" ("Friends of Gyumri"), Simonian spearheads an effort to raise enough money to set up an organ in her native city of Gyumri.

== Concerts ==
Simonian has given many concerts throughout France, including at the Église Saint-Jean-de-Malte in Aix-en-Provence, the Abbey of La Prée, and Notre-Dame of Valence, as well as the Paris churches Notre-Dame de Paris, La Madeleine, Saint-Eustache, Saint-Roch Armenian church of Paris, the Saint-Germain-des-Prés church in November 2008, and Issy-les-Moulineaux. She has also given concerts in Russia, Belgium, Switzerland (in Bulle, at Saint-Pierre des Liens) where she has a recorded an album, in Finland, in Kyiv (Ukraine in 2003 with Dominique de Williencourt and in November 2008 at the Organ Hall), in North America (New York on 1 November 1998, at the Armenian Evangelical Church of New York, in Montreal and in South America in 1997, along with Olivier Latry (Argentina, Uruguay at the Festival Internacional del Uruguay Órgano).

She then began to concentrate more on producing and directing baroque operas.

== World Premiere of the Organ Opera version of Gluck Iphigénie en Tauride ==
On 25 and 26 November 2009, at the Eglise Sainte-Croix in Paris, Simonian directed a production of Christoph Willibald Gluck's four-act opera Iphigénie en Tauride, transposed for organ. Accompanied by the Polish pianist Jozef Kapustka, Simonian directed and produced this opera, staged by choreographer Helene Haag, with the financial help of the Halmahera family holding. In the main roles: Russian soprano Irina Tiviane (Iphigenia), Canadian-Ukrainian tenor Sergei Stilmachenko (Orestes), Raphael Schwob (Pylades), French tenor Olivier Ayault (Thoas), French soprano Anne Rodier (Diane) and Iulia Vacaru (Female Greek). One of two premieres of this opera has been the subject of an audio recording and an album has been distributed. A video has also been shot by Dov B. Rueff, the documentary director, who works with the German-French Arte TV Channel.

== Recordings ==
- Mendelssohn, Liszt, Guillou, grandes orgues de Saint-Eustache (Paris), Sepm Quantum, Paris, 1996 (4 diapasons)
- Jean-Sébastien Bach, orgue Mooser de Saint-Pierre aux Liens (Bulle, Suisse), Sepm Quantum, Paris, 1997 (5 diapasons).
- Divine Liturgie et chants traditionnels arméniens, Sepm Quantum, Paris, 1998 (4 diapasons).
- Jean-Sébastien Bach, petits Préludes, Fugues, Suite anglaise n°6, Préliminaires au clavier ...tempéré, Sepm Quantum, Paris, 2000.
- Iphigenie en Tauride, Gluck, organ version with Jozef Kapustka, March 2010.
