= Rose Hill, Manhattan =

Neighborhood in Manhattan, New York City

Coordinates: 40.742°N 73.983°W

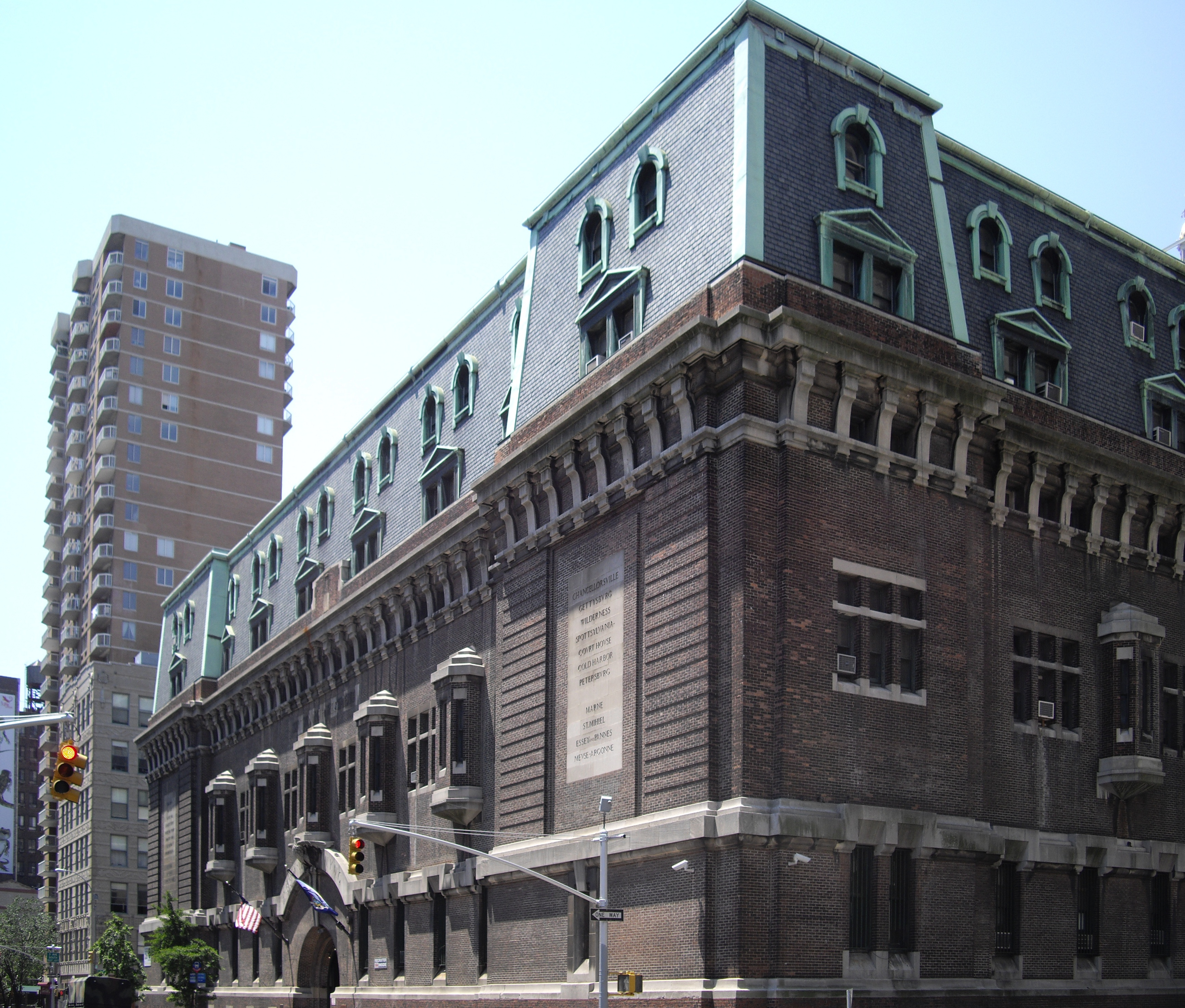
The 69th Regiment Armory on Lexington Avenue between 25th and 26th Streets

Location in New York City

Rose Hill is a neighborhood in the New York City borough of Manhattan, between the neighborhoods of Murray Hill to the north and Gramercy Park to the south, Kips Bay to the east, the Flatiron District to the southwest, and NoMad to the northwest. The formerly unnamed area is sometimes considered to be a part of NoMad, because the name "Rose Hill" was chiefly used for the area in the 18th and 19th centuries, and is not very commonly used to refer to the area in the 21st century.

The AIA Guide to New York City defines Rose Hill as the area bounded by 23rd Street to the south, 32nd Street to the north, Madison Avenue to the west, and Third Avenue to the east. The president of the Rose Hill Neighborhood Association considers the eastern boundary to be the East River. The Rose Hill neighborhood straddles Manhattan Community Districts 5 and 6.

== Rose Hill in the Bronx ==
The name of the Manhattan neighborhood is derived from a locale in the Bronx. Rose Hill Park is a vestige of a far larger estate once called "Rose Hill" by its owner, Robert Watts, and Rose Hill Campus is part of the site of Fordham University. According to the New York City Department of Parks, in 1775 Robert's brother John married his cousin Jane DeLancey, whose family lived on the adjacent property, which is now Bronx Park.

Prior to his marriage, John Watt had lived on his Manhattan properties. He purchased the Bronx property in 1787 from the estate of Andrew Corsa. Shortly afterward, John transferred the property to his brother Robert, who named it "Rose Hill".

Archival research by Roger Wines, professor of history at Fordham, has shown that the original owner of the manor was a Dutchman named Reyer Michaelson. Benjamin Corsa married Michaelson's daughter and was deeded the house and land in 1736. John Hughes, Roman Catholic Bishop of New York, purchased Rose Hill in 1839 as the future site of Fordham's forerunner, St. John's College.

== Rose Hill on the Watts Farm ==
=== Watts' ownership ===
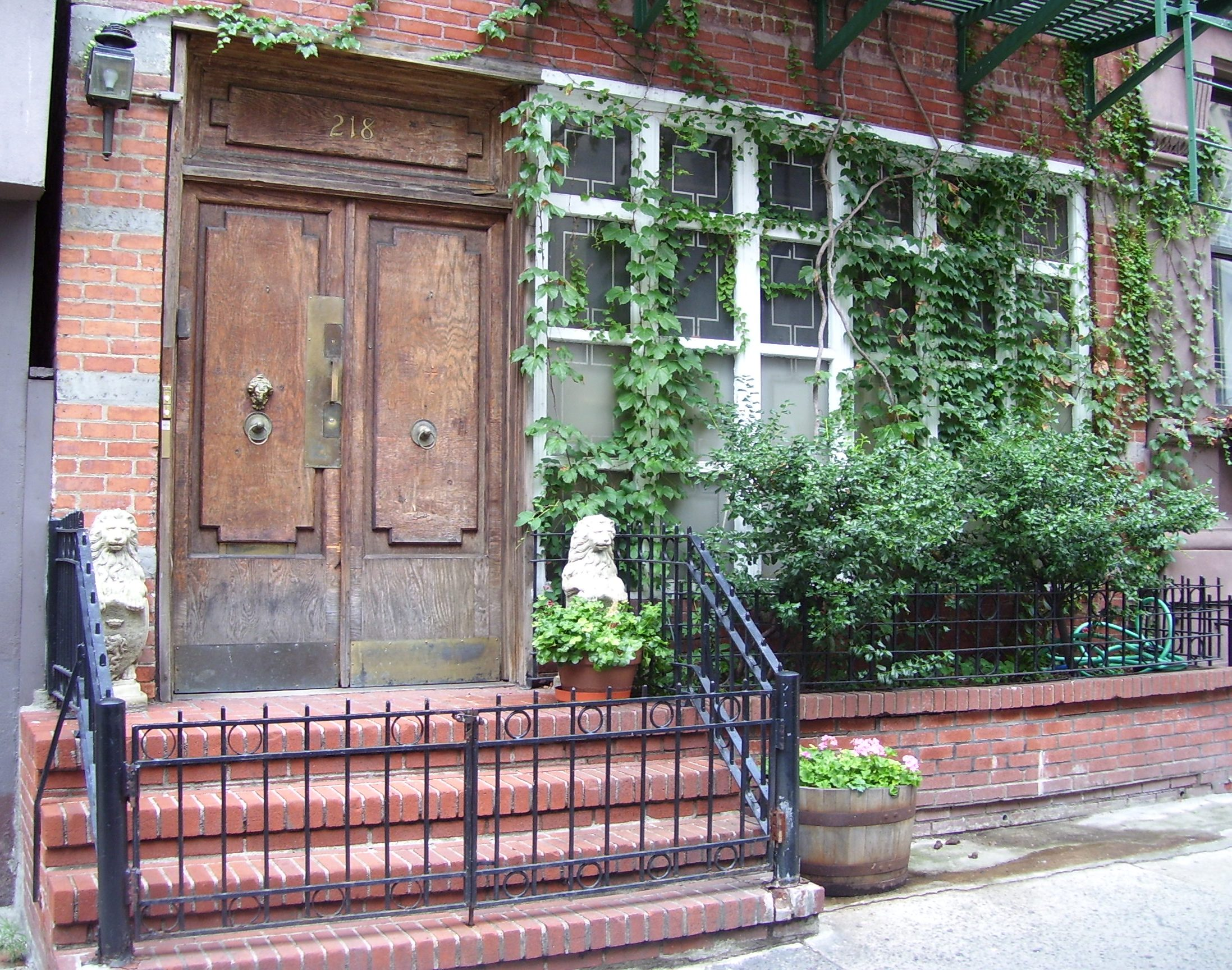
218 East 25th Street

According to a historical genealogical source, the first "Rose Hill" was the farm acquired from James DeLancey in November 1747 by the Hon. John Watts (1715–1789), who represented the city for many years in the Colonial Assembly. The farm contained over 130 acres (0.53 km^{2}) which lay on the East River between what were to become 21st and 30th streets and between the future Fourth Avenue and the water. Watts' residence in town was at 3 Broadway, facing Bowling Green.

Watts was the son of Robert Watts, of "Rose Hill", near Edinburgh, and Mary, eldest daughter of William Nicoll, of Islip, Long Island; John named the farm in commemoration of his father's house. In July 1742, John married Ann, youngest daughter of Stephen DeLancey. As Loyalists, they left for Britain in 1775 and never returned, leaving "Rose Hill" and the Broadway house in the hands of their son John Watts (1749—1836). John (2nd) received both houses outright in his father's will, proved September 12, 1789.

The main house at Rose Hill burned in 1779, during the British occupation, but a deed from the 1780s mentions "houses, buildings, orchards, gardens" on the land. Parts of Rose Hill Farm were being sold off in the 1780s: in 1786, Nicholas Cruger paid "144 pounds" for a lot at the north edge of the property, consisting of most of what is now the block bounded by 29th and 30th Streets and Second and Third Avenues.

=== Sale ===
Having been rebuilt and refurbished after the Revolutionary War, Rose Hill Farm was put up for sale in 1790. As Advertised in the New-York Daily Advertiser:

A Farm for Sale. That very elegant and pleasantly situated FARM, Rose Hill, lying on the banks of and adjoining the east river, three miles from this city, containing 92 acres of valuable land, in the highest cultivation, chiefly in mowing ground, the whole well inclosed, principally with stone fences of a superior construction, bounding on the public road 1175 feet; a pleasant avenue through the orchard in front of the house, also a good road that comes out into the bowery land, next to the honorable James Duane’s; on the premises there is an elegant dwelling house of 50 by 37 feet; a commodious farm house of 50 by 20 feet; an excellent barn with carriage houses and stable, 20 by 40 feet, a hovel with a large hay loft over the whole 96 by 15 feet, corn crib, fowl house &c. all the buildings are new and well finished in the most commodious manner, a fine bearing orchard of 260 engrafted apple trees of the most approved sorts, and a great variety of other kinds of the best English and American fruits, a thriving nursery of upwards of 9000 young fruit trees, numbers of which are inoculated and engrafted; an elegant garden, with the finest collection of flowers, flowering shrubs, strawberry, asparagus beds, etc. ten acres in wheat and rye:

The whole with all farming utensils, cattle, and stock of all kinds, will be sold, either together or separately; the buildings, with orchard, fruit trees, garden; etc. with as many acres of the land as may suit a purchaser, to whom the conditions will be made convenient, by a length of time for the payment. Apply on the premises, or at No. 5 Stone Street.

NB: If the above farm is not disposed of by the first of May, it will then be leased for a number of years. –Among the stock there is some valuable cattle imported from Holland, and a fine large breeding mare from England.

Revolutionary War General Horatio Gates acquired part or all of the Watts property in 1790 and established a country seat in a mansion at the present corner of Second Avenue and 22nd Street. He died at his estate in April 1806, whereupon his home became a boarding house.

The Cruger parcel was subdivided into building lots by the time the Commissioners' Plan of 1811 was adopted, establishing Manhattan's present street grid.

Just to the southwest corner of the "Rose Hill" property, Gramercy Park was laid out in 1831, on the axis of what became Lexington Avenue. The map made in 1866 by John Bute Holmes, of "Rose Hill Farm Gramercy Seat, and the estate of John Watts" is conserved in the New York Public Library.

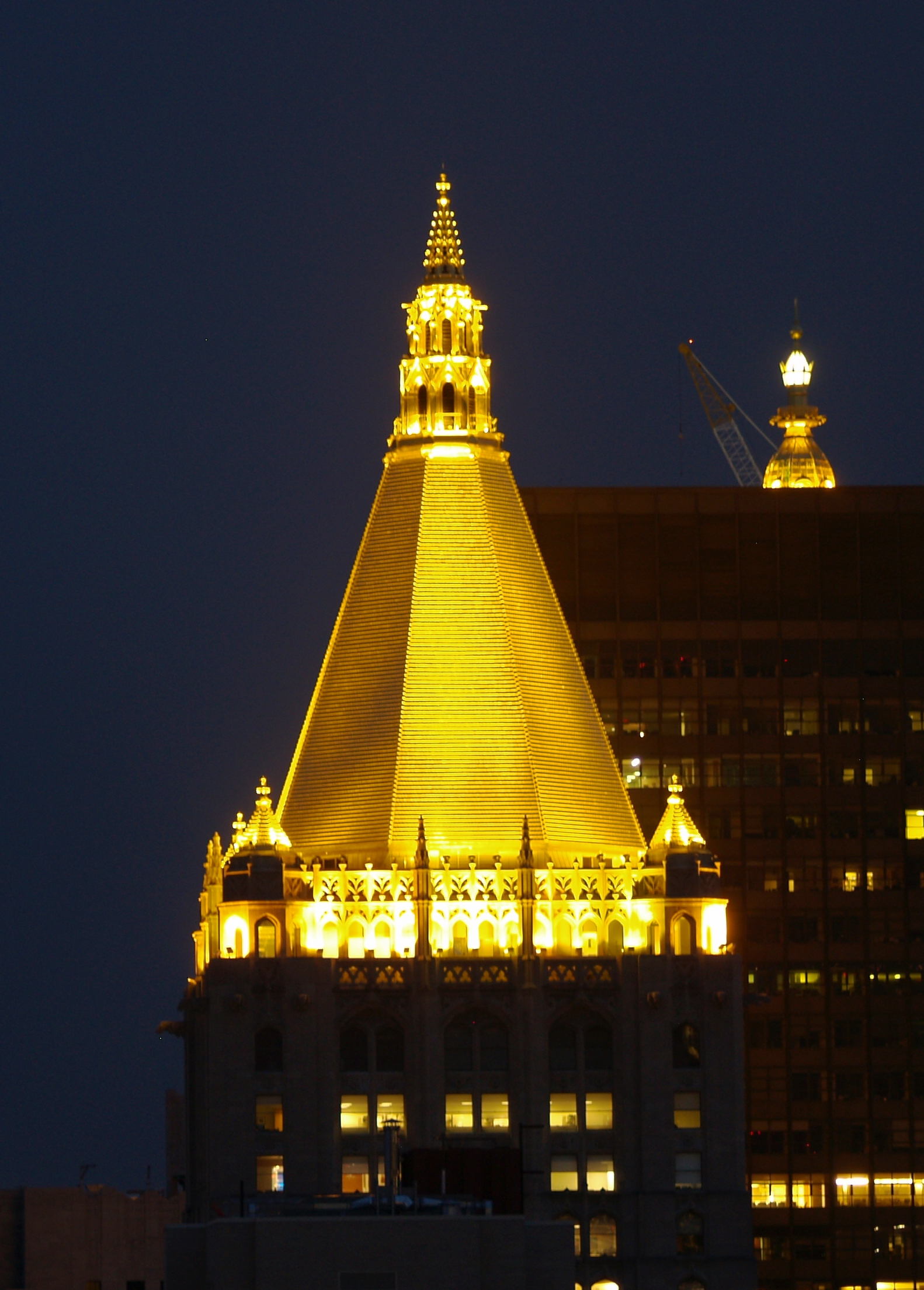
The gold top of the New York Life Building illuminated at night

== Locations and surroundings ==
=== Structures in Rose Hill ===
The Baruch College and School of Visual Arts campuses and the New York University College of Dentistry and Rose Hill Montessori Preschool are all located in Rose Hill. The CURE.Innovation Campus, a life sciences tech incubator receiving financial support from New York State, is located at 345 Park Avenue South in Rose Hill.

The community has several single room occupancy supportive housing ventures. One such venture is Friends House in Rosehill, a Quaker venture that, in effect, recovered the neighborhood's old name; another is the Prince George Hotel, sponsored by Common Ground.

=== Madison Square ===
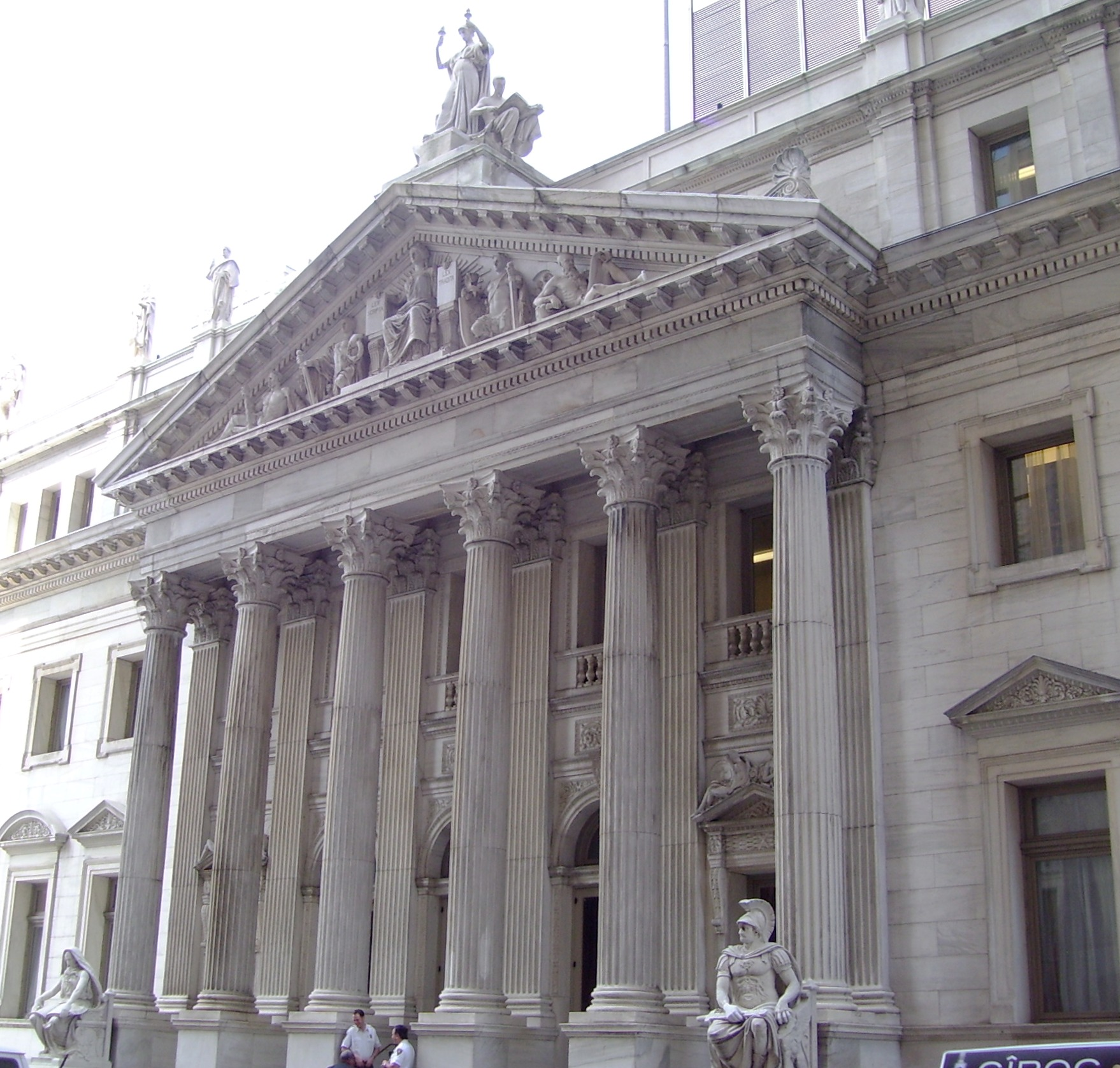
The New York Supreme Court, Appellate Division, First Department

Madison Square anchors the neighborhood's southwest corner, bounded by 23rd Street, 26th Street, Fifth Avenue, and Madison Avenue. The original Madison Square Garden at Madison Square was located at the corner of Madison Avenue and 26th Street, and stood at the site from 1879 to 1890. The second Madison Square Garden, located at the same site, was designed by Stanford White, who would later be killed at the Garden's rooftop restaurant. This second incarnation of Madison Square Garden stood at 26th Street from 1890 to 1925, when the Garden was relocated to the West Side at 50th Street and Eighth Avenue. White kept an apartment in the tower of Madison Square Garden; there are conflicting accounts of whether the famous "red velvet swing" was in that apartment, or in a nearby building on 24th Street which White rented. In 2007, the building on 24th Street collapsed due to damage from a fire that occurred in 2003.

Madison Square is dominated by the MetLife Tower, which until 2005 was the headquarters of the Metropolitan Life Insurance Company; and the New York Life Building located on the site of the original Madison Square Garden, the current headquarters of New York Life Insurance Company. Those buildings are designated New York City landmarks, as is the Appellate Division of the New York Supreme Court of New York State, between them. The blocks north and west of the park, part of the neighborhood of NoMad, were designated the Madison Square North Historic District in 2001, a delineation which covers sections of three blocks on the west side of Broadway as well. The historic district is the site of the Museum of Sex, located at Fifth Avenue and 27th Street. It is also the site of The James New York – NoMad and the Evelyn Hotel.

== "Curry Hill" ==
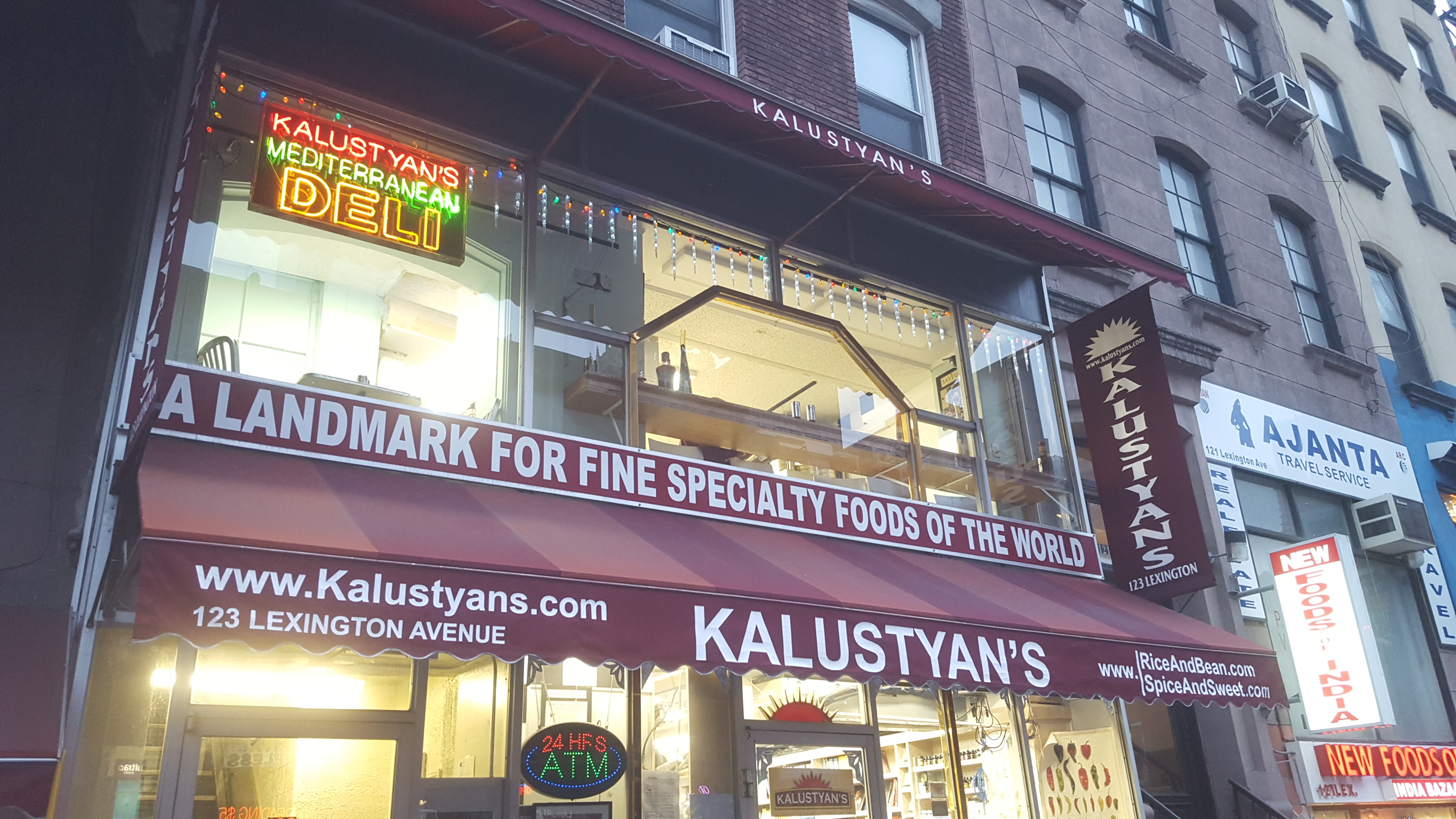
Kalustyan's is a long-time presence in the neighborhood

A number of Asian Indian (mostly southern Indian) restaurants and spice shops lie along a stretch of Lexington Avenue between 25th and 30th Streets, known as Curry Hill or Little India. They sprung up due to the presence of Kalustyan's, a spice shop. This section of Rose Hill was formerly also known as Little Armenia.

== Transportation ==
Rose Hill is served by four New York City Subway stations. The 23rd Street and 28th Street stations on the BMT Broadway Line offer service on the R and W trains at Broadway in nearby NoMad. The 23rd Street–Baruch College and 28th Street stations of the IRT Lexington Avenue Line are both located on Park Avenue South, offering service on the 6 and <6> trains.

The area is served by the New York City Bus routes M1, M2 and M3 on Park and Madison Avenues (northbound) and Fifth Avenues (southbound), with M55 service also on Fifth Avenue southbound; M101, M102 and M103 on Third and Lexington Avenues, northbound and southbound, respectively; and M15 and M15 SBS on First and Second Avenues, northbound and southbound, respectively. The M23 SBS crosstown bus service is on 23rd Street.

== See also ==
- Midtown South
