= St. Illuminator's Armenian Apostolic Cathedral =

Cathedral in Manhattan, New York

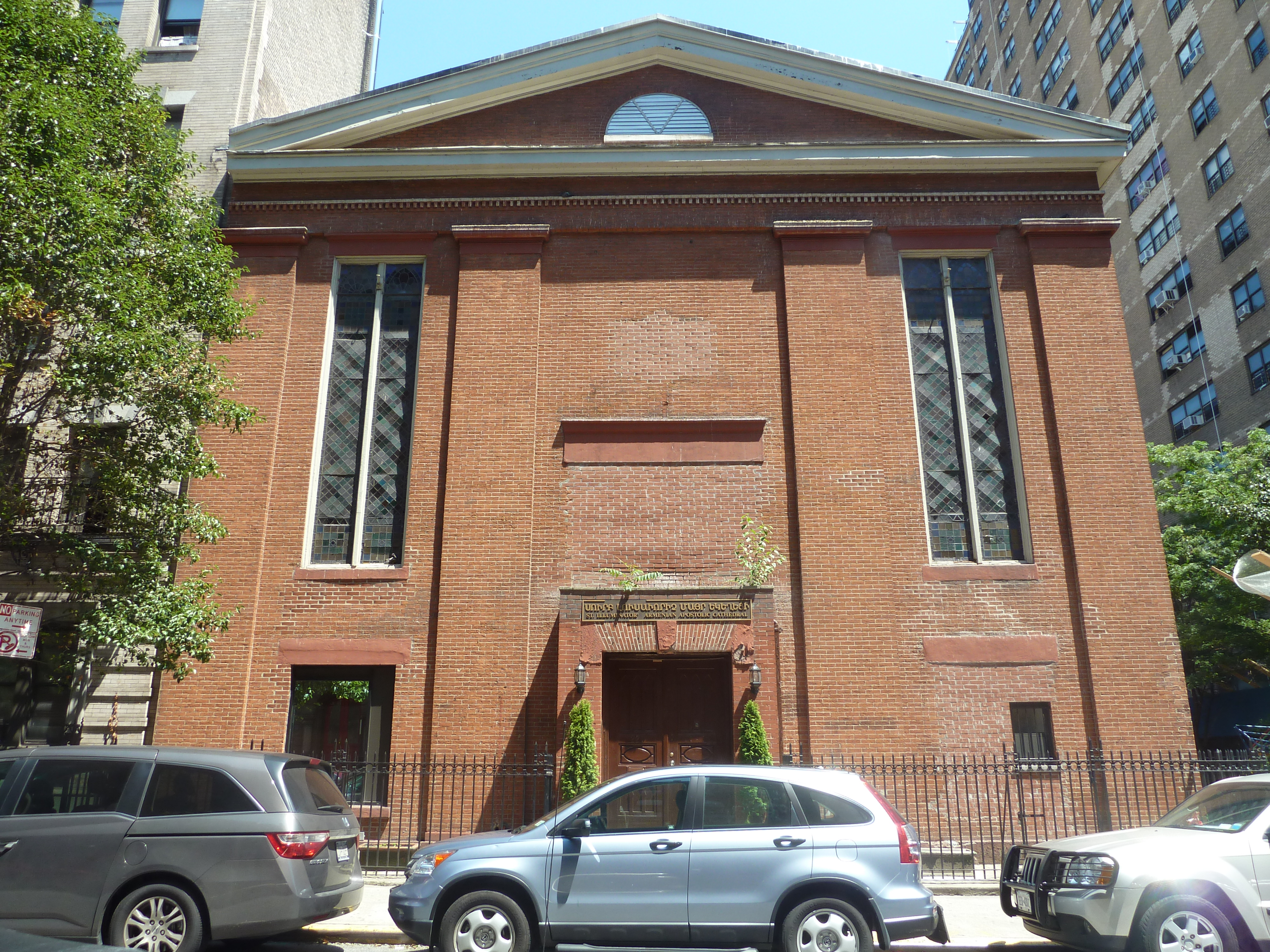
- The cathedral in 2012
- St. Illuminator's Armenian Apostolic Cathedral
- 40°44′28″N 73°58′49″W
- Address: 221 East 27th Street; New York, NY
- Country: United States
- Denomination: Armenian Apostolic Church
- Previous denomination: Methodist Episcopal Church
- Website: stilluminators.org

History
- Former name: Rose Hill Methodist Episcopal Church
- Dedication: Gregory the Illuminator
- Consecrated: April 17, 1921

Architecture
- Style: Greek Revival
- Completed: 1849

Administration
- Diocese: Eastern Prelacy of the Armenian Apostolic Church

St. Illuminator's Armenian Apostolic Cathedral (Armenian: Սուրբ Լուսաիորիչ Մայր Եկեղեցի) is a cathedral located at 221 East 27th Street between Second and Third avenues in the Kips Bay neighborhood of Manhattan in New York City. Originally built in 1849 as the Rose Hill Methodist Episcopal Church, the edifice has been used by the Armenian Apostolic Church since 1915. It is the oldest Armenian church in New York and the cathedral of the Eastern Prelacy of the Armenian Apostolic Church, which falls under the jurisdiction of the Holy See of Cilicia.

== History ==
=== Opening and early years ===
Beginning at the turn of the 20th century, Armenians escaping persecution in the Ottoman Empire—including the Hamidian massacres and the Armenian genocide—moved to New York City and formed "Little Armenia" on the East Side of Manhattan. St. Illuminator's was founded in 1910 for Armenians living in the former Gas House District on Manhattan's East Side. Religious services were originally held in other churches in the neighborhood; a proposal to purchase a church of its own was first proposed in 1913 and the collection of funds for a new edifice began the following year. Meanwhile, the changes in the demographics of the neighborhood prompted the Rose Hill Methodist Episcopal Church to seek to relocate or consolidate with another church. A court order signed in 1915 permitted the Rose Hill Church to sell its property at 221 East 27th Street and use the proceeds in paying off the mortgage on the adjacent apartment building that it also owned.

In 1915, the Rose Hill Church merged with the Crawford Memorial Church (located on White Plains Road at East 218th Street in the Bronx); the church on East 27th Street was leased to the Armenians and named "St. Illuminator's Armenian Apostolic Church" in honor of St. Gregory the Illuminator. Services at the Armenian church began in 1916. The church, along with the adjacent six-story apartment house located at 217–219 East 27th Street, were later sold by the Crawford Memorial Methodist Episcopal Church to St. Illuminator's Armenian Church in October 1920. Designed in the Greek Revival style, the church building dates back to 1849 and was reconstructed after a fire had destroyed the prior church on the site in 1848. It is the oldest Armenian church in New York.

On November 10, 1917, St. Illuminator's served as the starting point for a parade held by the New York Committee for Armenian and Syrian Relief that included 3,500 people who escaped the massacre in Armenia. The events of World War I delayed the formal consecration of the church by Archbishop Der Hovhannesian until April 17, 1921. On November 29, 1925, a fire at St. Illuminator's destroyed the main altar and several rows of pews, but spared the chalice. The fire, which was believed to have been caused by faulty insulation, was discovered after parishioners had fled out of the auditorium located on the lower floor of the church.

=== 1930s to 1950s ===
In 1933, a schism developed between anti-Soviet and pro-Soviet groups of the Armenian Apostolic Church in the United States and Canada. The trustees of Saint Illuminator's were strongly aligned with the Tashnag party (also known as Dashnag or Dashnak and the Armenian Revolutionary Federation), which was opposed to the policies of Archbishop Levon Tourian, who exhibited pro-Soviet tendencies.

In September 1933, Saint Illuminator's was the scheduled site of the annual diocesan assembly. A group of anti-Dashnak delegates that were supporters of Tourian walked out of the assembly and held separate meetings at the Hotel Martinique, voting in confidence of the archbishop. Meanwhile, the Dashnak-affiliated delegates continued to meet at St. Illuminator's and voted to remove Tourian. The governing body of the Armenian Apostolic Church in Etchmiadzin (then located in Soviet Armenia) recognized the decisions made by the assembly held at the Hotel Martinique and considered the assembly held at Saint Illuminator's as illegitimate and unconstitutional. Three months later, Tourian was assassinated at the Holy Cross Armenian Church in the Washington Heights neighborhood of Manhattan by members of the Dashnak party. The separate diocesan assemblies marked the beginning of the split of the Armenian Church in America. After the split of the church, St. Illuminator's became a Tashnag stronghold.

A solemn requiem mass mourning the Sovietization of Armenia was held at St. Illuminator's on November 25, 1951, in defiance of orders given by Kevork VI, the Catholicos of All Armenians, that all Armenian churches celebrate November 29 as an anniversary of Armenian liberation. Following the mass, United States Supreme Court justice William O. Douglas addressed the congregation, saying that "the Armenian church has suffered grievously under Soviet imperialism" and that "Dashnag remains a word of honor and distinction, though it now must be whispered and its cause promoted secretly." Douglas had recently visited Iran, where he said he "camped on the border" and learned from interviewing refugees fleeing the region that "all is not well inside Armenia." Police stood on guard outside the church during the mass, which was requested given the assassination of Tourian in 1933.

The split of the Armenian church was formalized in 1956, when the Tashnag congregations were given recognition by the Holy See of Cilicia based in Antelias, Lebanon and broke away from the Mother See of Holy Etchmiadzin. (Note: The division has resulted in the existence of two cathedrals of the Armenian Apostolic Church in Manhattan: St. Illuminator's (under the jurisdiction of the Holy See of Cilicia in Antelias) and St. Vartan (under the jurisdiction of the Mother See of Holy Etchmiadzin).) (Note: Prior to 1920, a group of trustees from St. Illuminator's that disagreed with the purchase of the church on East 27th Street had split off and formed another parish that was also named after Saint Gregory the Illuminator and rented space at several locations in Midtown Manhattan before purchasing a building on East 35th Street that was converted into a church; this parish was later absorbed by St. Vartan Cathedral.) St. Illuminator's is the cathedral of the Eastern Prelacy of the Armenian Apostolic Church, which has been headquartered in New York City since 1958; the Eastern Prelacy's office is located on East 39th Street in the adjacent neighborhood of Murray Hill. The prelacy is affiliated with and falls under the jurisdiction of the Holy See of Cilicia.

=== 1970s to present ===
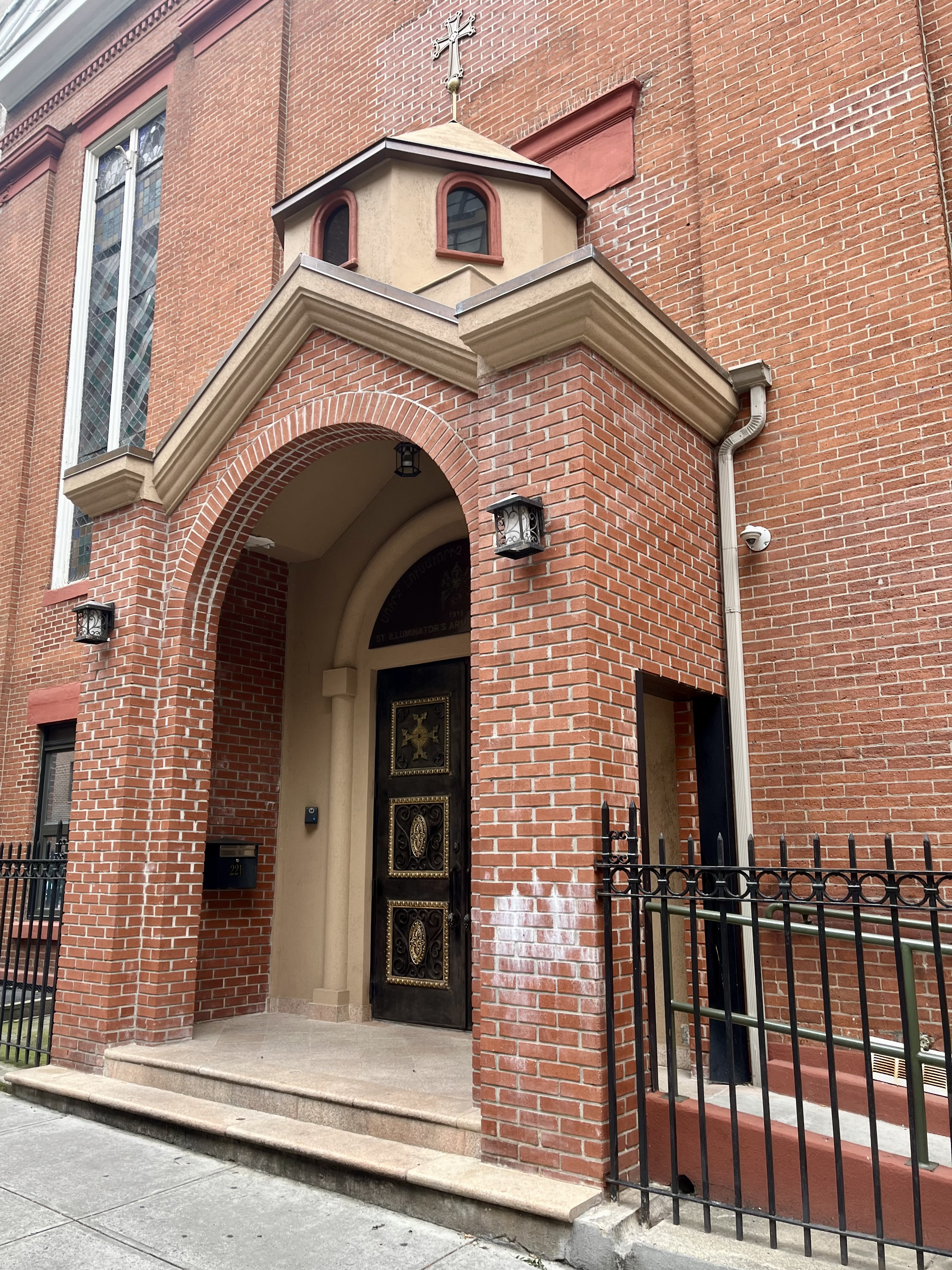
The cathedral's entrance in 2025, after the addition of a portico with a cupola above a polygonal drum

On November 20, 1971, St. Illuminator's served as the starting and ending points for a march of over 1,000 Armenians from the eastern United States demanding reactivation of the Armenian provisions of the Treaty of Sèvres. The march traveled to and from Rockefeller Center and included demonstrations against Mustafa Kemal.

In the days that followed the 1988 Armenian earthquake, St. Illuminator's held a two-hour long memorial service for the victims of the tragedy and the cathedral was used as a hub for emergency aid and supplies used in the relief effort. Vasken I, Catholicos of All Armenians and spiritual leader of the Armenian Apostolic Church under the jurisdiction of the Mother See of Holy Etchmiadzin, visited St. Illuminator's Cathedral in 1989 and presented the church with a silver chrism vessel shaped like a dove. His visit to the United States was focused on healing the division of the Armenian church that occurred in the 1930s.

On April 24, 2000 (Armenian Genocide Memorial Day), a chapel was consecrated at the cathedral that includes sainted martyr remains from the Deir Zor desert; the importance of these remnants of martyrs increased following the destruction of the Armenian Genocide Memorial Church in Syria. St. Illuminator's closed for renovations in 2008 and reopened the following year; the cathedral's altar was re-consecrated at a special service held on September 19, 2009.
