= CBS 30th Street Studio =

Music recording studio in Manhattan, 1948–1981

Coordinates: 40.7431°N 73.9792°W

CBS 30th Street Studio, also known as Columbia 30th Street Studio, and nicknamed "The Church", was a recording studio operated by Columbia Records from 1948 to 1981 located at 207 East 30th Street, between Second and Third Avenues in Manhattan, New York City, United States.

Actually containing two Columbia sound rooms—"Studio C" and "Studio D"—the facility was considered by some in the music industry to offer the best-sounding recording venue of its time, while others considered it to have been the greatest recording studio in history.

Numerous recordings were made there in all genres, including Ray Conniff's 'S Wonderful! (1956), Billie Holiday's "Lady in Satin" (1958), Miles Davis' Kind of Blue (1959) and In A Silent Way (1969), Dave Brubeck's Time Out (1959), Leonard Bernstein's West Side Story (Original Broadway Cast recording, 1957), Percy Faith's "Theme from A Summer Place" (1959), Chicago's Chicago Transit Authority (1969), Chicago (1970), and Chicago III (1971), Pink Floyd's The Wall (1979), John Cale's Honi Soit (1981) as well as a recording about the city itself, Frank Sinatra's "New York, New York".

== Early building and church history ==
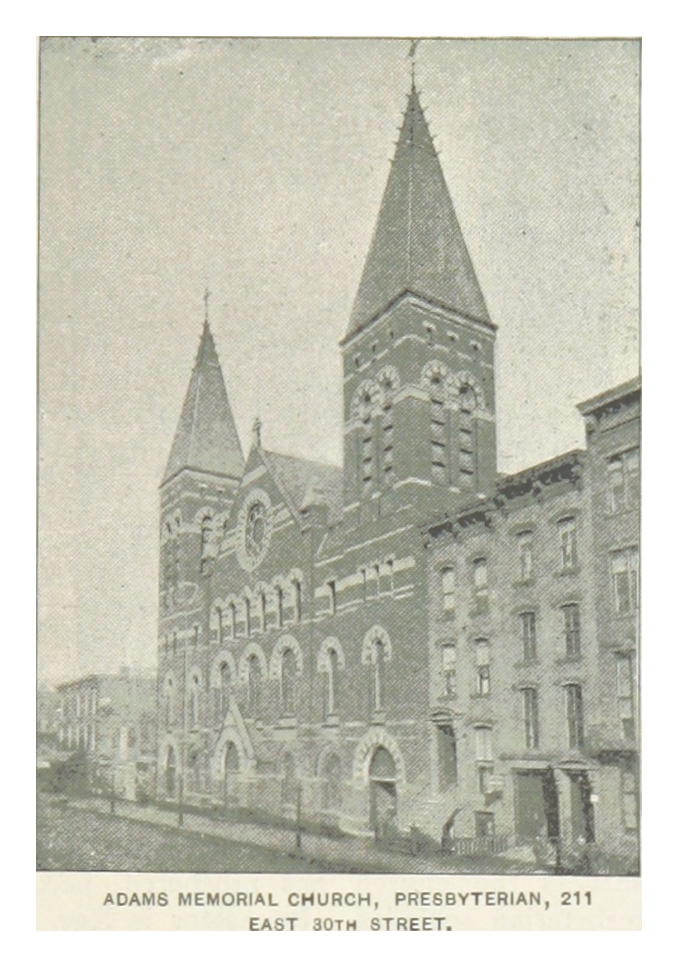
The church, prior to its transformation into a recording studio

The site was originally the Adams-Parkhurst Memorial Presbyterian Church, a mission of the Madison Square Presbyterian Church, designed by the architect J. Cleaveland Cady, and was dedicated March 28, 1875. Several groups shared the building over the years, including a German Lutheran congregation, the Armenian Evangelical Church of New York (1896–1921), and radio station WLIB (1944–1952).

== Recording studio ==
Having been a church for many years, it had been abandoned and empty for some time, and in 1948 it was transformed into a recording studio by Columbia Records.

"There was one big room, and no other place in which to record", wrote John Marks in an article in Stereophile magazine in 2002.

The recording studio was approximately 97 feet (30 m) long by 55 feet (17 m) wide, with a 50-foot-high (15 m) ceiling. The original control room, 8 by 14 feet (2.4 by 4.3 m) in size, was on the second floor. Later, the control room was moved down to the ground floor.

"It was huge and the room sound was incredible," recalls Jim Reeves, a sound technician who had worked in it. "I was inspired," he continues, "by the fact that, aside from the artistry, how clean the audio system was."

A CBS Records A&R executive hailed the former church's unique and varied sound qualities, writing that the studio "resounds with the glory of a symphony orchestra, sparkles with the clarity of a polished piano performance, embraces the exuberance of a Broadway cast in full voice."

== Musical artists ==
Many celebrated musical artists from all genres of music used the 30th Street Studio for some of their most famous recordings.

Bach: The Goldberg Variations, the 1955 debut album of the Canadian classical pianist Glenn Gould, was recorded in the 30th Street Studio. It was an interpretation of Johann Sebastian Bach's Goldberg Variations (BWV 988). The work launched Gould's career as an international pianist, and became one of the best known piano recordings. On May 29, 1981, a second version of the Goldberg Variations by Glenn Gould was recorded in this studio, a year before Gould's death. It was also the last recording session in the studio.

Among Rudolf Serkin's recordings of Beethoven's piano sonatas, nos. 1, 6, 12, 13, 16, 21 (Waldstein), 30, 31 and 32 were recorded there between 1967 and 1980. Vladimir Horowitz recorded his entire Masterworks (originally Columbia then Sony Classical) studio discography there, from 1962–1964 and 1969–1973. Other classical musicians having recorded in the facility included Igor Stravinsky, Leonard Bernstein, Bruno Walter.

Jazz trumpeter Miles Davis recorded almost exclusively at the 30th Street Studio during his years under contract to Columbia, including his album Kind of Blue (1959). Other jazz musicians who recorded in the location include Duke Ellington, Dizzy Gillespie, Thelonious Monk, Dave Brubeck, Charles Mingus, and Billie Holiday (Lady in Satin with Ray Ellis, 1958).

Gospel singer Mahalia Jackson recorded many of her albums at "The Church", including her Christmas album Sweet Little Jesus Boy (1955).

California composer and minimalist music pioneer, Terry Riley recorded both his landmark composition In C (1968) and his collaborative LP with John Cale Church of Anthrax (1971) at the 30th Street Studio.

In 1964, Bob Dylan and record producer Tom Wilson were experimenting with their own fusion of rock and folk music. The first unsuccessful test involved overdubbing a "Fats Domino early rock & roll thing" over Dylan's earlier, recording of "House of the Rising Sun", using non-electric instruments, according to Wilson. This took place in the Columbia 30th Street Studio in December 1964. While it was quickly discarded, Wilson would later use the same technique of overdubbing an electric backing track to an existing acoustic recording with Simon & Garfunkel's "The Sound of Silence".

== Demise ==
Recession woes, combined with high operating costs for the energy-inefficient old church, spelled the beginning of the end for the studio.

Columbia Records failed to buy the building (for an estimated $250,000; equivalent to $830,000 after inflation) when they abandoned their contracts with the studio in 1982. Columbia felt constrained by restrictions imposed by the owner, including a closing time of 10 p.m. or 11 p.m. The owner then sold it for $1.2 million, and it was quickly reacquired for $4.5 million ($15 million after inflation).

The building was later demolished. A 10-story residential apartment building called "The Wilshire", completed in 1985, was built on the site.
