= Armenian Evangelical Church of New York =

Church in Manhattan, New York

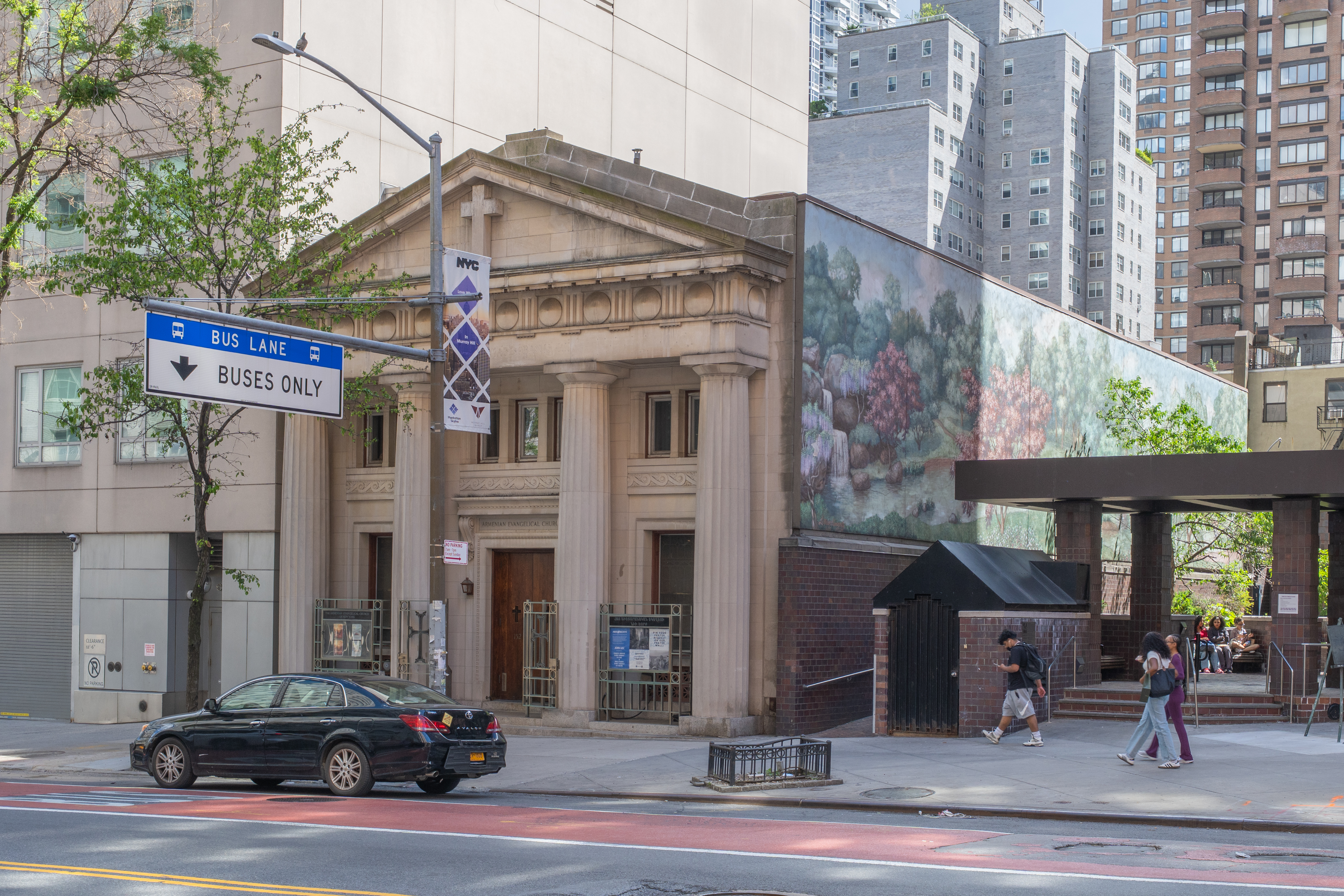
- The church in 2026
- Armenian Evangelical Church of New York
- 40°44′45″N 73°58′44″W
- Address: 152 East 34th Street; New York, NY
- Country: United States
- Denomination: Armenian Evangelical Church
- Website: aecnyc.org

History
- Founded: 1896

Architecture
- Functional status: Active
- Architect: William Ralph Emerson
- Style: Greek Revival
- Years built: 1907

The Armenian Evangelical Church of New York, the oldest Armenian institution in the New York metropolitan area, was founded in 1896. It is located at 152 East 34th Street, in Manhattan, New York City. It is a member church of the Armenian Evangelical Union of North America.

== History ==
Rev. H.H. Khazoyan was the first pastor of the church. Services were initially conducted at the Adams-Parkhurst Presbyterian Church on East 30th Street.

The congregation grew as Armenians escaping persecution in the Ottoman Empire—including the Armenian genocide—moved to New York City and formed "Little Armenia" on the east side of Manhattan. A donation from the Telfeyan family enabled the church to obtain its own location for services, and a building on East 34th Street formerly occupied a branch of the 19th Ward Bank was purchased in 1921. With alterations, the cost of the building was about $110,000. The new church was dedicated on Christmas Sunday in 1923.

Rev. Antranig Bedikian served the church for nearly 40 years (1915–1953).

In 1985, the church sold its air rights to an adjacent development, the proceeds of which were used to create an endowment and allow for a renovation. The renovation work was completed in 1988.

In 2025, the Historic Districts Council, in partnership with the Rose Hill/Kips Bay Coalition, requested the New York City Landmarks Preservation Commission evaluate the building for potential designation as an individual landmark.

== Architecture ==
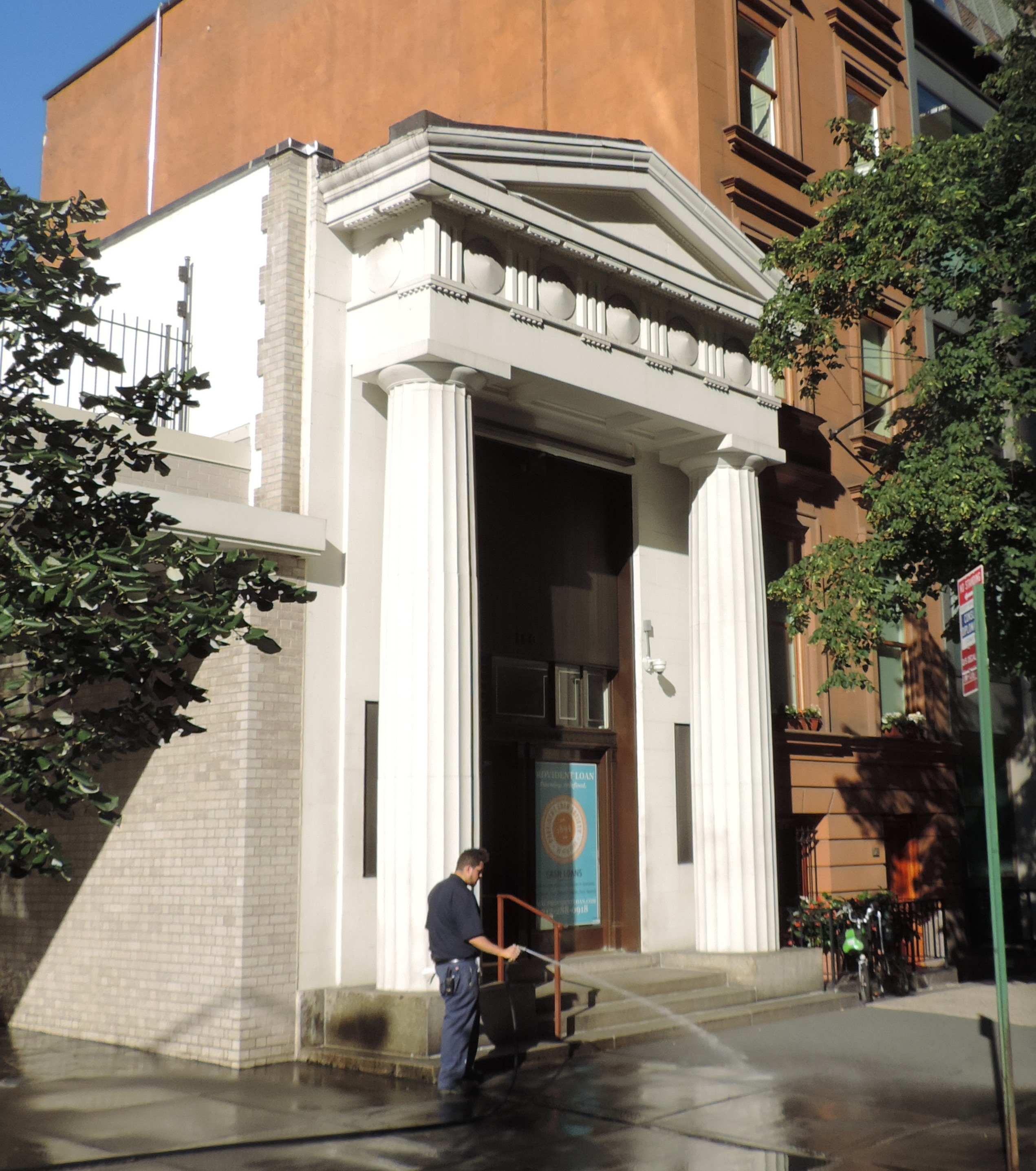
180 E. 72nd St. in 2015

The building that the church occupies on East 34th Street was originally constructed in 1907 as a branch for the 19th Ward Bank. Designed by architect William Ralph Emerson, the limestone structure includes Doric columns and was similar to the plans for another branch of the bank located on the Upper East Side, although the land lot for the branch on 72nd Street was only 20 feet (6.1 m) wide, as compared to a width of 36 feet (11 m) for the site on 34th Street. The architectural style was chosen so that the bank building would stand out among the row of brownstones that stood on either side of the site. As of 2015, the former 19th Ward Bank branch location at 180 East 72nd Street was occupied by the Provident Loan Society.

The chancel of the church includes a stained glass window with a central panel depicting a scene from a 16th century Armenian manuscript Gospel and side panels depicting Saint Mesrop Mashtots and Saint Sahag Bartev. The window was created by Howard, Geisler and Rowe under the supervision of Hovsep Pushman.

== Pastors ==
- Rev. H. H. Khazoyan (1896–1901)
- Rev. H. B. Garabedian (1901–1908)
- Rev. M. G. Papazian (1908–1914)
- Rev. Antranig Bedikian (1915–1953)
- Rev. Nishan Bekian (1936–1942)
- Rev. Zakariah Boudakian (1947–1950)
- Rev. Dr. Dicran Kassouni (1955–1959)
- Rev. Vartkes Kassouni (1959–1964)
- Rev. Senekerim Sulahian (1964–1975)
- Rev. Zenas Ilanjian (1976–1979)
- Rev. G. Diran Minassian (1979–1981)
- Rev. Dr. Herald Hassessian (1981–1985)
- Rev. Daniel Albarian (1985–1988)
- Rev. Dr. Leon Tavitian (1988–1995)
- Rev. Dr. Herald Hassessian (1995–1996)
- Rev. L. Nishan Bakalian (1995–2000)
- Rev. Dr. Peter Doghramji (2000–2004; 2006–2011)
- Rev. Dr. Haig Kherlopian (2013–2022)
