= Midtown South =

Neighborhood of Manhattan in New York City

Coordinates: 40.7470°N 73.9792°W

- Neighborhood of Manhattan
- Interactive map of Midtown South
- Country: United States
- State: New York
- County: New York
- City: New York City
- Established: 1986

Population (2010)
  - Total: 28,630
- Neighborhood tabulation area; includes Midtown
- Time zone: UTC-5 (EST)
  - Summer (DST): UTC-4 (EDT)
- Area code: 212

Midtown South is a macro-neighborhood of the borough of Manhattan in New York City, generally characterized as constituting the southern portion of Midtown Manhattan. Midtown Manhattan hosts over 700,000 daily employees as a busy hub for workers, residents, and tourists. The Empire State Building, the Flatiron Building, Pennsylvania Station, Madison Square Garden, the Macy's Herald Square flagship store, Koreatown, and NYU Langone Medical Center are all located in Midtown South.

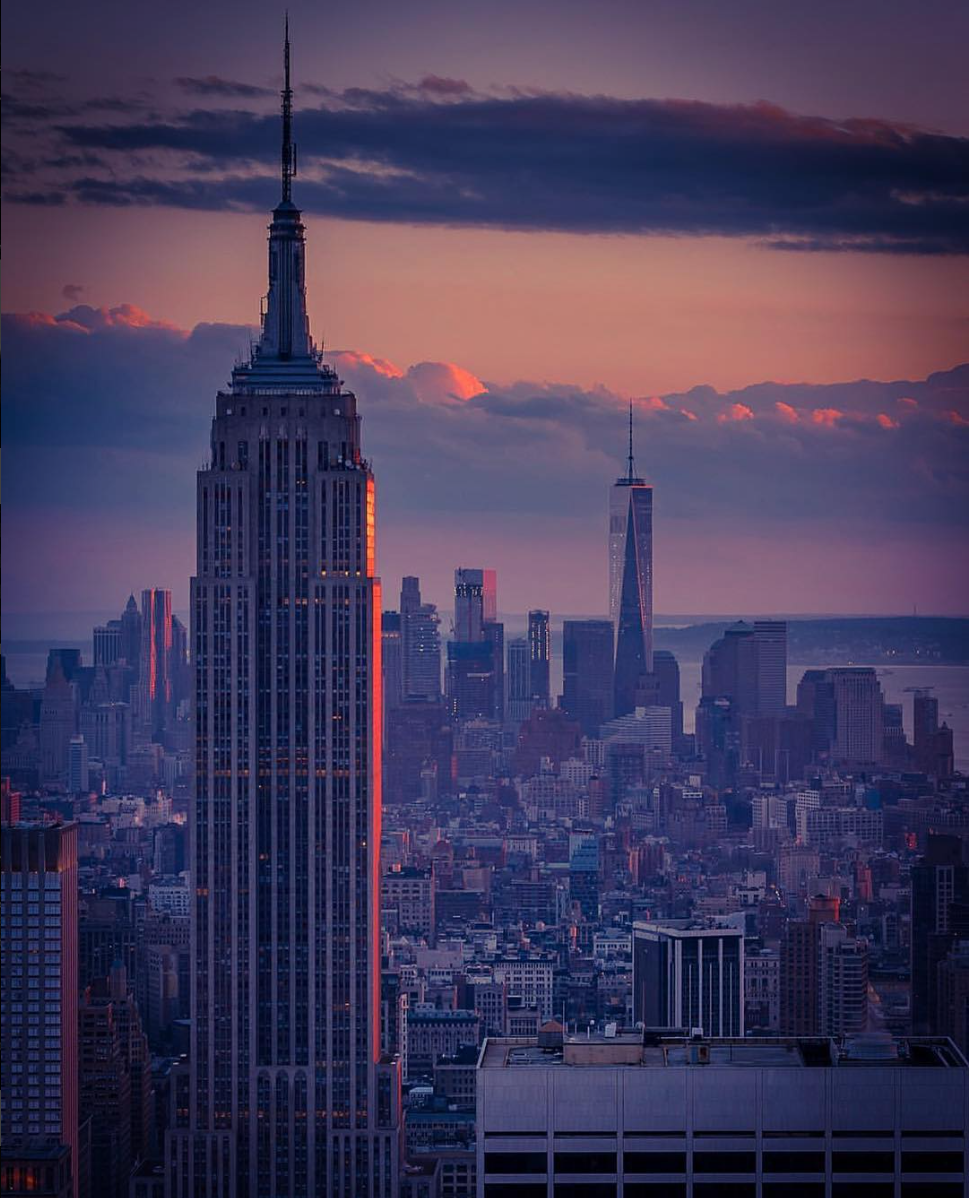
The Empire State Building in the foreground looking southward from the top of Rockefeller Center, with One World Trade Center in the background, at sunset. The Midtown South Community Council acts as a civic caretaker for much of the neighborhood between the high-rise areas of Midtown and Lower Manhattan.

== Neighborhoods ==
Midtown South is generally used to refer to the portion of Midtown below roughly 42nd Street, particularly the south-central part of Midtown.

One definition of "Midtown South" refers to the boundaries of the Midtown South police precinct. The New York City Police Department (NYPD)'s Midtown South Precinct is bounded by 29th Street to the south, 45th Street to the north, Ninth Avenue to the west, and Lexington Avenue to the east (except for the portion between 40th and 34th Streets, for which Madison Avenue is the eastern boundary).

Midtown South has a different definition in the commercial real estate context, where it is used to refer to the relatively low-rise office submarket located roughly between 34th or 30th Street and Canal or Chambers Street.

As described by The Wall Street Journal, the neighborhood is bounded roughly by 45th Street to the north, 29th Street to the south, Ninth Avenue to the west, and Lexington Avenue to the east, which corresponds closely with the Midtown South police precinct. According to Newsday, Midtown South is bounded by 42nd Street to the north, 23rd Street to the south, Lexington Avenue to the east, and Eighth Avenue to the west. As used by The New York Times Real Estate Pricing Guide, the neighborhood is bounded roughly by 42nd Street to the north, 23rd Street to the south, Sixth Avenue to the west, and Park Avenue to the east.

Midtown South encompasses several neighborhoods, including Chelsea, Hudson Yards and the Garment District on the West Side; Koreatown centrally; and Kips Bay, Murray Hill, and Rose Hill on the East Side. Midtown is also sometimes subclassified into "Midtown East" and "Midtown West", or divided by north and south as in the New York City Police Department's Midtown North and Midtown South precincts.

A list of the neighborhoods relative to streets and avenues in the Midtown South macro-neighborhood is as follows:

- Chelsea, from 34th Street to 23rd Street and from the Hudson River to the Avenue of the Americas, including the Hudson Yards development
- Hudson Yards, between West 30th and 42nd Streets from the Hudson River to Eighth Avenue
- The Garment District, from West 42nd to 34th Streets and from Ninth Avenue to Fifth Avenue
- Greeley Square and Herald Square, at the intersection of Broadway and Sixth Avenue, between West 32nd and 35th Streets
- Kips Bay, between 34th Street and 27th Street and from Third Avenue to the East River
- Koreatown, from 36th Street to 31st Street and from Madison Avenue to Sixth Avenue; Korea Way, on 32nd Street between Fifth Avenue and Broadway
- Murray Hill, from East 42nd Street to East 34th Street and from Fifth Avenue to Second Avenue
- Rose Hill, from 32nd Street to 23rd Street and between Madison Avenue and Third Avenue
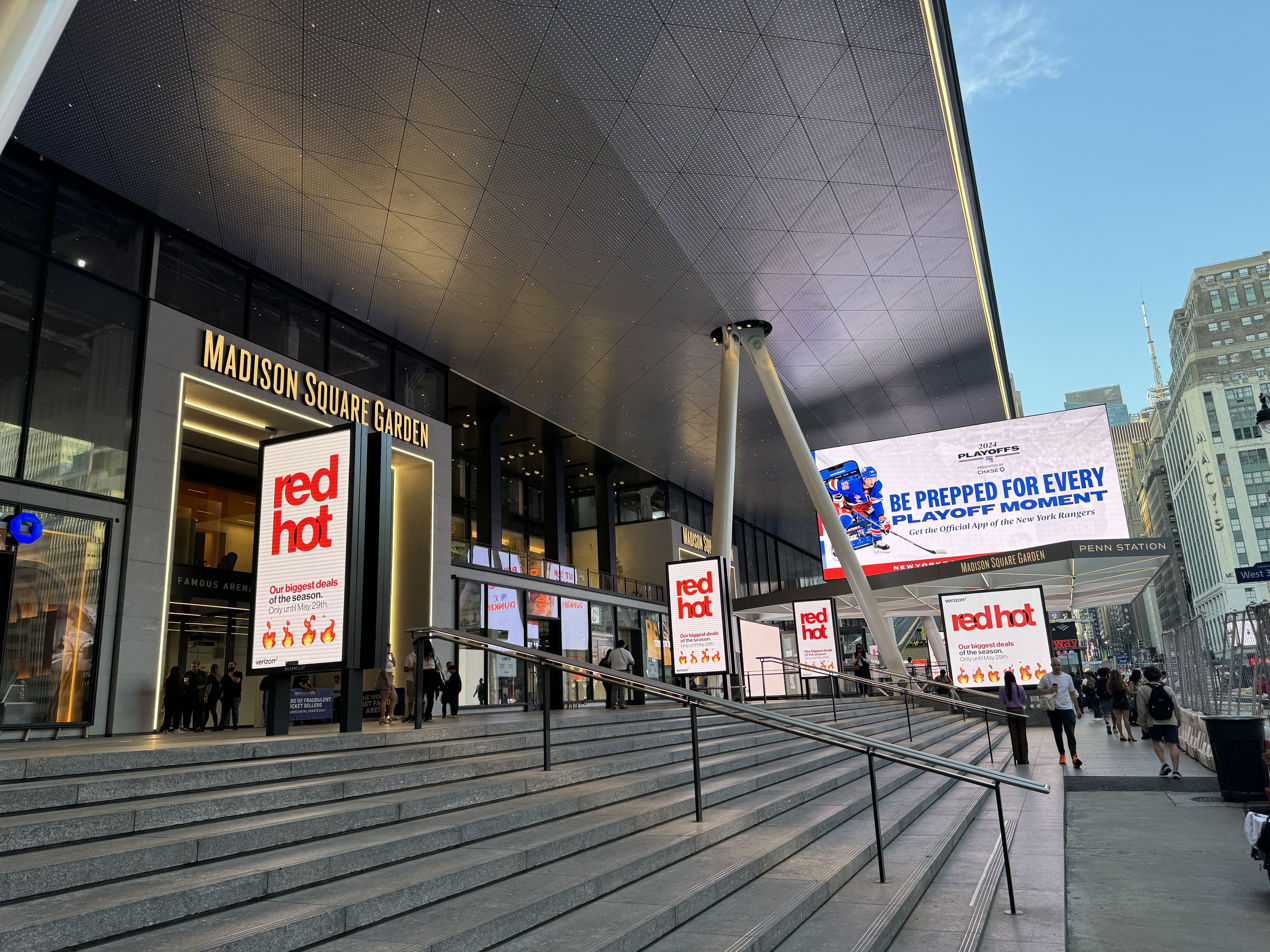
Madison Square Garden and Pennsylvania Station

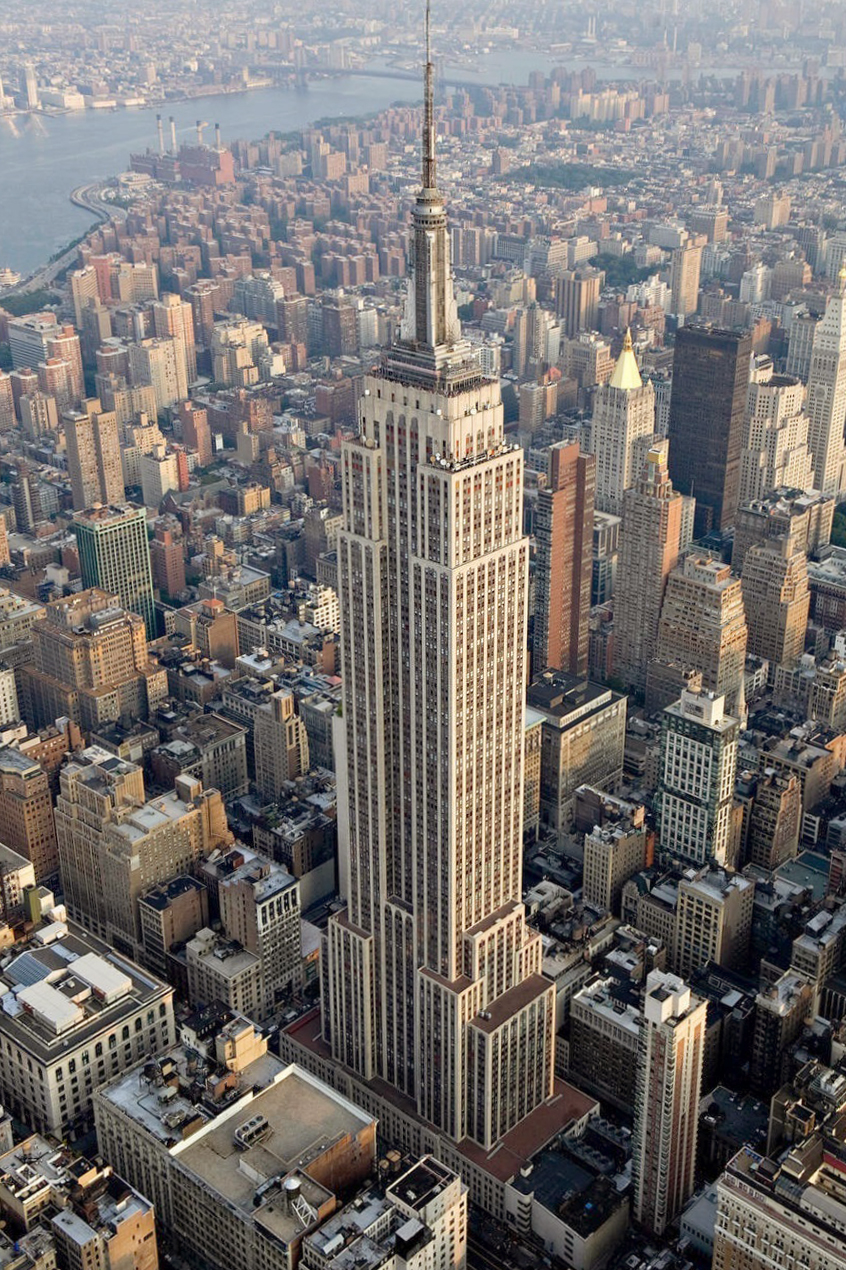
The Empire State Building

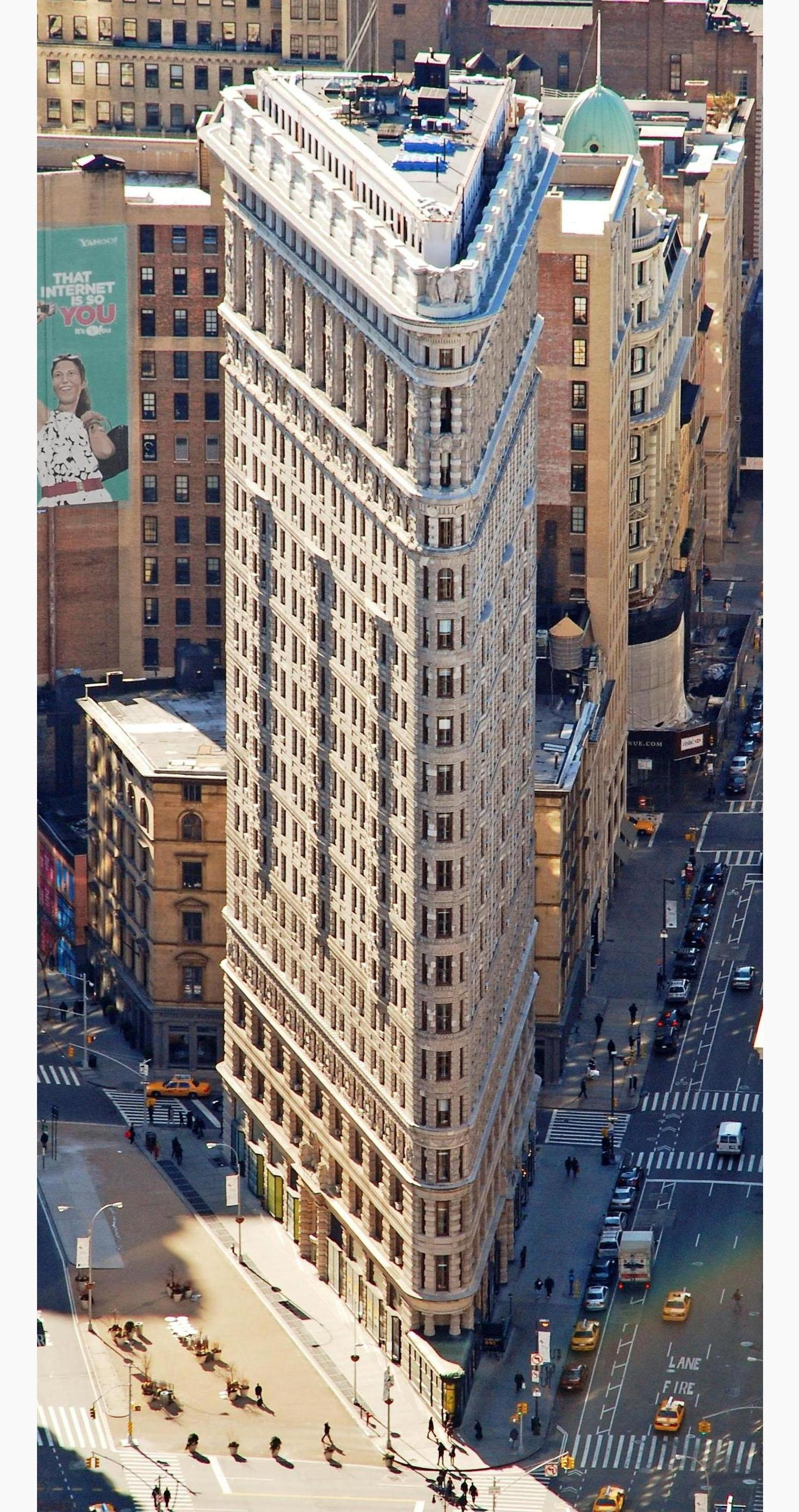
The Flatiron Building

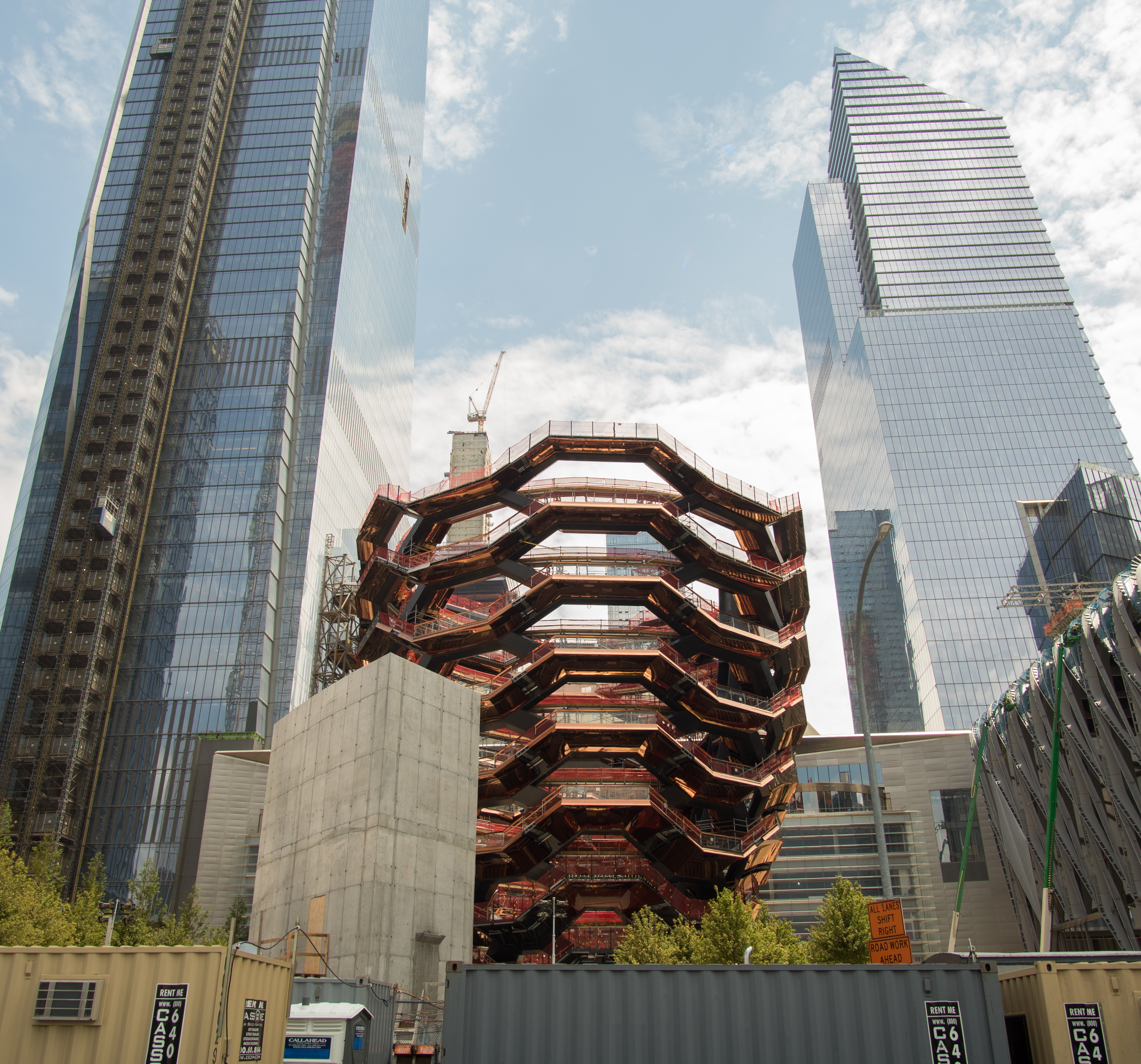
Hudson Yards in Chelsea

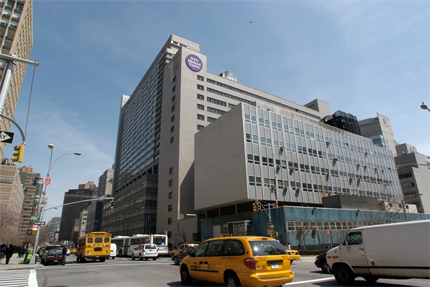
NYU Langone Medical Center

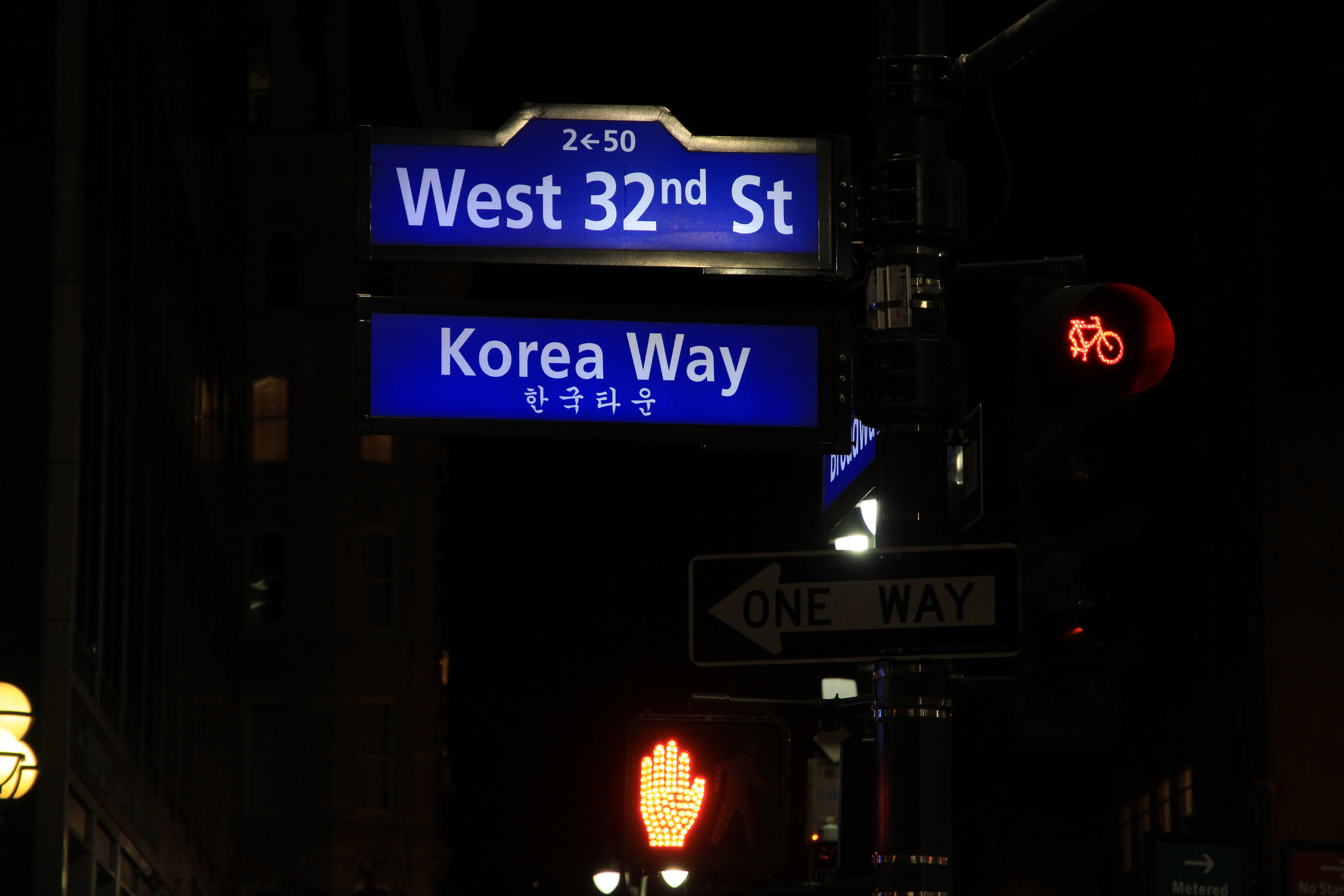
The Korea Way sign illuminated at night, with "Koreatown" (한국타운) written in Hangul

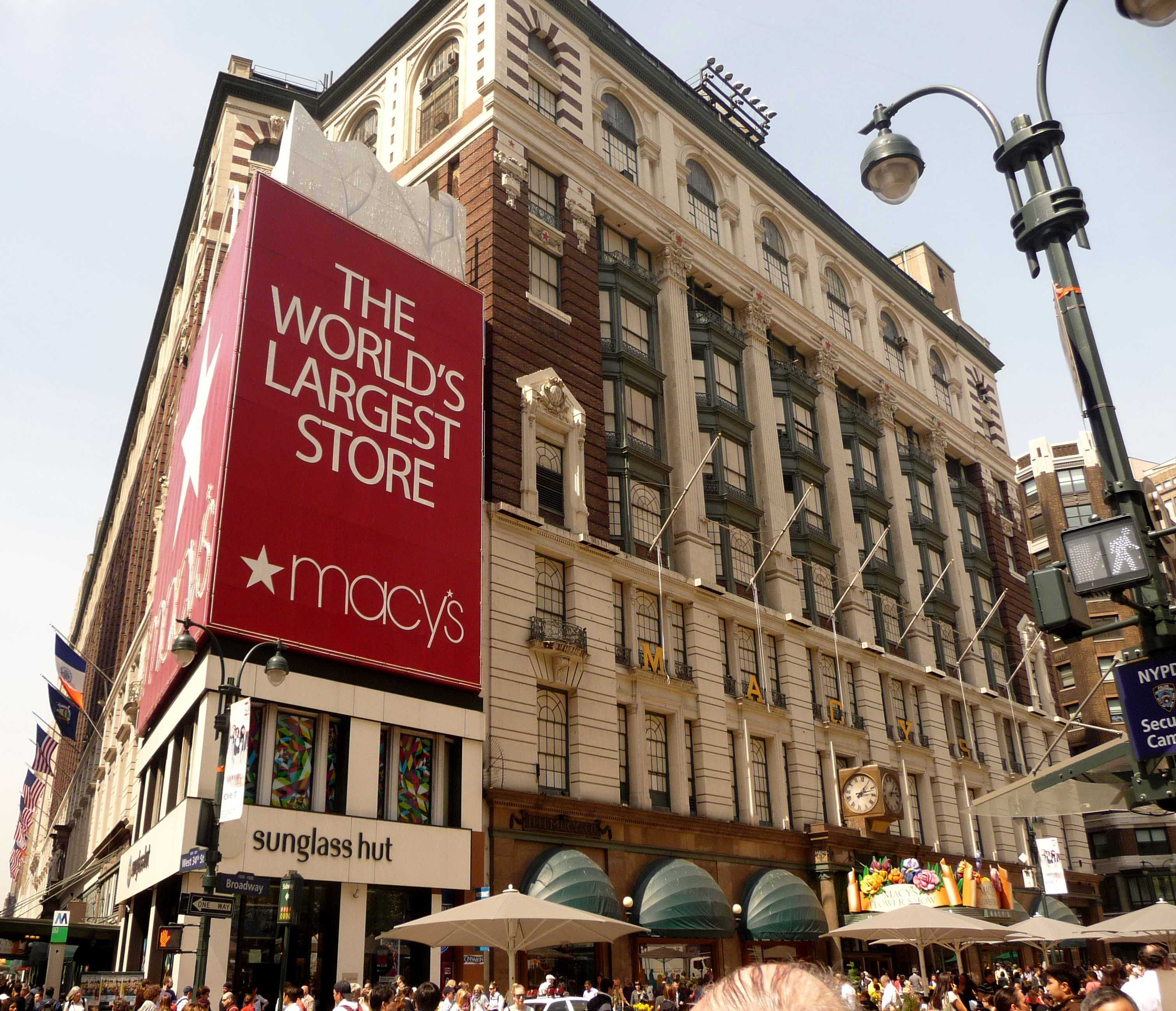
Macy's Herald Square, with the Million Dollar Corner in the foreground

== Midtown South Community Council ==
The Midtown South Community Council (MSCC) is a community organization based in Midtown South. It was established in 1983, formed as a civic caretaker to combat the many problems confronting residents in this highly commercialized area of Manhattan. It overlaps much of the present-day neighborhood of Midtown South. In the 1980s, the quality of life was suboptimal and crime was rampant. Initially, there were daytime and nighttime councils, separating businesses and residents; the two councils eventually merged. The merger was felt to be the most effective way to bring solutions to the problems facing the business and residential communities of Midtown South, as these problems often involved the two either as allies or adversaries. The U.S. Census population of the macro-neighborhood in 2000 was 25,807, and in 2010, an increase of 2,823 was noted, and bringing the population to 28,630. Today the Midtown South Community Council, a not-for-profit, 501(c)(3) organization, is devoted to building better neighborhoods and stronger relationships within Midtown South. The community councilmembers gather at the New Yorker Hotel and address problems, along with the Midtown South Precinct representatives: usually the inspector, detectives, and members. The meetings have regular visitors from the City Council, District Attorney, Midtown Community Court, Area Community Board, and various civilian outreach groups. They also often receive officers in training, officers from cabaret, crime, traffic, drug, and peddler units. The community council no longer has any ties to the NYPD as of April 2021.

== 2025 rezoning ==
In August 2025, the New York City Council approved the Midtown South Mixed-Use (MSMX) rezoning plan. This plan would allow 9,500 residential units to be constructed in an area between Fifth Avenue, 23rd Street, Eighth Avenue, and 40th Street. In conjunction with the rezoning, five buildings were preserved as New York City designated landmarks.
