= Christmas Sunday =

Sunday after Christmas

- Date: Sunday after Christmas
- 2024 date: December 29, 2024
- 2025 date: December 28, 2025
- 2026 date: December 27, 2026
- 2027 date: December 26, 2027
- Frequency: annual
- Related to: Christmas

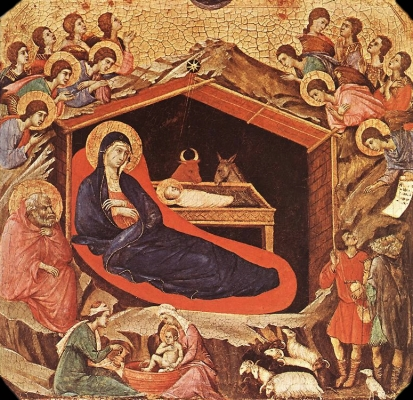
The Nativity of Christ (Byzantine icon).

Christmas Sunday is a name for the Sunday after Christmas.

In the United Kingdom, if Christmas Day falls on a Saturday, 26 December is sometimes referred to as "Christmas Sunday", and Boxing Day moves to 27 December, although this practice has now fallen out of common usage and 26 December is usually referred to as Boxing Day even when it falls on a Sunday.

In Western Christianity, the first Sunday after Christmas is called the "First Sunday of Christmas".

Christmas Sunday usually coincides with the "Sunday After the Nativity" feast day that commemorates King David, Saint Joseph (who is called "Joseph the Betrothed"), and James the Brother of the Lord. Special hymns for these saints are found in the Menaion, which are combined with hymns for the Feast of the Nativity, and special Epistle and Gospel readings are chanted at the Divine Liturgy. If there is no Sunday between December 25 and January 1, this feast is moved to December 26, where it is combined with the Synaxis of the Theotokos. The Saturday After Nativity also has a special Epistle and Gospel reading (though no hymns, except those of the Afterfeast). The Saturday Before Theophany has a special Epistle and Gospel reading of its own, and if both days fall on the same Saturday, both sets of readings are chanted.
