= Kalustyan's =

Shop in Manhattan, New York City

Coordinates: 40°44′34″N 73°58′55″W

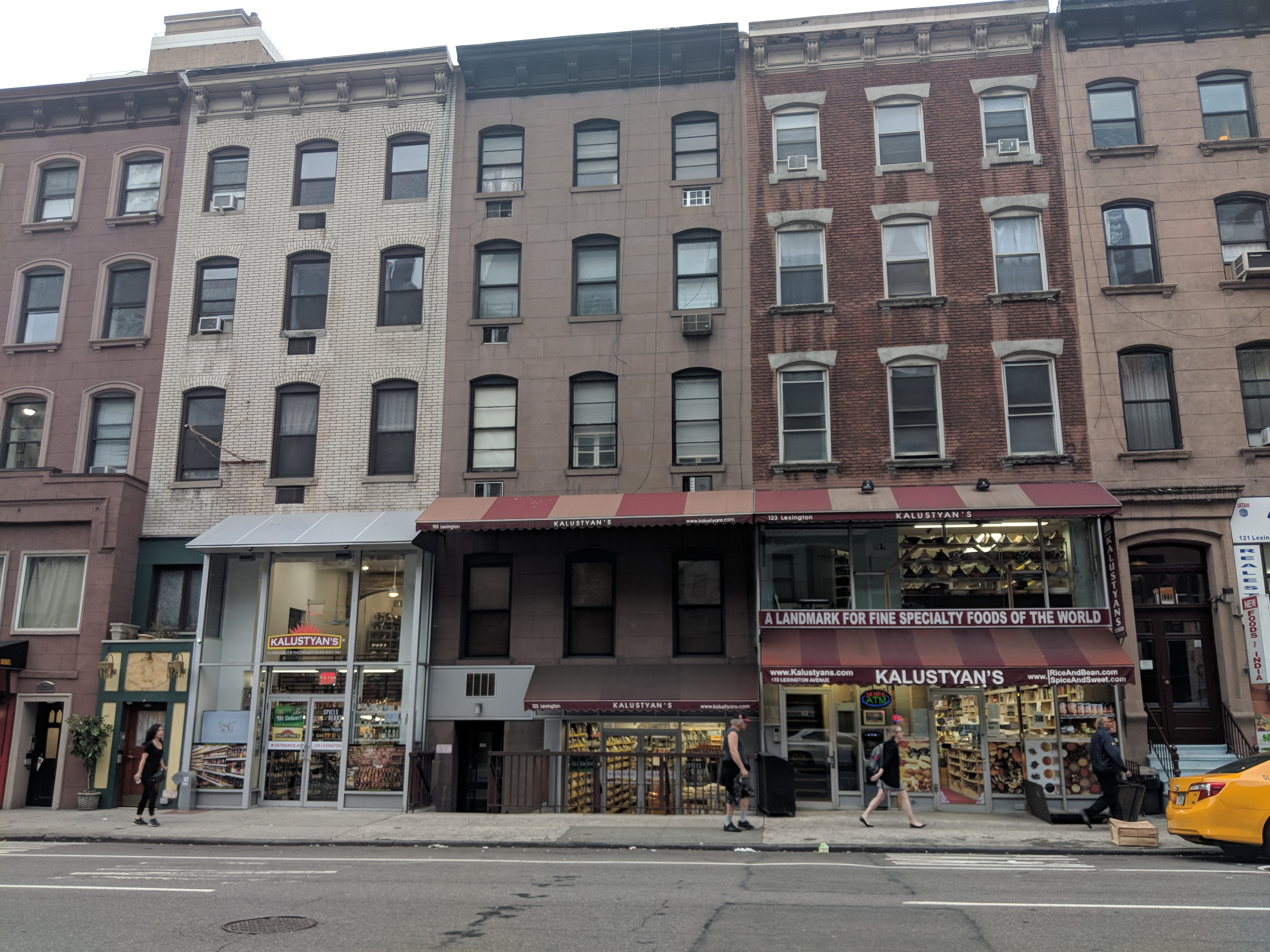
- Kalustyan's in June 2018
- Company type: Private
- Industry: Grocery
- Founded: 1944; 82 years ago in New York City, United States
- Founder: Kerope Kalustyan
- Fate: Active
- Owner: Sayedul Alam and Aziz Osmani
- Website: kalustyans.com

Kalustyan’s is a shop located at 123 Lexington Avenue, Manhattan, New York City, that originally sold primarily Middle Eastern spices and foods and, increasingly, an extensive selection of culinary products from around the world. Established in 1944 by Kerope Kalustyan, an Armenian from Turkey, it sold Turkish and Middle Eastern spices, dried fruits, nuts, oils and grains, when the neighborhood was largely Armenian. In the late 1960s and 1970s, when New York became home to a significant number of Indians, Kalustyan's expanded itself to cater to the Indian market, while bringing out its own brand of chutney and mango pickles.

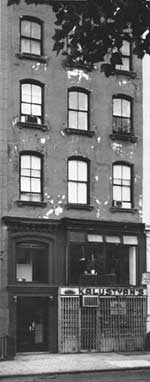
Kalustyan's in 1976

== History ==
=== Presidential town house ===
The building was originally built for Chester A. Arthur, in the 1860s. He was inaugurated President of the United States on an upper floor. After his death, it was sold to a young William Randolph Hearst, who ran the New York Journal from there. During the 1910s, the inhabitants of the neighborhood became less wealthy and white.

=== Little Armenia ===
Kerope Kalustyan came to the US in the 1940s from Istanbul to export steel to Turkey, but the business was unsuccessful. He turned to import food products from the Middle East and India. The location was at the time known as Little Armenia. In the 1920s, about eight thousand Armenians lived in New York City and the center of their community was Lexington Avenue and 23rd Street. With rising prosperity, the Armenian community gradually moved elsewhere, with Kalustyan's the most visible relic. The Armenian Evangelical Church of New York, St. Illuminator's Armenian Apostolic Cathedral and the gold-domed St. Vartan Armenian Cathedral still stand in the neighborhood.

=== Emergence of "Curry Hill" ===
Migration of Indians increased in the late 1960s and 1970s, and Kalustyan's came to be well-regarded as a store for Indian spices. The store became a popular place for Indians to meet. As many Indian immigrants opened their own spice and sweets stores in the neighborhood, followed by Indian restaurants, clothing, art and appliance stores, the neighborhood, known primarily as Murray Hill, was nicknamed "Curry Hill" aka "Little India".

== Current business ==
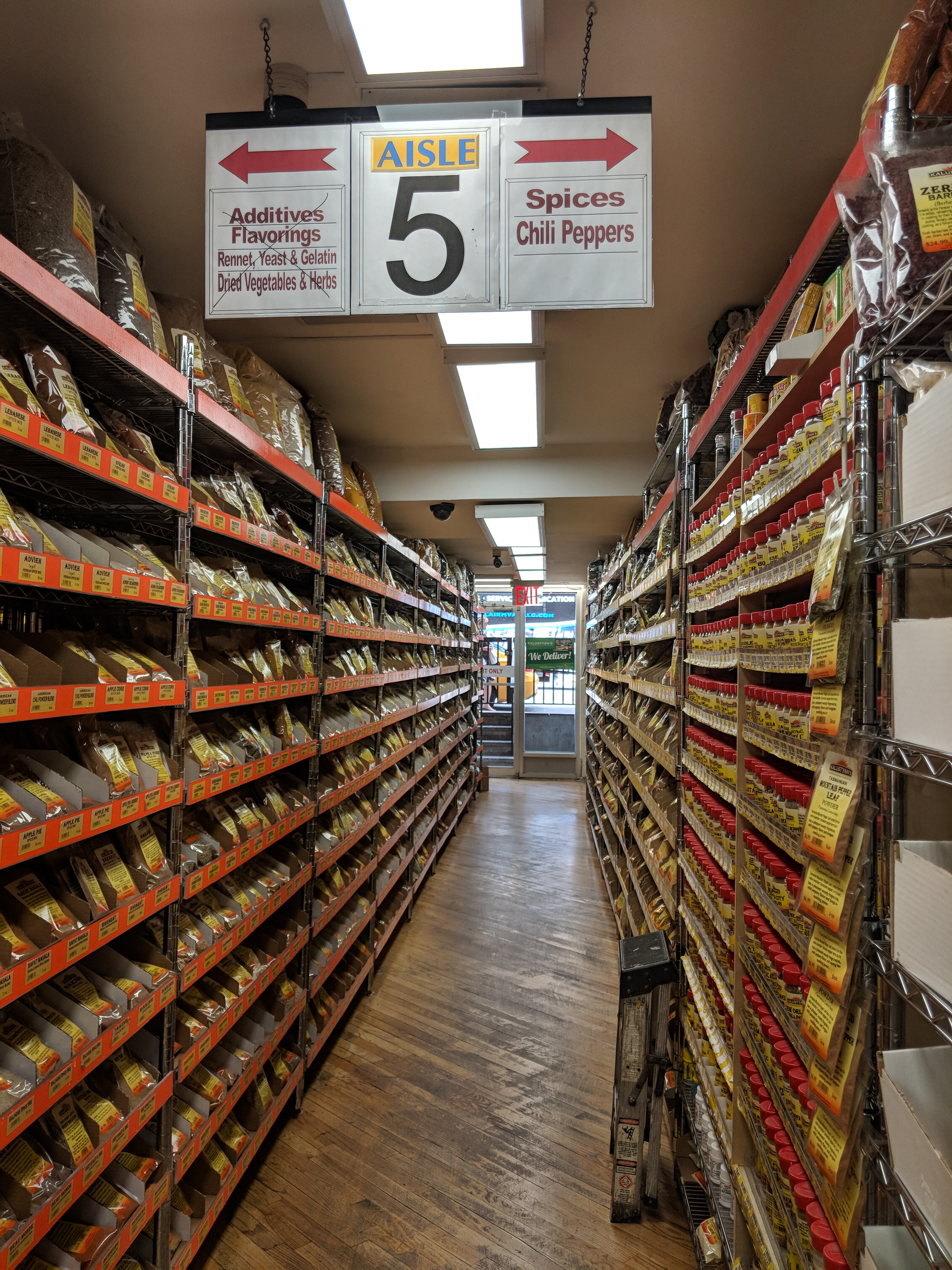
The store stocks spices and other ingredients from around the world.

Kalustyan eventually sold the shop to John Bas, a relative and employee. In 1988 the Kalustyan’s store was purchased by Bangladeshi businessmen Sayedul Alam and Aziz Osmani, who transformed the shop from an Indian/Armenian/Turkish store to one with over 10,000 food products from over 80 countries, and added an eat-in café/deli on the second floor. Bas later founded the Kalustyan Corporation, a New Jersey–based importer.

Kalustyan’s is frequently mentioned by food writers in The New York Times and by celebrity authors such as Martha Stewart, Padma Lakshmi, and Madhur Jaffrey.

== See also ==
- Armenian cuisine
- Indian cuisine
- Indians in New York
