= Józef Kapustka =

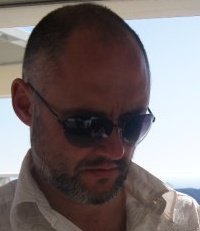

Background information
- Born: 1969 (age 56–57); Tarnów, Poland
- Genre: Classical
- Instrument: Piano
- Years active: 1987–present
- Labels: Dux, Naxos, Naxos of America

Józef Kapustka (Tarnów, 1969) is a Polish classical pianist. He currently lives in Paris, France.

== Biography and schooling ==
Jozef Kapustka was born in 1969. He began receiving early musical tuition from local instructor Danuta Cieślik at the age of 3. He then briefly studied at the State Higher Academy of Music in Kraków with Ewa Bukojemska. Having graduated from The Juilliard School in New York (Bachelor of Music degree, 1992; piano with Josef Raieff, then Jerome Lowenthal and chamber music with Joseph Fuchs), he moved on to obtain a Postgraduate Advanced Studies Diploma specializing in piano performance from the Royal Academy of Music in London (1997), with Martin Roscoe. He also worked with Dimitri Bashkirov (masterclasses held under auspices of the Queen Sofía College of Music in Spain) and Vera Gornostaeva in Paris and Moscow. Being an alumnus of the Music Academy of the West in Montecito, 1991, he holds a Diplome superieur de la langue et civilization francaise from Paris Sorbonne University (1994). In 1994 he received the Grand Prix of the Conservatoire International de Musique de Paris. He was nominated for the Molière award in 2010 (Best musical play: Diva à Sarcelles, written and directed by Virginie Lemoine).

== Performances ==
Kapustka has performed in Europe (2008 Europe's Day recital at Le Havre, France; recitals for the 2010 Chopin Year celebrations in France, 2011 Liszt Bicentenary concerts in Great Britain); USA - Lincoln Center appearances 1989-1992, Juilliard IBM concert series, Kosciuszko Foundation-Hunter College Music series broadcast live on WQXR New York classical radio, Carnegie Recital Hall 1997, United Nations on invitation from the Russian Permanent Mission 2004. In 2010 he initiated a Bach in Rio project, playing and recording selected Bach keyboard concerti with the Orquestra de Cordas da Grota in Rio de Janeiro, Brazil.

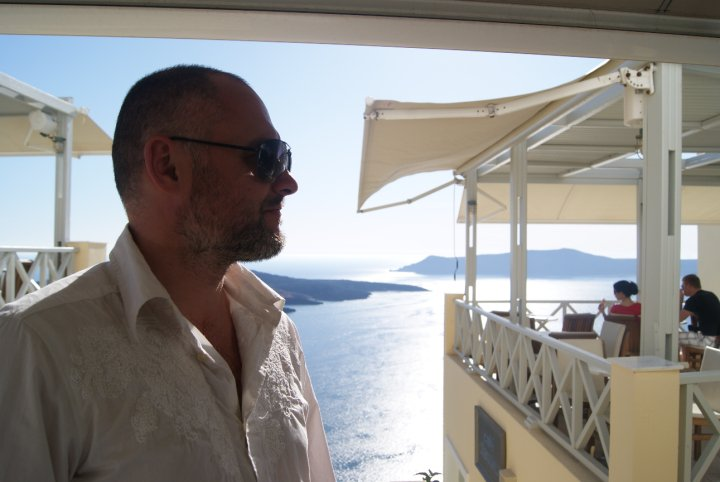
Jozef Kapustka in Greece, 2010

== Discography ==
- Jozef Kapustka:Improvisations with Bashir (DUX/Naxos 2013)
