= New York City Fire Department =

American municipal fire department

Fire Department of the City of New York
- FDNY logo

- Flag

Operational area
- Country: United States
- State: New York
- City: New York City

Agency overview
- Established: July 31, 1865; 161 years ago (origins go back to 1648; 378 years ago)
- Annual calls: For 2018: FDNY EMS total call volume: 1,862,159; FDNY fire suppression total call volume: 619,378; Structural fires: 27,053; Non-structural fires: 13,730; Non-fire emergencies: 256,560; Medical emergencies: 300,598; Malicious false alarms: 21,437
- Employees: 11,000 uniformed fire personnel; 4,500 uniformed EMS personnel (EMTs and paramedics); 2,000 civilian employees
- Annual budget: $2.64 billion (FY 2026)
- Staffing: Career
- Commissioner: Lillian Bonsignore
- Fire chief: John M. Esposito
- EMS level: Certified first responder-defibrillator (CFR-D), basic life support (BLS), and advanced life support (ALS)
- IAFF: 94, 854, and 4959
- Motto: "New York's Bravest"; EMS Motto: "New York's Best"

Facilities and equipment
- Divisions: 9
- Battalions: 49
- Stations: 254
- Engines: 197
- Trucks: 143
- Squads: 8
- Rescues: 5
- Ambulances: 450
- HAZMAT: 1
- USAR: 1
- Wildland: 10
- Fireboats: 3x year-round, 6x seasonal

Website
- Official website
- IAFF website (officers); IAFF website (firefighters); IAFF website (Fire Alarm Dispatchers)|

The Fire Department of the City of New York (FDNY), also known as the New York City Fire Department, is the full-service fire department of New York City. It is responsible for serving all five boroughs. The FDNY provides fire suppression services, hazardous materials response, emergency medical services, and technical rescue.

The New York City Fire Department is the largest municipal fire department in North America and the Western Hemisphere, as well as the second largest in the world after the Tokyo Fire Department. The FDNY employs over 11,000 uniformed firefighting employees, 4,500 uniformed EMTs, paramedics, and additional EMS employees, and 2,000 civilian employees. Its regulations are compiled in title 3 of the New York City Rules. The FDNY's motto is "New York's Bravest" for fire, and "New York's Best" for EMS. The FDNY serves more than 8.5 million residents within a 302-square-mile (780 km^{2}) area.

The FDNY headquarters is located at 9 MetroTech Center in Downtown Brooklyn, and the FDNY Fire Academy is located on Randalls Island. There are 3 International Association of Fire Fighters (IAFF) Locals: The Uniformed Firefighters Association is represented by IAFF Local 94. The Uniformed Fire Officers Association is represented by IAFF Local 854 and the Uniformed Fire Alarm Dispatchers Benevolent Association is represented by IAFF Local 4959. EMS is represented by DC 37 Locals 2507 for EMTs and paramedics and Local 3621 for officers.

== Organization ==
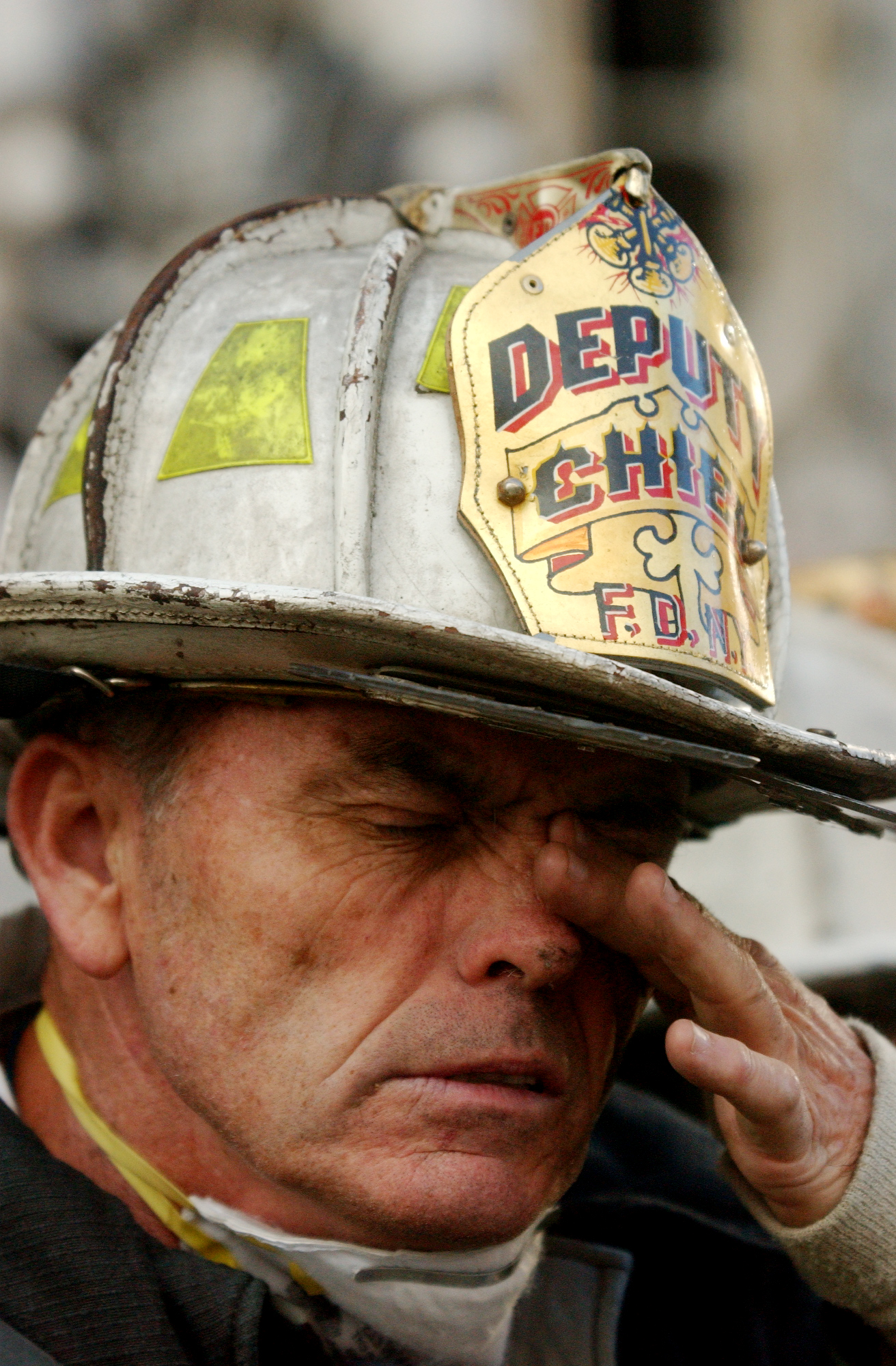
A FDNY deputy chief during rescue efforts at the World Trade Center following the September 11, 2001 attacks

Like most fire departments of major cities in the United States, the New York City Fire Department is organized in a paramilitary fashion, and in many cases, echoes the structure of the police department. The department's executive staff is divided into two areas that include a civilian fire commissioner who serves as the head of the department and a chief of department who serves as the operational leader. Responsible to the fire commissioner is the chief of staff, executive officer, chief of department, first deputy commissioner and the chief fire marshal. Responsible to the first deputy fire commissioner are civilian deputies and assistant commissioners who are responsible for the many administrative bureaus within the department. Under the chief of department is the chief of fire operations, chief of EMS operations, chief of training, chief of fire prevention, chief of safety & inspectional services and the chief of counterterrorism.

Geographically, the department is organized into five borough commands for each of the five boroughs of New York City. Each borough command has a borough commander. In Manhattan, the borough commander is an assistant chief and is supported by a deputy borough commander holding the rank of deputy assistant chief, whereas each of the other four borough commanders are deputy assistant chiefs. Within those five borough commands exists nine firefighting divisions, each of which are headed by a division commander, who has several deputy chiefs to help run the division when the division commander is not on duty. Within each division are four to seven battalions, each led by a battalion chief. The lead battalion chief for the battalion is the battalion commander and the others are battalion chiefs. Each battalion consists of three to eight firehouses and consists of approximately 180–200 firefighters and officers. Each firehouse consists of one to three fire companies. Each fire company is led by a captain, who commands three lieutenants and twelve to twenty firefighters. Tours can be either night tours (6 p.m. – 9 a.m.) or day tours (9 a.m. – 6 p.m.). Under a swapping system called "mutuals", most firefighters combine tours and work a 24-hour shift, followed by three days off. In one tour or shift, each company is commanded by an officer (lieutenant or captain) and is made up of four to five firefighters for engine companies, five firefighters for ladder companies, rescue companies, or squad companies, and six firefighters for the hazardous materials company.

== History ==
=== 1648–1865 ===
The origins of the New York City Fire Department go back to 1648 when the first fire ordinance was adopted in what was then the Dutch settlement of New Amsterdam. Peter Stuyvesant, within one year of his arrival, appointed four fire wardens to wooden chimneys of thatched-roofed wooden houses, charging a penalty to owners whose chimneys were improperly swept. The first four fire wardens were Martin Krieger, Thomas Hall, Adrian Wyser, and George Woolsey.

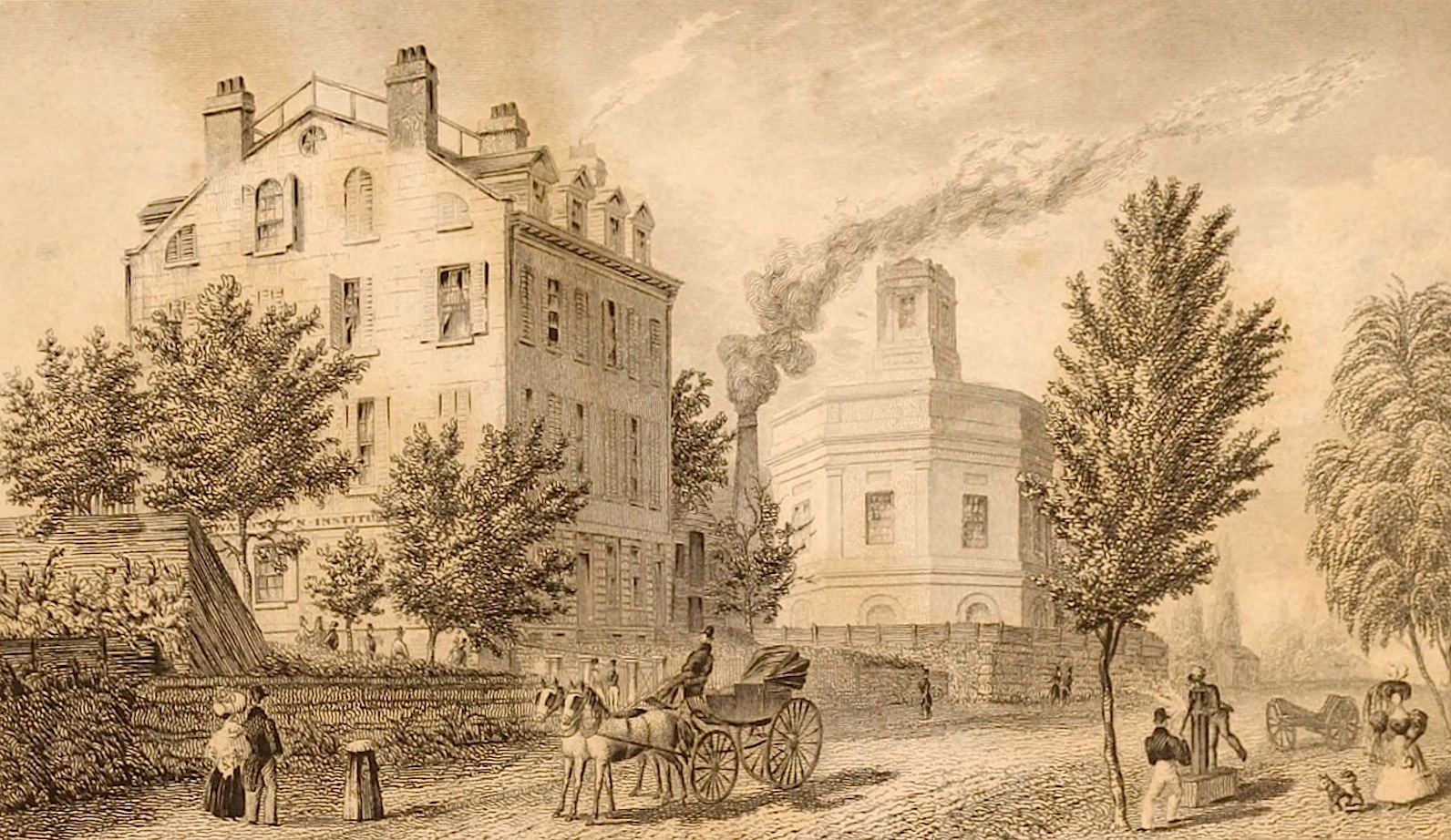
First firefighting reservoir, behind school, 1831

Hooks, ladders and buckets were financed through the collection of fines for dirty chimneys, and a fire watch was established, consisting of eight wardens which were drawn from the male population. An organisation known as the prowlers but given the nickname the rattle watch patrolled the streets with buckets, ladders and hooks from nine in the evening until dawn looking for fires. Leather shoe buckets, 250 in all, were manufactured by local Dutch shoemakers in 1658, and these bucket brigades are regarded as the beginning of the New York Fire Department.

In 1664, New Amsterdam became an English settlement and was renamed New York. The first New York fire brigade entered service in 1731 equipped with two hand-drawn pumpers which had been transported from London, England. These two pumpers formed Engine Company 1 and Engine Company 2. These were the first fire engines to be used in the American colonies, and all able-bodied citizens were required to respond to a fire alarm and to participate in the extinguishing under the supervision of the Aldermen.

The city's first firehouse was built in 1736 in front of City Hall on Broad Street. A year later, on December 16, 1737, the colony's General Assembly created the Volunteer Fire Department of the City of New York, appointing 30 men who would remain on call in exchange for exemption from jury and militia duty. The city's first official firemen were required to be "able, discreet, and sober men who shall be known as Firemen of the City of New York, to be ready for service by night and by day and be diligent, industrious and vigilant." Although the 1737 Act created the basis of the fire department, the actual legal entity was incorporated in the State of New York on March 20, 1798, under the name of "Fire Department, City of New York."

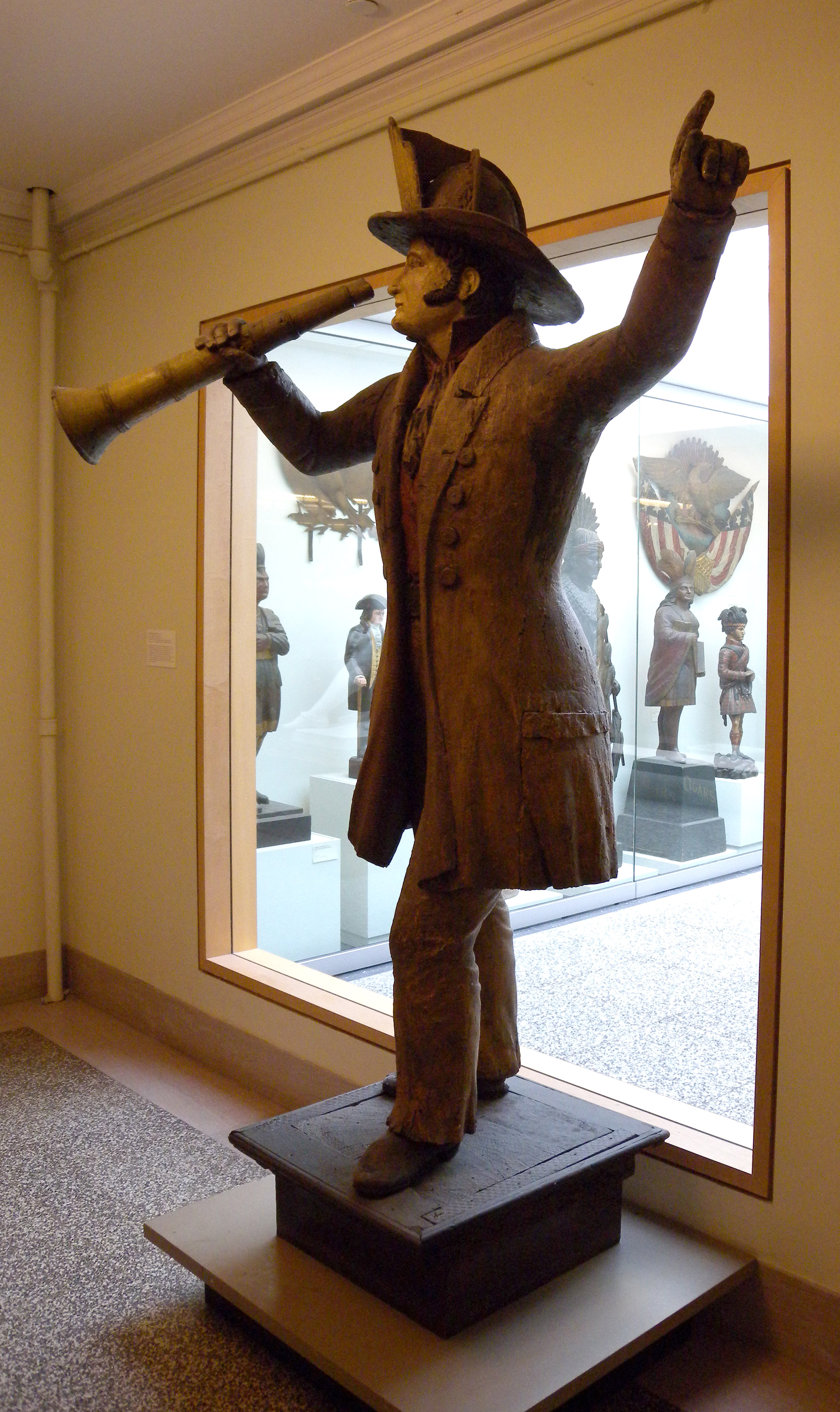
Mid-19th-century Chief

The city's oldest fire company still in operation was organized July 10, 1772, as Hook and Ladder Co. 1. The company was disbanded in 1776 when the British Army invaded Manhattan following the Continental Army's loss at the Battle of Brooklyn and the resulting loss of Manhattan after the Landing at Kip's Bay, and most of the firefighters making up the company fled the city. Following the British Evacuation of New York in November 1783, on June 16, 1784, Mutual Hook and Ladder 1 was reorganized. The company operated continuously during the volunteer fire department days, and on the organization of the Paid System, Hook and Ladder Company No.1 was created September 8, 1865, using the same location, the same truck and the same red cap fronts as Mutual Hook and Ladder No.1 did, and nine of her twelve members had served in the old company. It was the only company that was continued with the same number and location, and might be said that Hook and Ladder Company No. 1 has had a continuous existence since June 16, 1784. The company has moved firehouses several times since its inception, and has been housed at 100 Duane Street in Tribeca since December 31, 1905, with Engine 7 and Battalion 1. The company later became the first Tower Ladder company in the city in 1964, and is now known as Ladder 1.

In 1845, the last great fire to affect Manhattan began early in the morning and was subdued that afternoon. The fire killed four firefighters, 26 civilians, and destroyed 345 buildings.

=== 1865–1898 ===
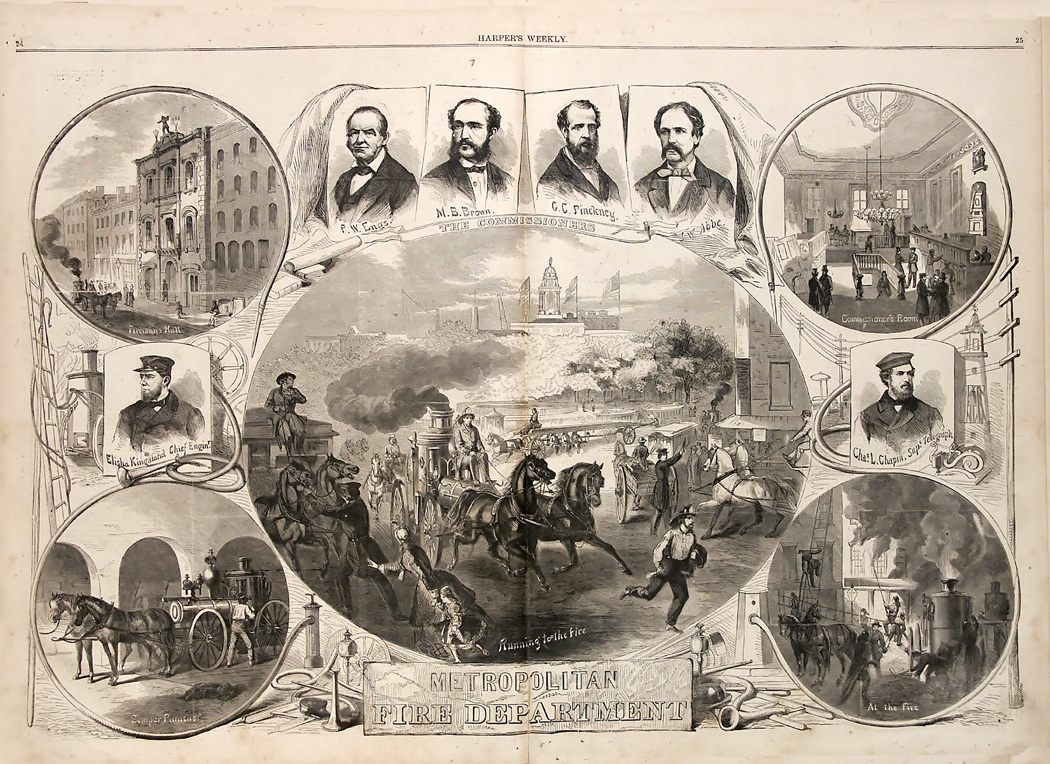
Original sheet celebrating the official formation of the Metropolitan Fire Department, 1866

In 1865, the volunteer fire department was abolished by a state act which created the Metropolitan Fire District and the Metropolitan Fire Department (MFD). This effectively gave control of the fire departments in the cities of New York and Brooklyn to the Governor who appointed his Board of Commissioners. There was never any effective incorporation of the fire departments of the two cities during this period. It wasn't until the Greater City of New York was consolidated in 1898 that the two were combined under one common organization or organizational structure. The change met with a mixed reaction from the citizens, and some of the eliminated volunteers became bitter and resentful, which resulted in both political battles and street fights. The insurance companies in the city, however, finally won the battle and had the volunteers replaced with paid firefighters. The members of the paid fire department were primarily selected from the prior volunteers. All of the volunteer's apparatus, including their fire houses, were seized by the state who made use of them to form the new organization and form the basis of the current FDNY. The MFD lasted until 1870 when the Tweed Charter ended state control in the city. As a result, a new Board of Fire Commissioners was created and the original name of the Fire Department City of New York (FDNY) was reinstated.

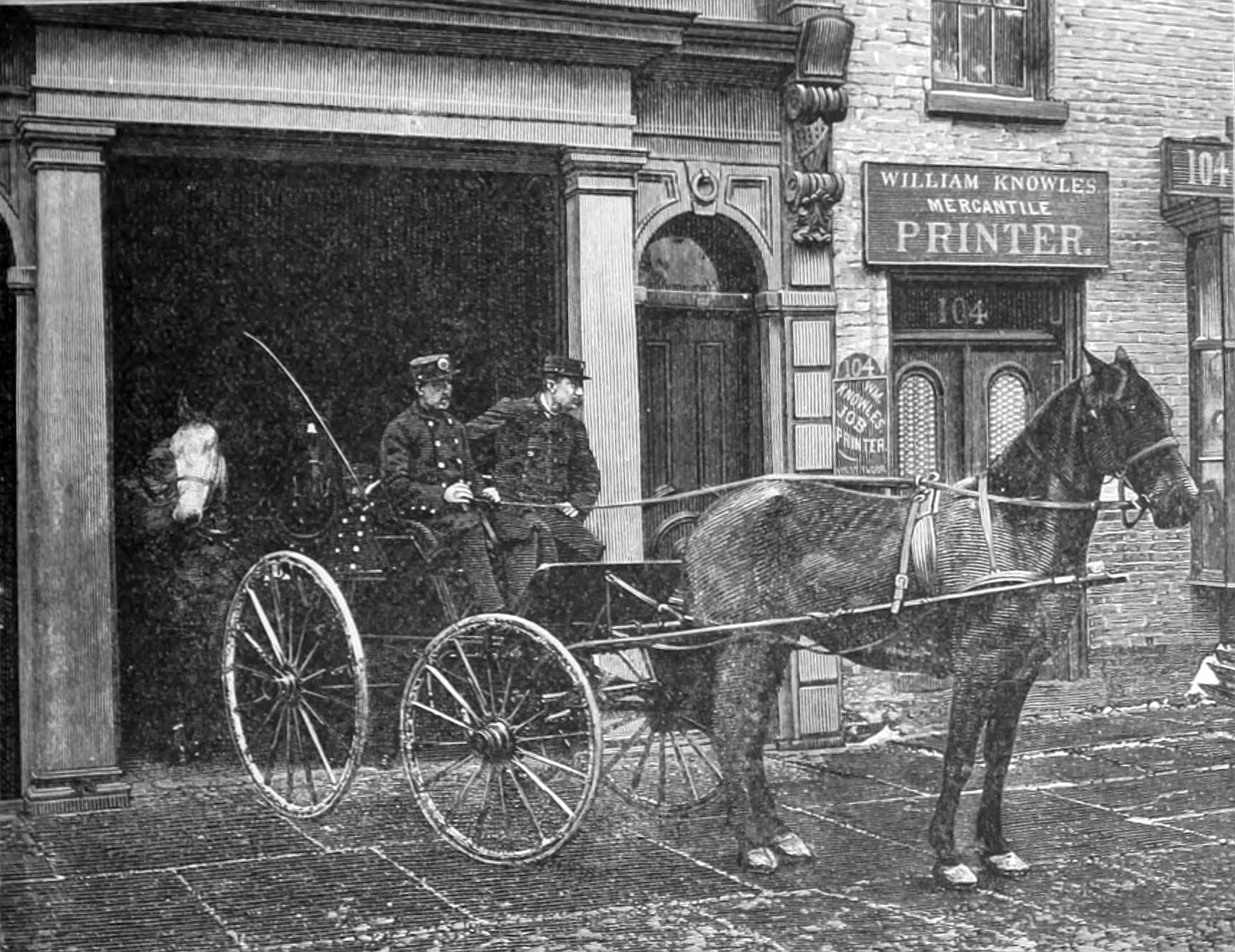
Battalion Chief John J. Bresnan (left) answering a call in 1887. While leading men into a building fire in 1894, Bresnan became trapped and suffocated when a roof collapsed. It was stated: "no braver, abler or more conscientious man than John J. Bresnan ever drew a paycheck in the service of the City of New York."

Initially, the paid fire service only covered present day Manhattan, until the act of 1865 which united Brooklyn with Manhattan to form the Metropolitan District. The same year the fire department consisted of 13 Chief Officers and 552 Company Officers and firemen. The officers and firemen worked a continuous tour of duty, with three hours a day off for meals and one day off a month, and were paid salaries according to their rank or grade. 1865 also saw the first adoption of regulations, although they were fairly strict and straitlaced. Following several large fires in 1866 (which resulted in excessive fire losses and a rise in insurance rates), the fire department was reorganized under the command of General Alexander Shaler, and with military discipline the paid department reached its full potential which resulted in a general reduction in fire losses. In 1870, the merit system of promotion in the Fire Department was established. Southwestern Westchester County (which would later become the western Bronx) was annexed by New York in 1874; as a result, the volunteers there were phased out and replaced by the paid department. This pattern was repeated as City services expanded elsewhere.

=== 1898–1965 ===
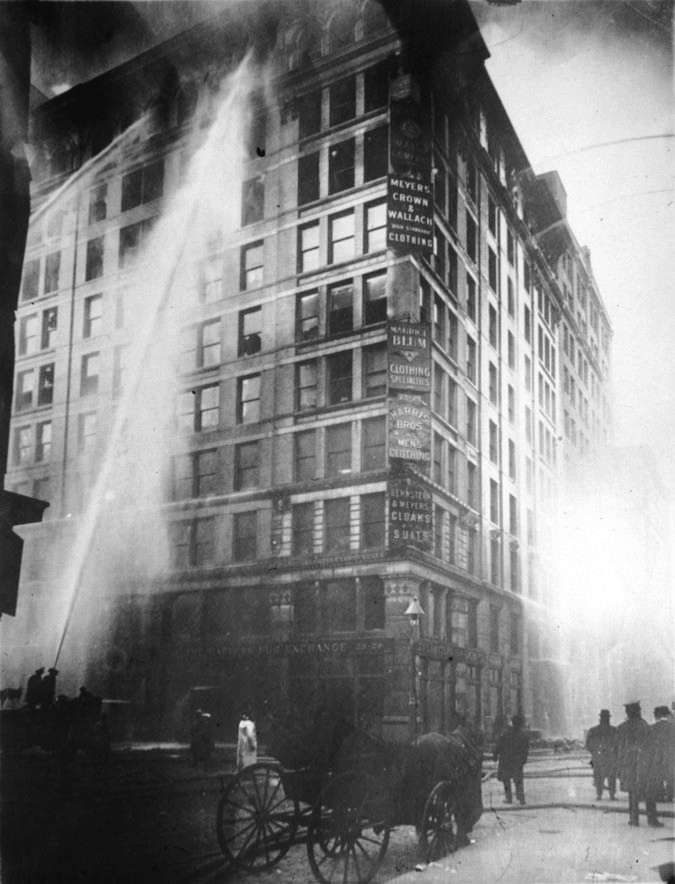
The Triangle Shirtwaist Factory fire on March 25, 1911

On January 1, 1898, the different areas of New York were consolidated, which ushered the Fire Department into a new era. All the fire forces in the various sections were brought under the unified command of the first Commissioner in the history of the Fire Department. This same year, Richmond (now Staten Island) became a part of the City of New York. However, the volunteer units there remained in place until they were gradually replaced by paid units in 1915, 1928, 1932 and 1937, when only two volunteer units remained, Oceanic Hook & Ladder Vol Engine and Richmond Fire.

The unification of the Fire Department, which took place in 1898, would pave the way for many changes. In 1909, the Fire Department received its first piece of motorized fire apparatus. On March 25, 1911, a fire in the Triangle Shirtwaist Company killed 146 workers, most of whom were young female immigrants. Later the same year the fire college was formed to train new fire fighters, and on May 1, 1913, the Bureau of Fire Prevention was created.

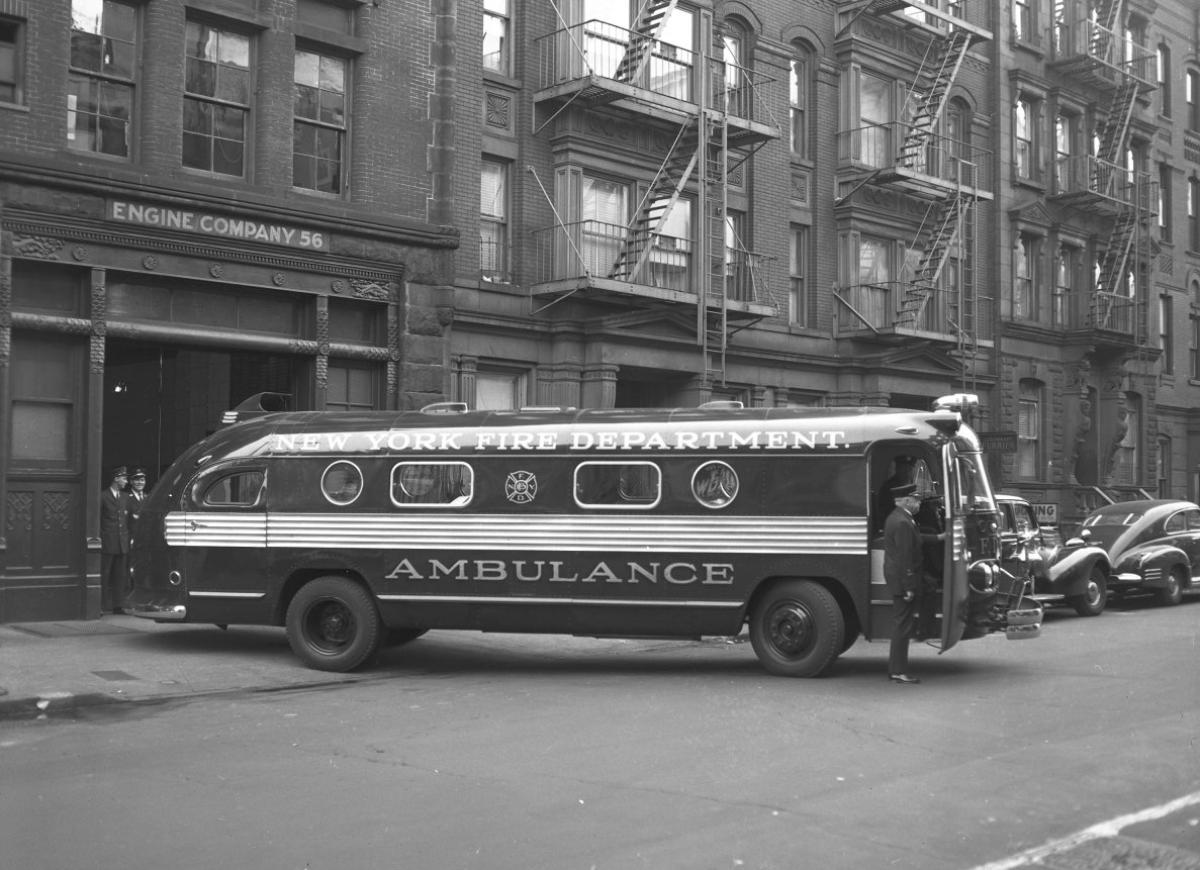
An FDNY ambulance in 1949

In 1919, the Uniformed Firefighters Association was formed. Tower ladders and the SuperPumper System were introduced in 1965. Major apparatus of the SuperPumper System (the SuperPumper and the SuperTender) was phased out in 1982, in favor of the Maxi-Water Unit. The 5 Satellite Units of the system, together with the Maxi-Water Unit (known as Satellite 6 since 1999) are still actively used as of 2026 for multiple alarm fires and certain other incidents, primarily to assist relaying water to an incident and to operate the manifold system. These are now called the Satellite Water System. Other technical advances included the introduction of high pressure water systems, the creation of a Marine fleet, adoption of vastly improved working conditions and the utilization of improved radio communications.

=== 1965–1996 ===
During the late 1960s and early 1970s (a period commonly referred to within municipal history as the "War Years") the FDNY experienced an increase in structural fires, false alarms, and civil distress across economically disadvantaged neighborhoods, including Central Brooklyn, Harlem, and the South Bronx. In response, Mayor John V. Lindsay’s administration leveraged President Lyndon B. Johnson’s federal Great Society initiative to establish the Joint Fire Department / Model Cities Program. Active primarily between 1968 and 1974, the initiative sought to address public safety, fire prevention, and community outreach in target areas such as Bedford-Stuyvesant, Brownsville, East New York, Harlem, and the South Bronx.

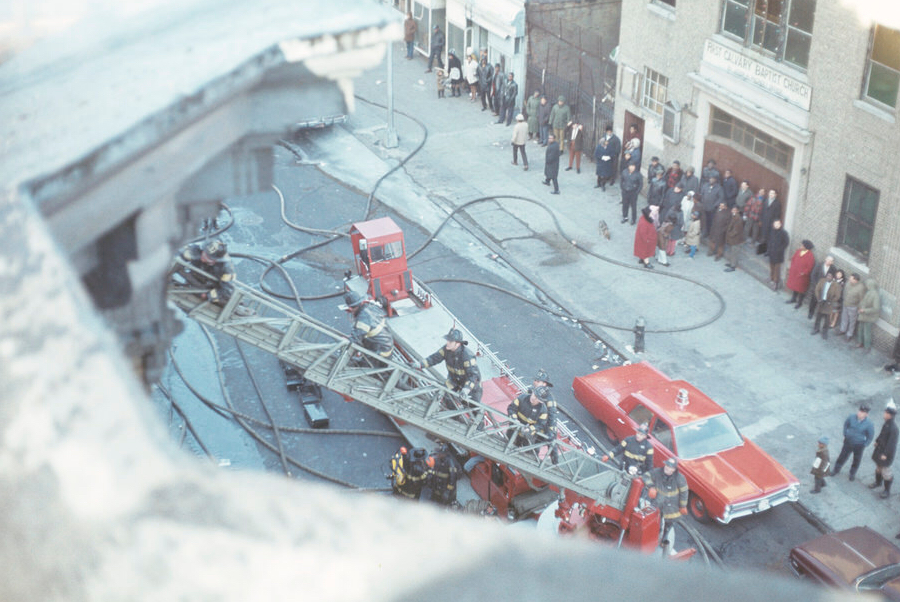
FDNY in January 1969

On November 23, 1965, incoming Mayor Lindsay announced the appointment of Robert O. Lowery as Fire Commissioner of the New York City Fire Department. His was the first commissioner level appointment announced by the Mayor-elect. Lowery, who was the first African American to serve as a Fire Commissioner of a major U.S. city, served in that position for more than seven years until his resignation on September 29, 1973, in order to campaign for then-Controller Abraham D. Beame, the Democratic candidate for Mayor.

In 1977, the New York City Fire Department announced that women could take the exam to become firefighters. After passing the written portion of the exam, Brenda Berkman and 89 other women subsequently failed the physical portion. It was stated by an official that their physical test was "the most difficult the department had ever administered, [and] was designed more to keep women out than to accurately assess job-related skills." After Berkman's requests for a fairer test were ignored, she filed an ultimately successful class-action lawsuit: Brenda Berkman, et al. v. The City of New York (1982). A new test was created in which standards were changed so the test was job-related and Berkman with about 40 other women passed to enter the fire academy in 1982. (See Brenda Berkman, et al. v. The City of New York, CV-79-1813, 536 F. Supp. 177 (E.D.N.Y. 1982), aff'd Berkman v. City of New York, 705 F.2d 584 (2d Cir. 1983.))

The Waldbaum's supermarket fire was a major fire on August 2, 1978, in Sheepshead Bay, Brooklyn, New York that killed six FDNY firefighters.

=== 1996-2001 ===
On March 17, 1996, Mayor Rudy Giuliani merged the emergency medical services of the NYC Health and Hospitals Corporation into the FDNY.

==== September 11 attacks ====
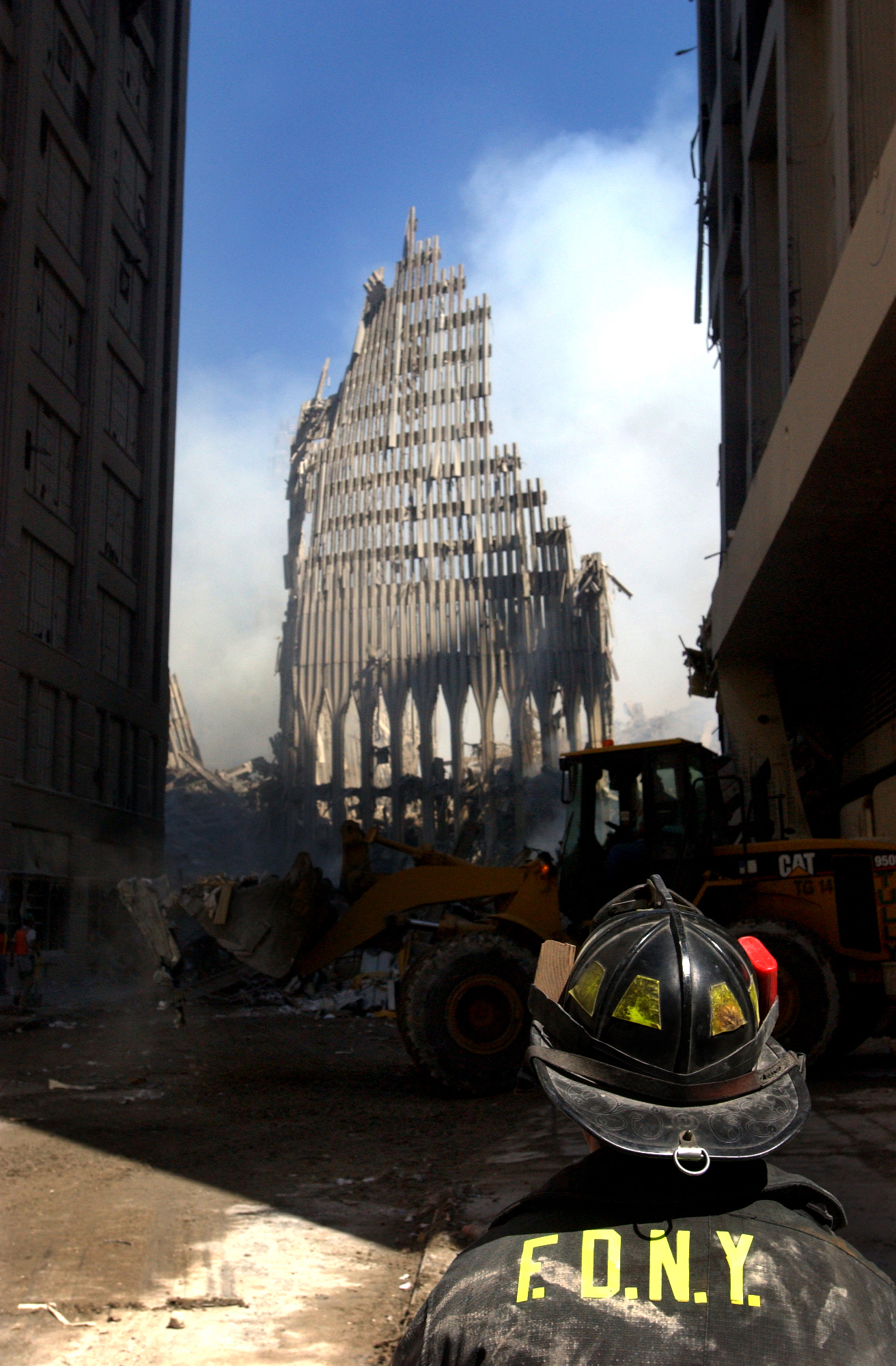
A New York City firefighter looks up at what remains of the World Trade Center after its collapse during the September 11 attacks.

On September 11, 2001, American Airlines Flight 11 and United Airlines Flight 175 were hijacked by two separate groups of Islamic terrorists affiliated with al-Qaeda and flown into the World Trade Center's North and South Towers respectively, causing massive damage to both towers during impact, and starting fires that caused the weakened 110-story skyscrapers to collapse within less than two hours.

FDNY fire companies and EMS crews were deployed to the World Trade Center minutes after Flight 11 struck the north tower. Chief officers set up a command center in the lobby as first arriving units entered the tower and firefighters began climbing the stairs. A mobile command center was also set up outside on Vesey Street, but was destroyed when the towers collapsed. A command post was then set up at a firehouse in Greenwich Village. The FDNY deployed 121 engine companies, 62 truck companies, all five rescue companies, six squad companies, 27 Chief Officers, along with many other units to the site, with more than 1,000 firefighters, EMTs and paramedics were on the scene when the towers collapsed.

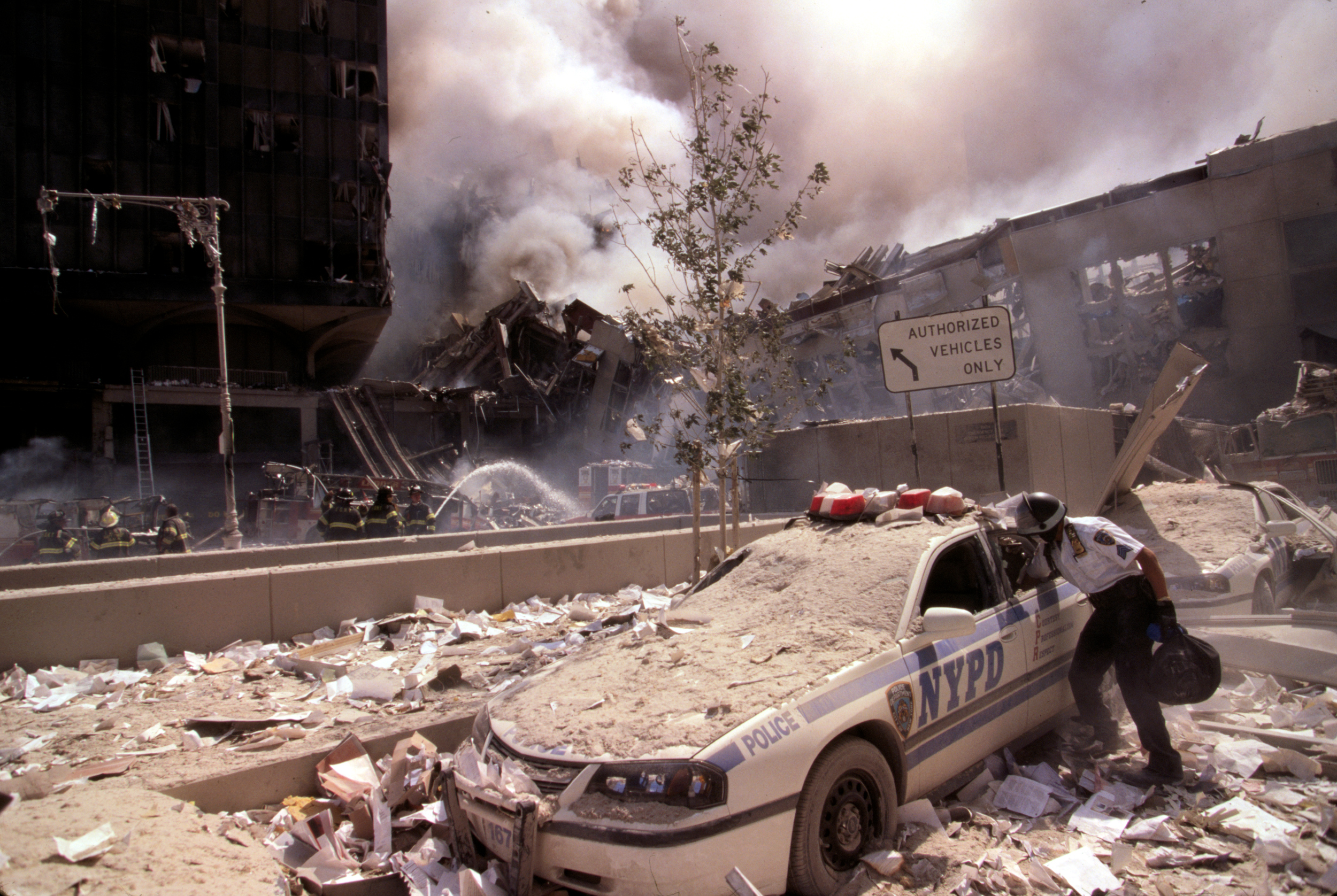
NYPD Sergeant searching through a cruiser covered in debris

Many firefighters arrived at the World Trade Center without meeting at the command centers. Problems with radio communication caused commanders to lose contact with many of the firefighters who went into the towers; those firefighters were unable to hear evacuation orders. There was practically no communication with the New York City Police Department, which had helicopters at the scene. When the towers collapsed, hundreds were trapped within and 343 fire department members along with 1 fire patrolman were killed. The fatalities included First Deputy Commissioner William M. Feehan, Chief of Department Peter Ganci, Department Chaplain Mychal Judge, Battalion Chief Orio Palmer and Fire Marshal Ronald Paul Bucca. Hundreds of firefighter funerals were held in the weeks to follow, including 16 in one day on Saturday, September 29, 2001.

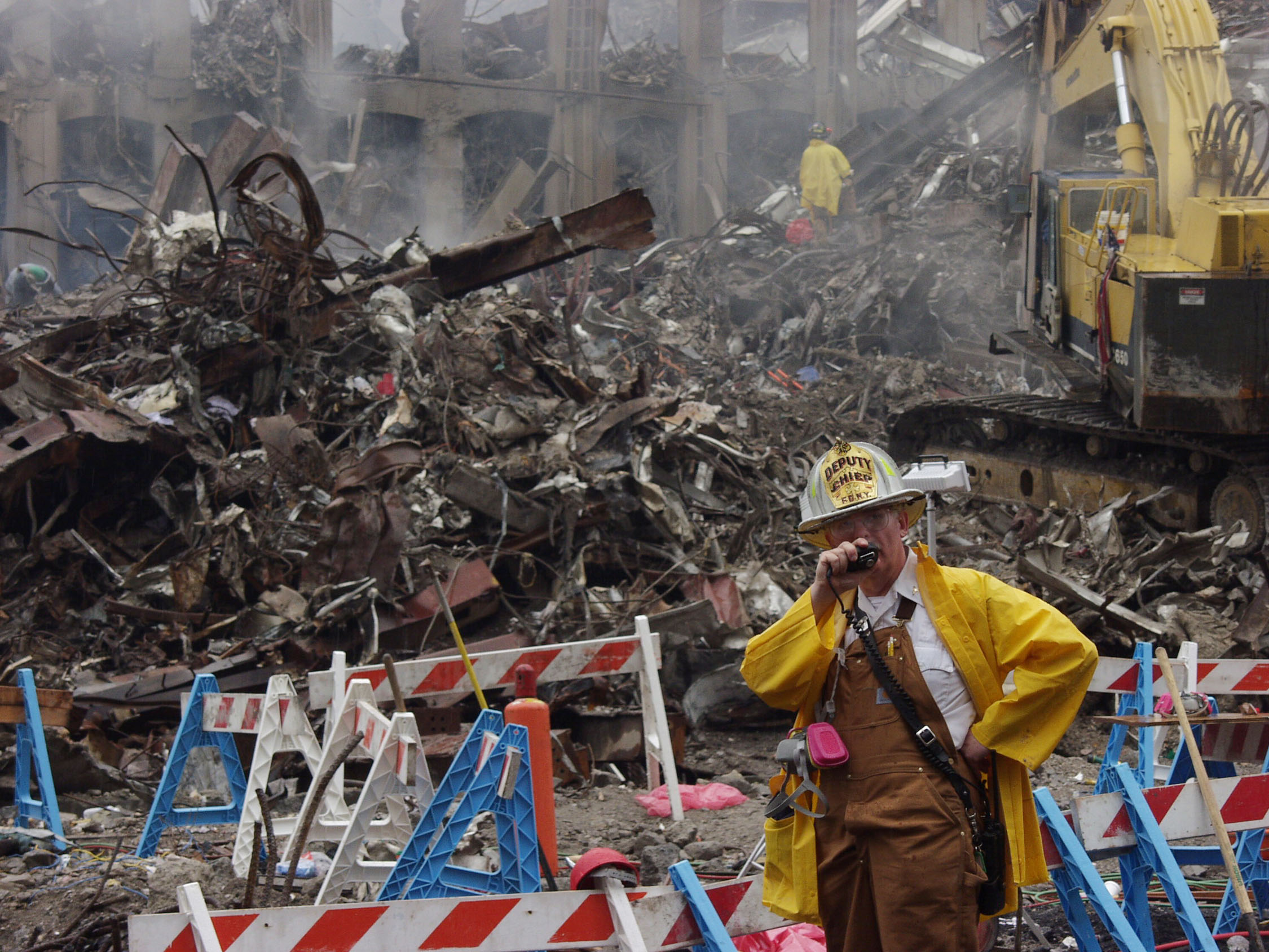
A New York City Deputy chief coordinates the recovery effort underway at the World Trade Center.

Following the attacks, citywide fire response times that day rose by just one minute, to an average of 5.5 minutes. Many of the surviving firefighters continued to work alternating 24-hour shifts during the rescue and recovery effort, and they were joined by other firefighters and EMS personnel from hundreds of miles around New York City. Among the arriving units were career and volunteer personnel from Upstate New York, Long Island, Connecticut, New Jersey, Pennsylvania, Maryland, and Florida.

=== 2002–present ===
In the aftermath of the September 11 attacks in 2001, the Fire Department has rebuilt itself and continues to serve the people of New York. During the Northeast Blackout of 2003, FDNY was called on to rescue hundreds of people from stranded elevators in approximately 800 Manhattan high-rise office and apartment buildings. The entire fire department was held over from the day tour to almost double the total force to 3,401 firefighters to handle the many fires which resulted, reportedly from people using candles for light.

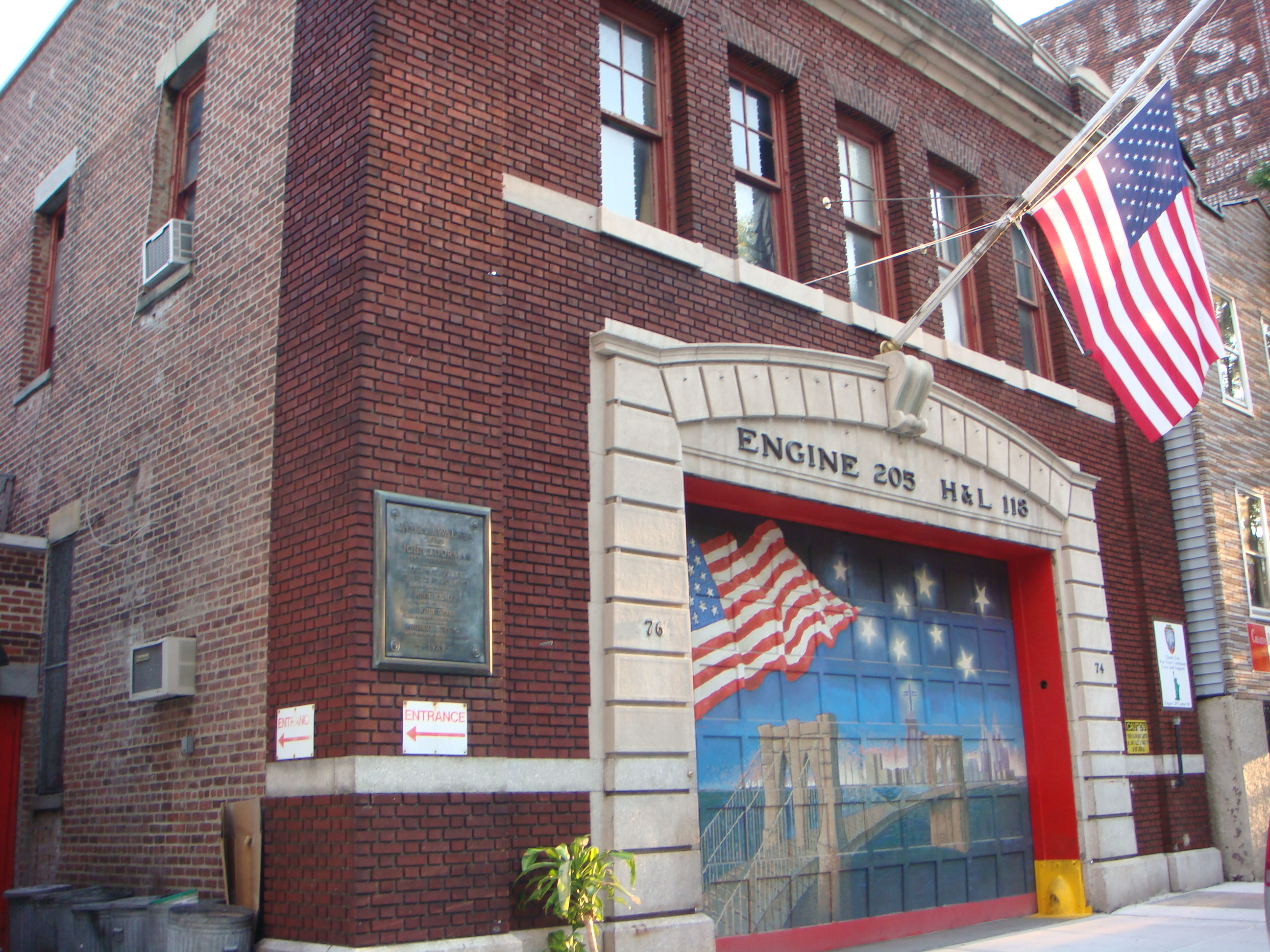
A typical New York City firehouse. Pictured is the Brooklyn quarters of Engine Co. 205 and Ladder Co. 118, depicting a mural dedicated to firefighters lost on 9/11.

At the beginning of the 21st century, there were 11,400 uniformed fire officers and firefighters under the command of the Chief of Department. The New York City Fire Department also employed 2800 Emergency Medical Technicians, Paramedics and Supervisors assigned to Department's EMS Command, and 1200 civilian employees.

In 2003, Mayor Bloomberg ordered the closure of six Engine Companies, four in Brooklyn (Engine 204, Engine 209, Engine 212, Engine 278), one in Manhattan (Engine 36), and one in Queens (Engine 261).

In 2015, after the 2015 Tianjin Explosions, the FDNY put their flags at half mast in condolence to the Chinese firefighters killed.

In 2019, Lillian Bonsignore became the first openly gay and the first female chief of EMS Operations for the FDNY. Bonsignore is the current commissioner of the FDNY, appointed by Zohran Mamdani after Mark Guerra was appointed by Former Mayor Eric Adams following Robert Tucker's resignation in December 2025. Tucker was preceded by Laura Kavanagh.

==== Allegations of race discrimination ====
The FDNY has faced and settled numerous discrimination lawsuits alleging that the FDNY engages in a culture where racial minorities face hiring and promotion discrimination. In 2014, the City of New York made a $98 million discrimination settlement for a lawsuit brought by the Vulcan Society, an African-American firefighter fraternal organization. There have also been investigations concerning FDNY firefighters engaging in bullying and harassing behavior of Muslim firefighters including behavior such as firefighters trying to slip pork products, which are prohibited under Islamic law, into the food of Muslim firefighters. In another case, the son of a former FDNY commissioner was hired as a firefighter despite allegedly making anti-Semitic comments.

== Ideology and core competencies ==
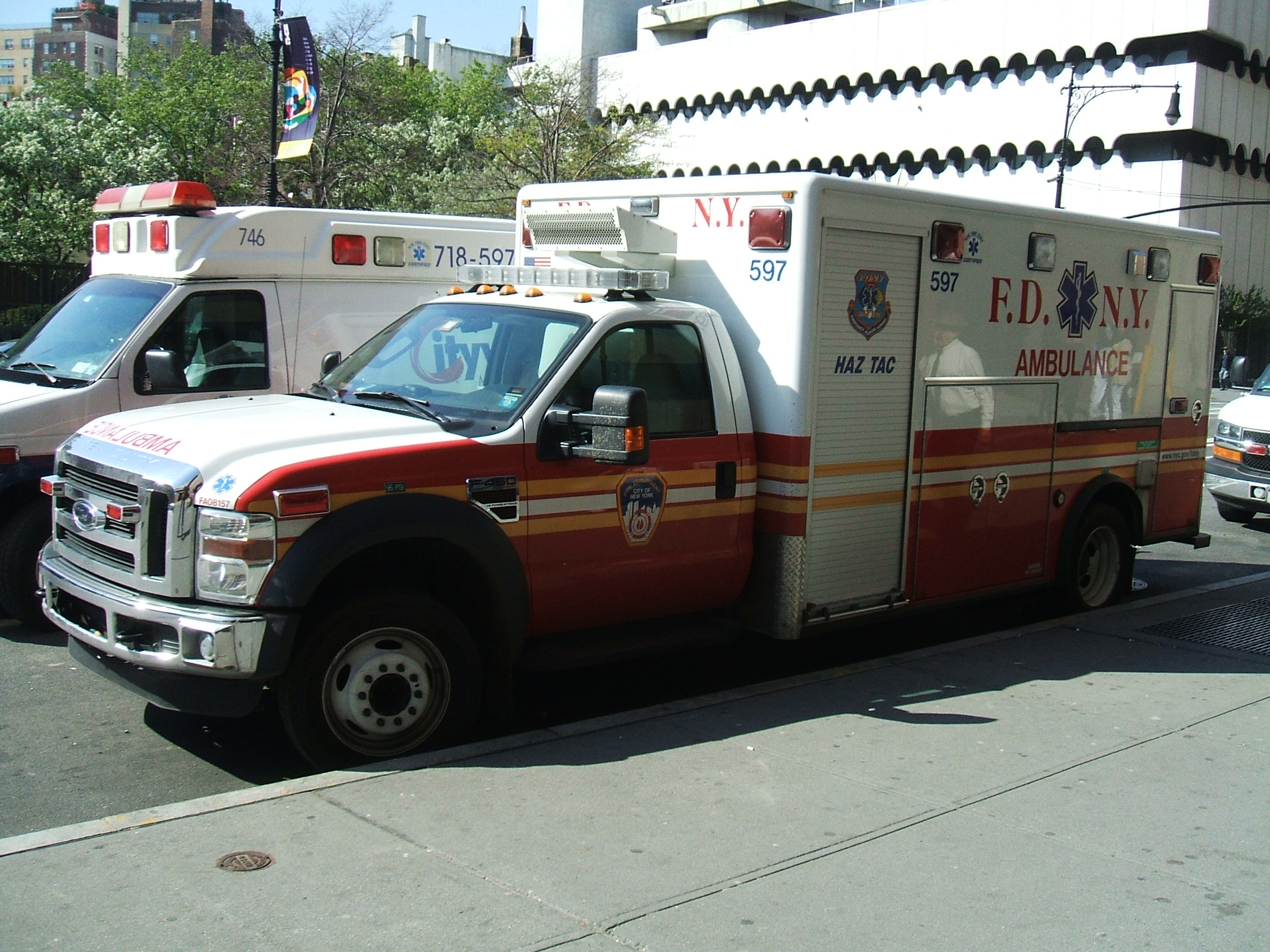
An 2008 Ford F-450 FDNY Haz-Tac Ambulance

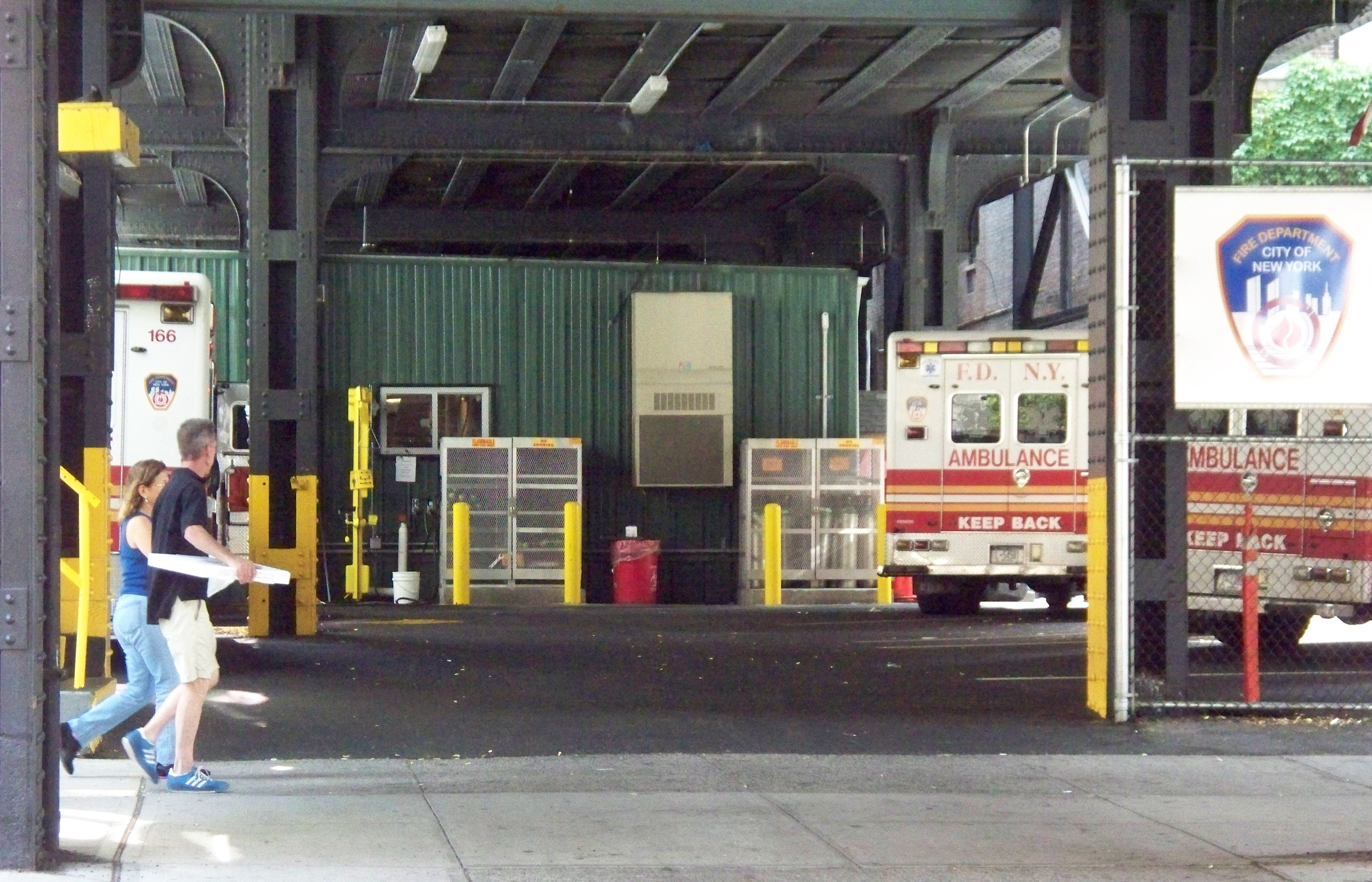
FDNY EMS station 7

The FDNY derives its name from the Tweed Charter which created the Fire Department of the City of New York. This is in contrast to most other fire departments in the U.S. where the name of the city precedes the words fire department.

=== Ideology ===
- The FDNY ideology of aggressive interior fire attack grew naturally out of the building and population density that characterize the city.
- The contribution of Irish and Italian Americans to the FDNY dates back to the formation of the paid fire department. During the Civil War, New York's Irish and Italian firefighters were the backbone of the 11th New York Volunteer Infantry Regiment (New York Fire Zouaves), a highly decorated unit.
- Members of the FDNY have the nickname "New York's Bravest."
- Members of the FDNY EMS have the nickname "New York's Best."
- In addition to firefighting, technical rescue, and hazardous materials mitigation, FDNY stations ambulances throughout the city, and supplies paramedics and EMTs.

Together with ambulances run by certain participating hospitals (locally known as voluntaries, not to be confused with volunteers) and private companies, it is known as the FDNY EMS Command, which is the largest pre-hospital care provider in the world, responding to over 1.5 million calls each year. All of the FDNY EMS Command members are also trained to the HAZMAT Operations level. A select group of 39 EMS units (18 BLS and 21 ALS) are known as Hazardous Material Tactical Units. Haz-Tac Ambulance members are trained to the level of Hazardous Materials Technician, which allows them to provide emergency medical care and decontamination in hazardous environments, in addition to their normal pre-hospital duties. Of these 39, eleven are also Rescue Paramedic Ambulances, whose crews are additionally trained for: Confined Space Rescue, Trench Rescue, Crush Injuries, and Building Collapse Rescues. Both the Rescue Medics and Haztac units operate with additional, exclusive protocols and specialized medical equipment.

=== Core competencies ===
A citywide Incident Management System plan released by the Office of the Mayor on May 14, 2004, set forth several "core competencies," which determine which agency has the authority to direct operations. FDNY core competencies include:

- Fire suppression
- Pre-hospital emergency medical care
- Search and rescue
- Structural evacuation
- CBRNE/HAZMAT life safety and mass decontamination
- Cause and origin, and arson investigations
- Fire prevention inspections

== Training ==
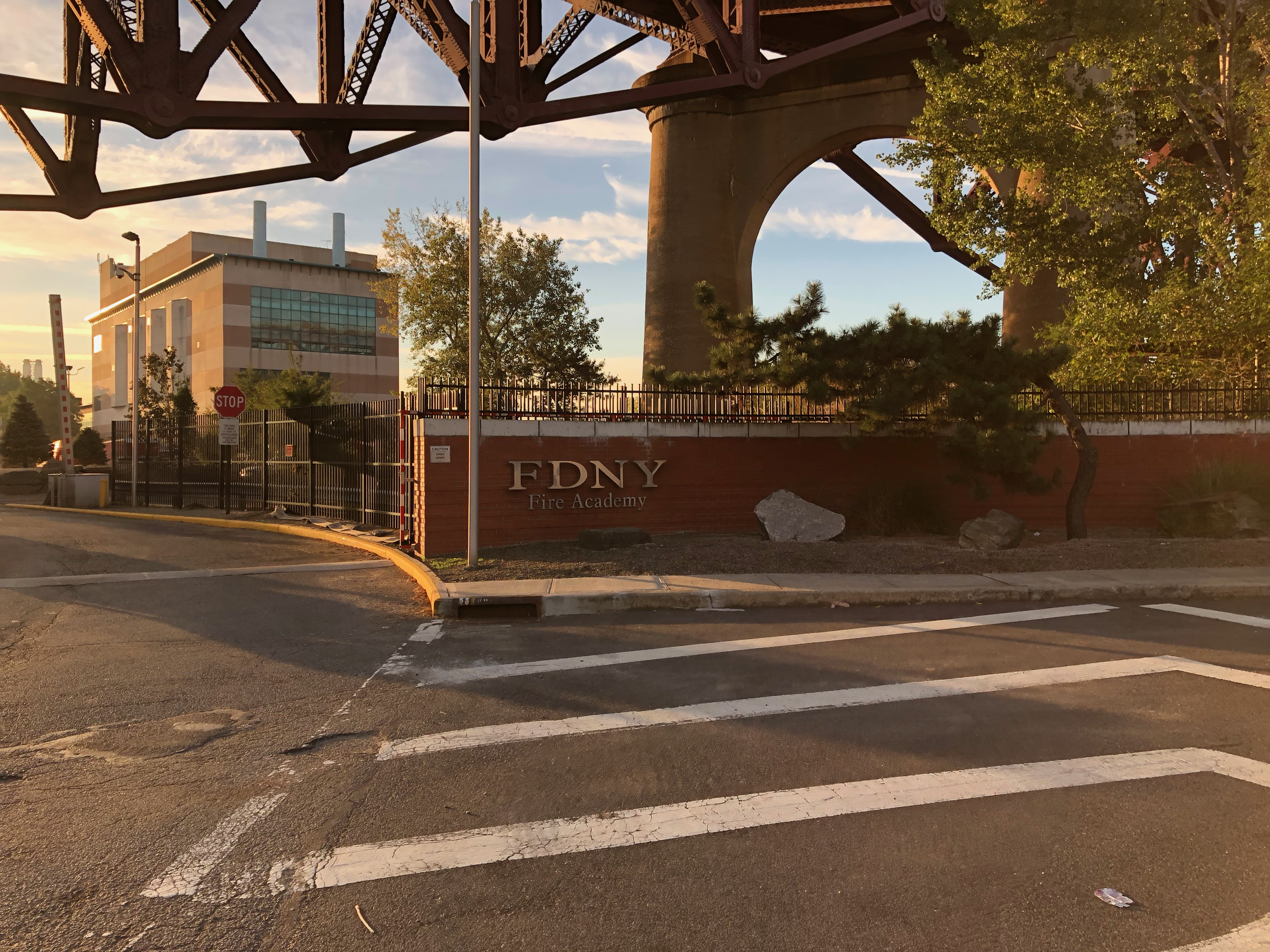
FDNY Fire Academy entrance on Randall's Island

Located at the Training Academy on Randall's Island, the Bureau of Training is responsible for all firefighter training needs for the Fire Department of New York. Initial training of all firefighter candidates undergo an 18-week academy that consists of classroom education and physical fitness performance. EMS training occurs at The FDNY EMS Academy located at Fort Totten (Queens) where EMT training is 13–18 weeks and paramedic training is 9 months.

== Communications ==
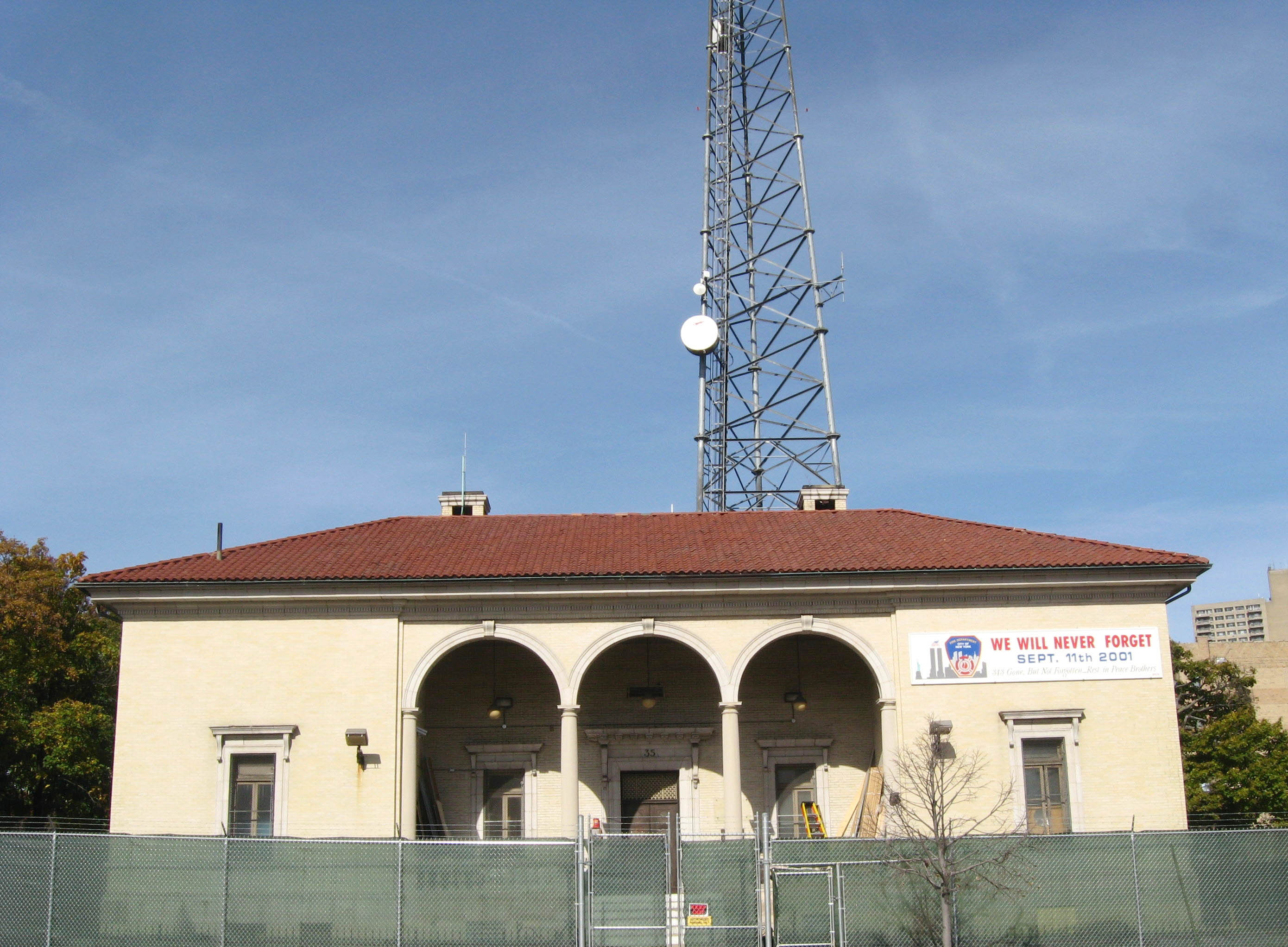
The former FDNY Brooklyn Communications Dispatch Office

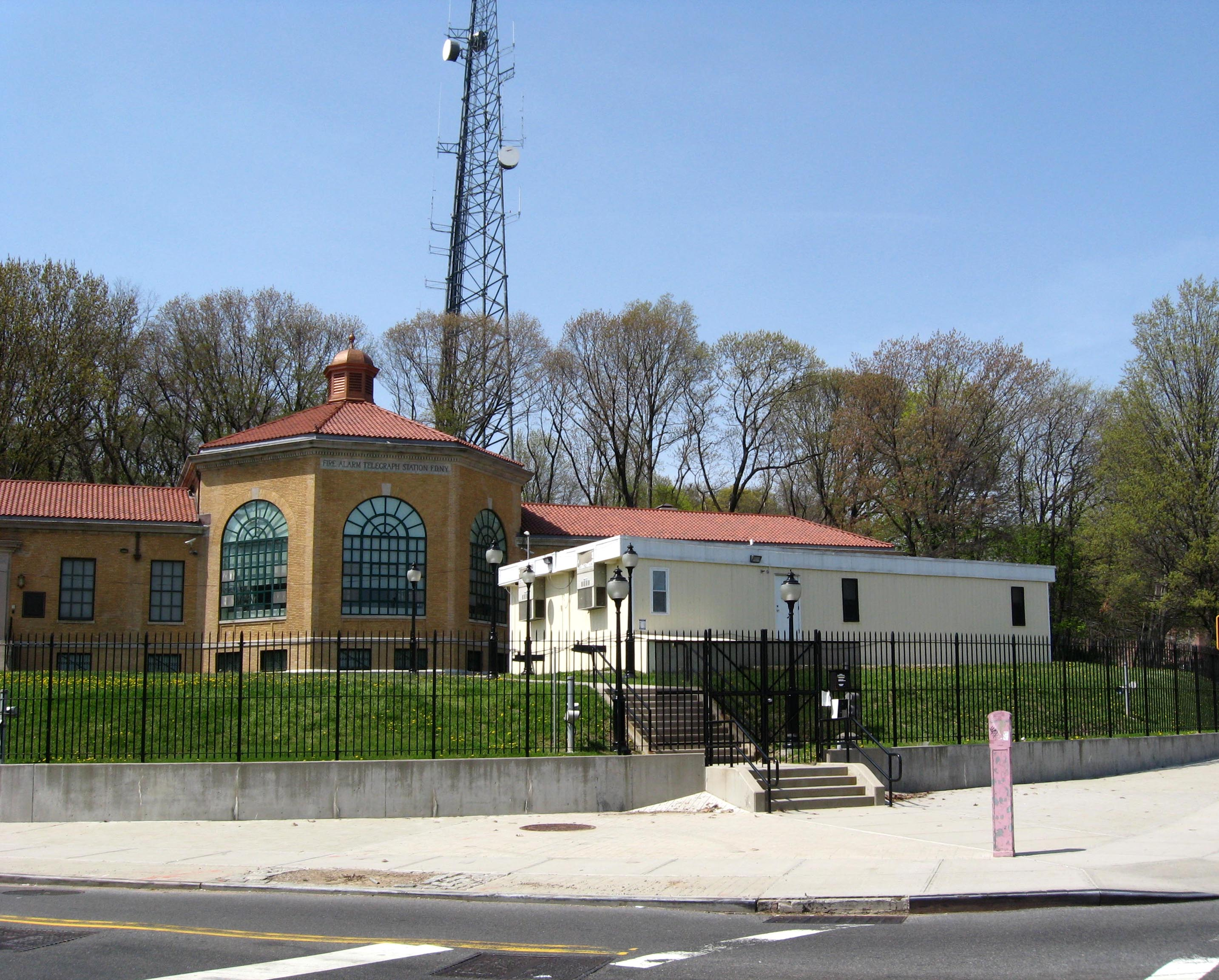
The former FDNY Queens Communications Dispatch Office in Woodhaven, Queens

There are two Bureau of Fire Communications Dispatch Offices: Public Safety Answering Center 1 (PSAC 1) is located at 11 Metrotech Center, Brooklyn, and Public Safety Answering Center 2 (PSAC 2) is located at 350 Marconi Street, Bronx. PSAC 1 covers Brooklyn, Staten Island and Citywide which is part of the Joint Operation Center as of October 2020. PSAC 2 covers the Bronx, Manhattan and Queens.

An initial call to an FDNY Communications Dispatch Office is taken by the Alarm Receipt Dispatcher (ARD), who speaks with the caller in order to determine the nature of the emergency. The ARD interrogates the caller to ascertain pertinent information and processes it into the Starfire computer system, which generates an incident and provides a recommended fire department resource response based on the information provided. This information is automatically sent to the Decision Dispatcher (DD).

When the Decision Dispatcher has made a decision as to what units will actually be assigned to the incident, unless the supervisor intervenes, the dispatcher releases the incident with assigned companies. An alarm is routed to the assigned companies, both in their respective firehouses and to the individual mobile data terminals (MDT), of each company's apparatus when it is in the field, depending on where the Starfire computer shows them to be situated. If a company/unit in a firehouse does not acknowledge the run within 30 seconds, the computer will notify the Voice Alarm Dispatcher (VAD), who will call that unit via radio in their firehouse by the dedicated intercom system. One minute after the alarm is released, it will appear on the computer screen of the radio dispatcher (Radio), who will announce the alarm and the response two times, and ask for acknowledgment from any companies assigned who have not done so by radio, voice alarm, or MDT. The radio dispatcher has a special keyboard called the Status Entry Panel (SEP), which is used to update the status of units based on information received by radio.

The entire process from initial notification until a unit is dispatched can take up to two minutes, depending on the complexity of the call, the information provided by the caller(s), and the degree of other alarm activity in the office. If a dispatch office is so busy that its incoming telephone alarm lines are all occupied or not answered within 30 seconds, the call is automatically transferred to another borough dispatch office. If an Emergency Reporting System (ERS) street fire alarm box is not answered within 60 seconds, usually because all of the alarm receipt consoles are in use, the computer automatically dispatches an engine company to the location of the physical street fire alarm box.

Any communications dispatch office in the city can take a fire or emergency call by telephone for any borough, and upon completion of information taking, the incident will automatically be routed by the Starfire computer to the Decision Dispatcher (DD) for the borough in which the incident is reported.

Fire Dispatch has a minimum staffing (Staffing Level 1), which consist of one Chief Dispatcher, who supervises five Tour Supervising Dispatchers (1 in each Borough). The TSDs supervises between 4–8 Dispatchers, depending on Borough and Time/Day. The minimum staffing may be increased based on many variables, such as: an extraordinary increase in volume of incidents, a catastrophic event, in preparation of a storm, and during large events.

=== Alarm receipt and transmittal ===
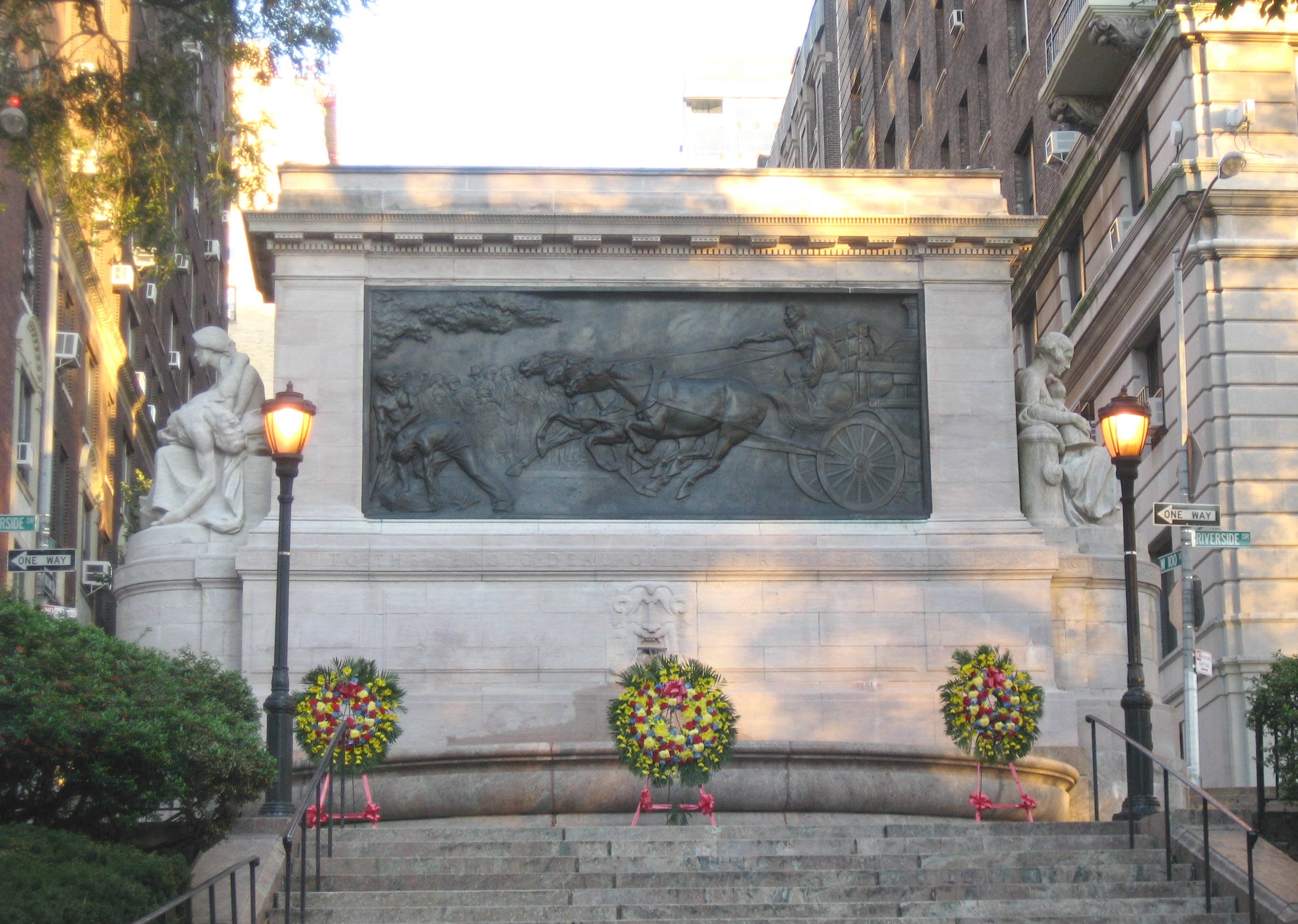
The Firemen's Memorial, a monument to the heroes of the Fire Department in Manhattan

There are four ways in which fires and emergencies can be reported to the New York City Fire Department: telephone alarms, fire alarm boxes, "Class 3" alarms, and verbal alarms.

- Telephone alarms: These are the most common method of contacting the fire department. A telephone alarm is an alarm in which a civilian uses a telephone to dial one of three types of numbers: The first is 9-1-1, which is answered by New York City Police Department (NYPD) Dispatch operators. The NYPD Dispatch operators will then transfer the call to a centralized fire department communications office. The second involves dialing"0". This sends the call to a telephone company operator, who then transfers the call to the fire dispatchers in the proper borough dispatch office. The third is a special seven-digit telephone number, which is published in each borough for the specific purpose of reporting fires. This number is a direct contact to a particular borough's fire department communications dispatch office.
- Fire alarm boxes: These are the second most common method of contacting the fire department. FDNY fire alarm boxes are located on certain street corners and in certain public buildings, such as schools and hospitals, as well as along highways, on bridges, etc. These boxes primarily consist of two types: The first type is the mechanical box (also commonly called a pull-box or a telegraph box), in which a spring-wound mechanism alternately opens and closes an electrical circuit, thereby rendering a coded number linked to the specific location of the box. Until the advent of the Starfire "Computer-Assisted Dispatch System" (CADS), dispatchers had to audibly count the taps from mechanical boxes when they were received in the central offices to decipher the number of the box that was pulled. Today, a "Box Alarm Readout System" (BARS) display handles that aspect of the job. The second type is the "Emergency Reporting System" (ERS) box. This is a system that is equipped with buttons to notify either the FDNY or the NYPD, allowing either department's dispatchers/Dispatch Operators to have direct voice communication with the reporting party. Beginning in the 1970s, ERS boxes started to replace mechanical boxes in many areas of the city, particularly where the number of false alarms involving mechanical boxes were high. In December 1994, then-Mayor Rudolph Giuliani and then-Fire Commissioner Howard Safir began a concerted effort to remove all of the mechanical and ERS boxes throughout New York City in a cost-cutting move. Facing stiff opposition from members of the city council, community groups, dispatchers, and others, the move was blocked by court order as being discriminatory against the disabled (i.e., particularly the speech- and/or hearing-impaired) who—along with the poor—might otherwise have no dependable way to report fires and emergencies if the alarm boxes were eliminated. (In addition, unlike many other cities in the world, it was noted that 117 different languages and dialects are spoken by the residents of and visitors to the city. Since, unlike telephones, a fire alarm box requires no verbal contact to indicate its exact location, a person would not have to be able to speak—at all—or to understand English in order to alert the FDNY or NYPD to a fire or other emergency. For this reason, as well, the boxes were recognized as being vital to New Yorkers' safety.) The court order to block the removal of the boxes provided a means for people to report emergencies during the 2003 blackout, when other forms of communication were cut off. The fire alarm boxes, independent of outside power, continued to function the entire time.
- "Class 3" alarms: These are less common than the first two means of reporting fires. A "Class 3" alarm is one of three numerical classes of alarms given by the FDNY's Bureau of Communications to alert the fire department to automatic fire alarm systems. These Systems are routed through commercial alarm companies. These firms monitor sprinkler systems, standpipes, smoke detectors, and internal pull-stations in non-public occupancies, such as: factories, warehouses, stores, and office buildings. When alarms are received from such accounts, these companies pass along the information to the FDNY central offices, usually by dedicated telephone circuits. The term "Class 3"was derived from the fact that the box number on such an assignment card would have a"3"preceding it, in addition to a "terminal" number following it (e.g.,"3-7012-4"would indicate a private alarm system in a commercial occupancy at a specific address, in the immediate vicinity of Box 7012, on the corner of Review Avenue and Laurel Hill Boulevard in Queens).This is hypothetical. In such cases, the type of alarm (e.g., sprinkler, smoke detector, interior pull-station, etc.) and an exact address—and, often, even a specific section of a building—would instantly be made available to responding units.)
- Verbal alarms: These are the least common means of reporting fires or emergencies, and generally involves a civilian or groups of civilians "verbally" making such reports directly to firehouses or fire companies/Units whether they are in or outside of their Firehouse or other locations. This can include incidents that are observed by fire units themselves when they are away from their quarters. However, "verbal" alarms may also be reported by FDNY EMS Bureau personnel, NYPD personnel, chief officers, Department officials (e.g., commissioners, medical officers, chaplains, et al.), or civilian employees of the FDNY (e.g., communications electricians, mechanics, dispatchers, etc.). These members observe fires or emergencies in the course of the performance of their duties. If a fire company or unit is available in quarters, it will immediately respond to the incident after advising the dispatchers of the same via telephone, voice alarm, or radio. If the unit is away from its firehouse (e.g., responding to or operating at another alarm, on inspection duty, etc.) at the time, the companies or units will either stop at the new incident and operate, or the officer will request a separate assignment (if the reporting unit is unavailable to operate). Based on the information received by the dispatchers, the appropriate action (e.g., transmitting a new box, assigning new units, etc.) is initiated in regard to the new incident.

When a member of the public dials 911, the caller is connected to a police department Dispatch operator, who assigns the call to where it needs to go based on the information provided.

- If it is police related, the information is sent to an NYPD radio dispatcher for the precinct or special unit concerned.
- If it is on a bridge or in a tunnel connected to New Jersey or at an airport, e.g. John F. Kennedy Airport or LaGuardia Airport, the Port Authority of New York and New Jersey is also notified.
- If it is a fire, haz-mat, or rescue incident, the 9-1-1 operator transfers the call by a dedicated phone line to the appropriate FDNY communications dispatch office. (Depending on the type of incident, the NYPD may notify its own Emergency Service Units to respond instead oforalong with the Fire Department.)

Fire alarm dispatchers handle comparatively few medical calls. These types of calls are routed straight to the FDNY's EMS communications office by the NYPD 9-1-1 operators. However, if there is a medical call that requires the assistance of "first-responder"-trained fire units, The Emergency Operators will have said request routed electronically to the appropriate fire alarm central office, for the assignment of the proper personnel and apparatus.

==== Box numbers ====
Each address in the city is assigned a box number, based on the closest street, special building, or highway box. The term "box" refers to the Fire Alarm Boxes, which at one time lined street corners and in front of certain buildings. Each Fire Alarm Box was given a specific number by the FDNY's Bureau of Communications. Even if the physical fire alarm box is no longer at a specific address or street corner, the address or street corner is still assigned that fire alarm box's number. Box numbers can be duplicated in different boroughs, which is why they are always identified by borough name or numerical prefix on the computer (66 for Bronx and Manhattan, 77 for Brooklyn, 88 for Staten Island and 99 for Queens). If there is also a street address given to the dispatchers, the responding apparatus will get this information in the firehouse, over the air, and via their mobile data terminals in the rigs—in addition to the Box number. At present, there are about 16,000 physical fire alarm street boxes in New York City, with many additional special building boxes and highway boxes, as well as "dummy boxes" used for special response assignments. In addition there are two airport crash boxes, one in the LaGuardia Tower, (Queens Box 37), and one in the JFK Tower, (Queens Box 269), which can only be activated by the personnel in these towers. When either box is sounded, it brings an automatic second alarm (2–2) response of equipment, along with various special units.

==== Critical Information Dispatch System ====
Critical Information Dispatch System (CIDS, pronounced by the dispatcher as "Sids") data is transmitted to units in the firehouse or while they are en route to an incident. It is information that is collected about a building during inspections and by public input, which would affect firefighting operations. For example:

- Warehoused apartments
- Type and length of line stretch (or hose)
- Number of apartment units per floor
- Unsafe conditions, standpipe conditions (including other conditions the Bureau of Fire Communications or the FDNY Staff Chiefs deem important)

This information is printed on the fire ticket, and can be read by the dispatcher if requested. This information is also read automatically when a signal 10–75 (working fire) or higher signal is given, or when the supervising dispatcher deems it is important for the units to have it before they arrive at an incident.

==== Radio and bell code signals ====
The New York City Fire Department utilizes a system of ten-code radio signals, in addition to an internal one involving"bell codes"(that their origin to the days when coded telegraph signals were sent over a closed, wired system within the Department) to transmit and relay information involving emergency communications and general, Departmental operations. There are fifty-five "10-codes" used by the Department. There are also sub-codes specific to certain "10-codes." The FDNY is currently one of the last, large fire departments in the country using "10-Codes," as opposed to "plain English," to communicate information by radio.

Signal	Meaning
Signal 1–1	1st alarm response transmitted "box after initial" (Upon additional information or sources received at dispatch operations, dispatchers will fill the optimum assignment compared to the minimum response. Response assignment varies depending on the nature of the reported emergency. This is not a signal that there is a working fire or emergency; a "10–75" or signal 7-5 (announced as an "all hands"), used by a responding unit or chief is confirmation of a fire or emergency).
Signal 2-2	2nd alarm announcement and response.
Signal 3	Indicating an alarm originating in a special FDNY alarm box (8000 series boxes).
Signal 3-3	3rd alarm announcement and response.
Signal 4	Battalion Chief response required.
Signal 4-4	4th alarm announcement and response.
Signal 5	Engine company response required.
Signal 5-5	5th alarm announcement and response.
Signal 5–7	1 engine company and 1 ladder company response required.
Signal 5-5-5-5	Line of duty death (LODD); Flags lowered to half staff.This Signal pays tribute to all Members of the FDNY who have died on duty while at an incident or while conducting other duties.
Signal 6	Marine company response required.
Signal 6-5-2	Department message.
Signal 6-6	Preliminary Signal for the Boroughs of Manhattan and the Bronx. (The Box number following the preliminary signal will determine the Borough. Manhattan and the Bronx do not have the same Street Box numbers.)
Signal 7	Ladder company response required.
Signal 7-5	All-Hands announcement "All hands going to work (or operating)." This is a signal that is given by a Chief, which indicates that at least three engine companies and two ladder companies are (or will be) operating at a scene of a confirmed emergency. This requires the assignment of an additional engine company, a Firefighter Assist and Search Team ("FAST") company, an additional Battalion Chief, a Division Chief, a squad company, a rescue company, and Recuperation and Care ("RAC")Unit.
Signal 7-7	Preliminary signal for the Borough of Brooklyn.
Signal 8	Squad company response required.
Signal 8-8	Preliminary signal for the Borough of Staten Island.
Signal 9	Preliminary report for special units.
Signal 9-9	Preliminary signal for the Borough of Queens.
Signal 10	Rescue company response required.
Signal 14	Battalion Chief relocation or returning from relocation.
Signal 15	Engine company relocation or returning from relocation.
Signal 16	Marine company relocation or returning from relocation.
Signal 17	Ladder company relocation or returning from relocation.

== Fire companies and specialty/support units ==
The New York City Fire Department is made up of fire companies, similar to military companies. Each fire company operates a single type of fire apparatus, and has four shifts of firefighters and company officers. Each company responds to emergency calls from one of the city's 218 firehouses.

There are currently six different types of fire companies in the New York Fire Department, which all operate distinct types of apparatus: 197 engine companies, 143 ladder (or truck) companies, 5 rescue companies, 8 squad companies, 3 marine (or fireboat) companies, and the hazardous materials (hazmat) company. In addition to these six types of fire companies, there are numerous other specialized units that are operated by the Special Operations Command (S.O.C.), the Haz-Mat. Division, and the Marine Division. Each fire company has a specific role at the scene of an emergency.

Each type of fire company utilizes a certain type of fire apparatus, colloquially known as "rigs". Engine companies may be known as "engines" and ladder companies may be known as "trucks."

=== Engine companies ===
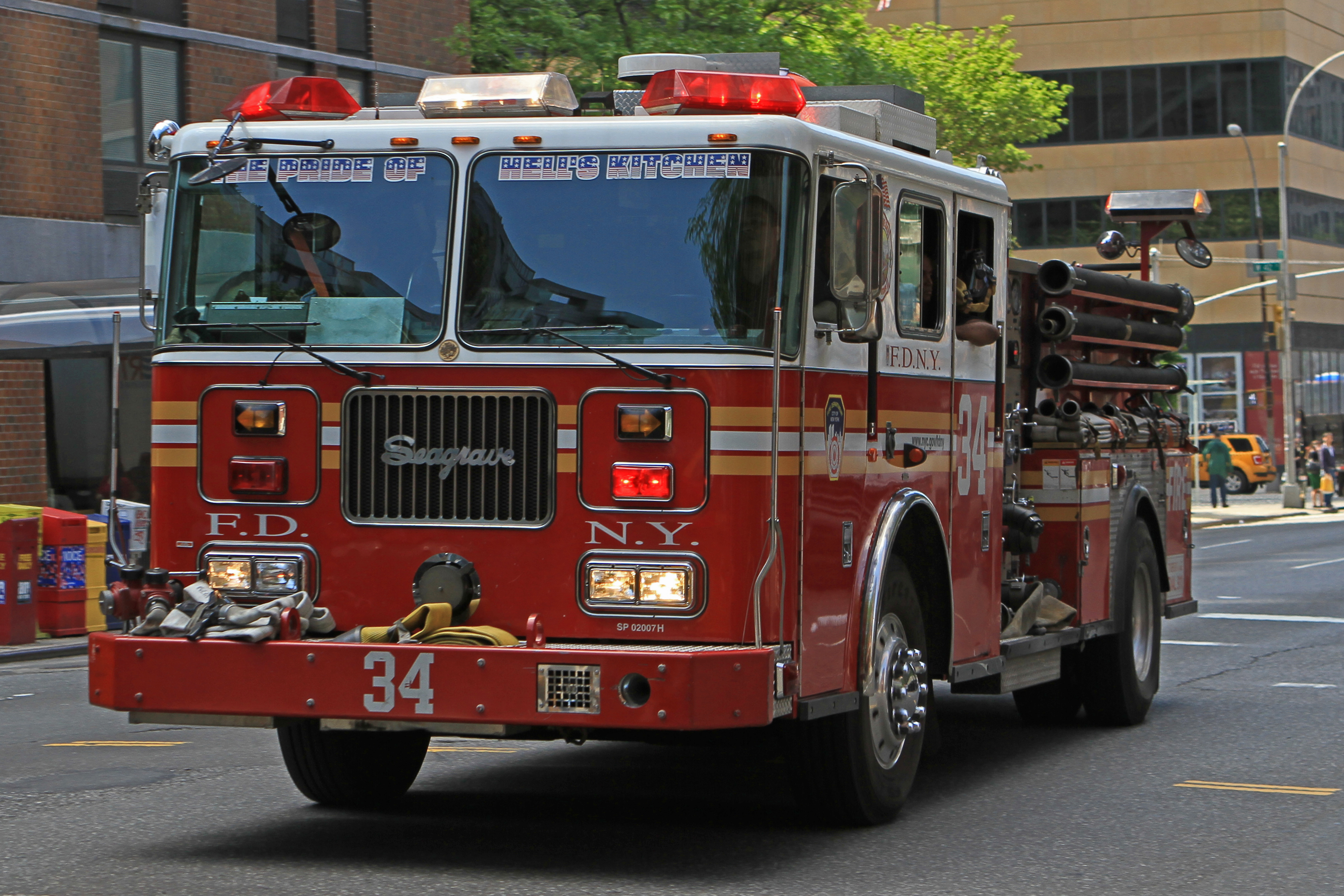
A typical FDNY engine company, also known as a pumper. Pictured is Engine Company 34, quartered in Manhattan.

Engine companies in the New York City Fire Department are tasked with fire suppression, which includes: securing a water supply from a fire hydrant, deploying handlines, then extinguishing a fire. These units respond to other emergencies as well. The apparatus of an engine is known as a pumper truck, and carries a pump (usually 1,000–2,000 gallons per minute), a water tank (usually 500 gallons), fire hoses of varying diameters (usually 1 3/4", 2 1/2", 3 1/2" and 4") in 50' lengths, emergency medical services supplies, ground extension ladders, and an assortment of basic firefighting and rescue tools. There are 197 engine companies in the FDNY.

=== Ladder companies ===
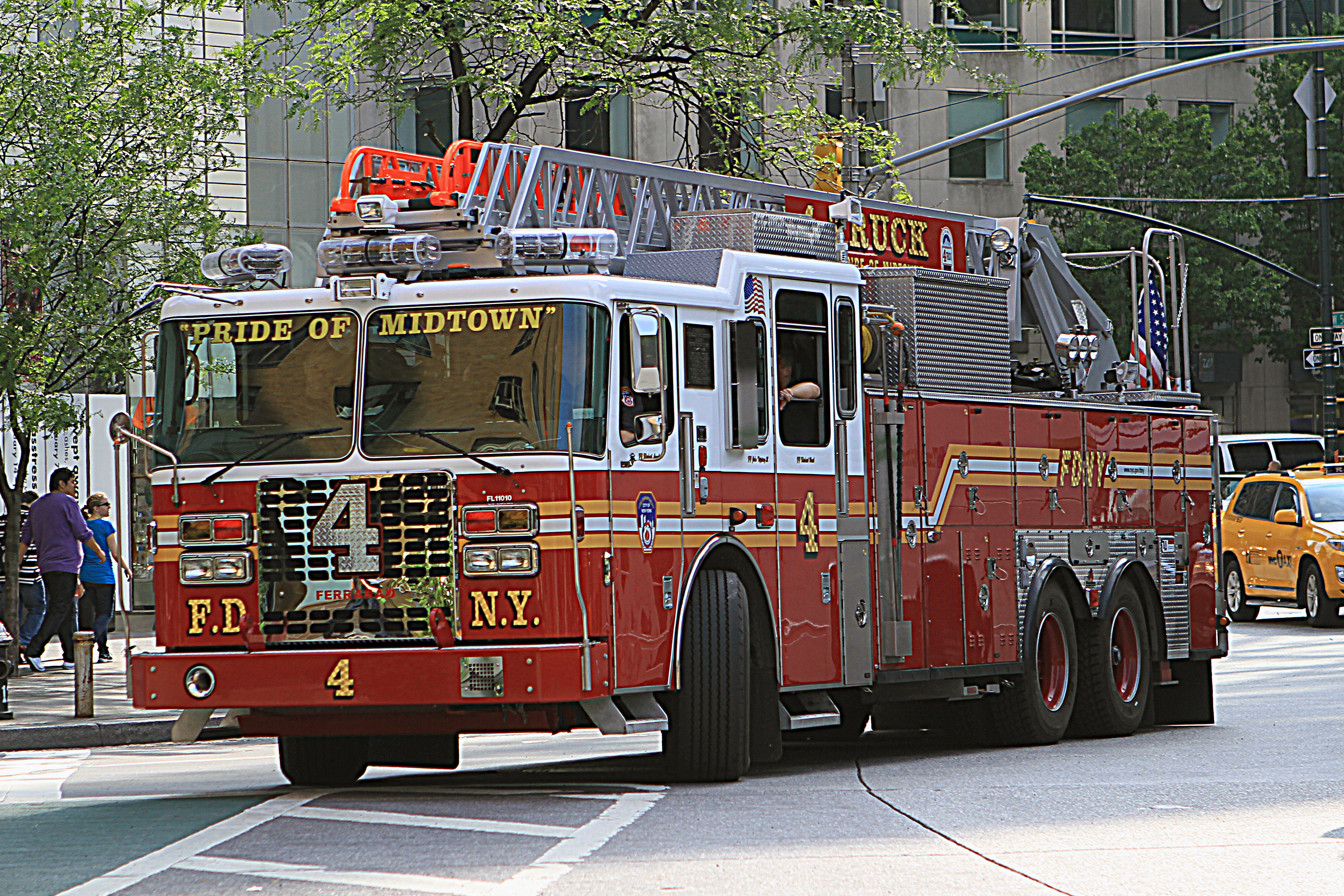
A typical FDNY ladder company, also known as a truck. Pictured is an aerial ladder truck operated by Ladder Company 4, quartered in Manhattan.

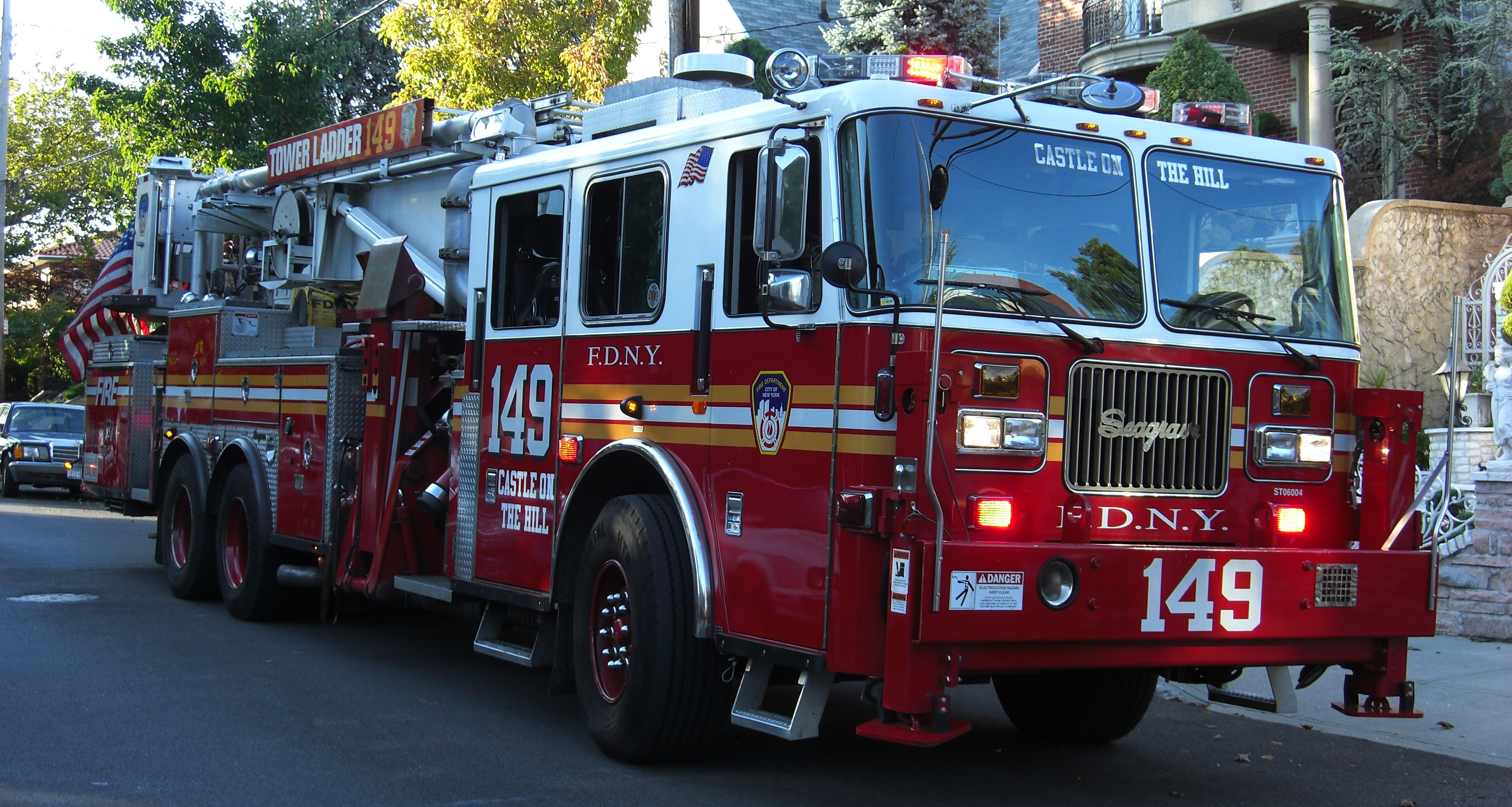
A tower ladder truck is another type of truck operated by the FDNY. Pictured is a tower ladder truck operated by Ladder Company 149, quartered in Brooklyn.

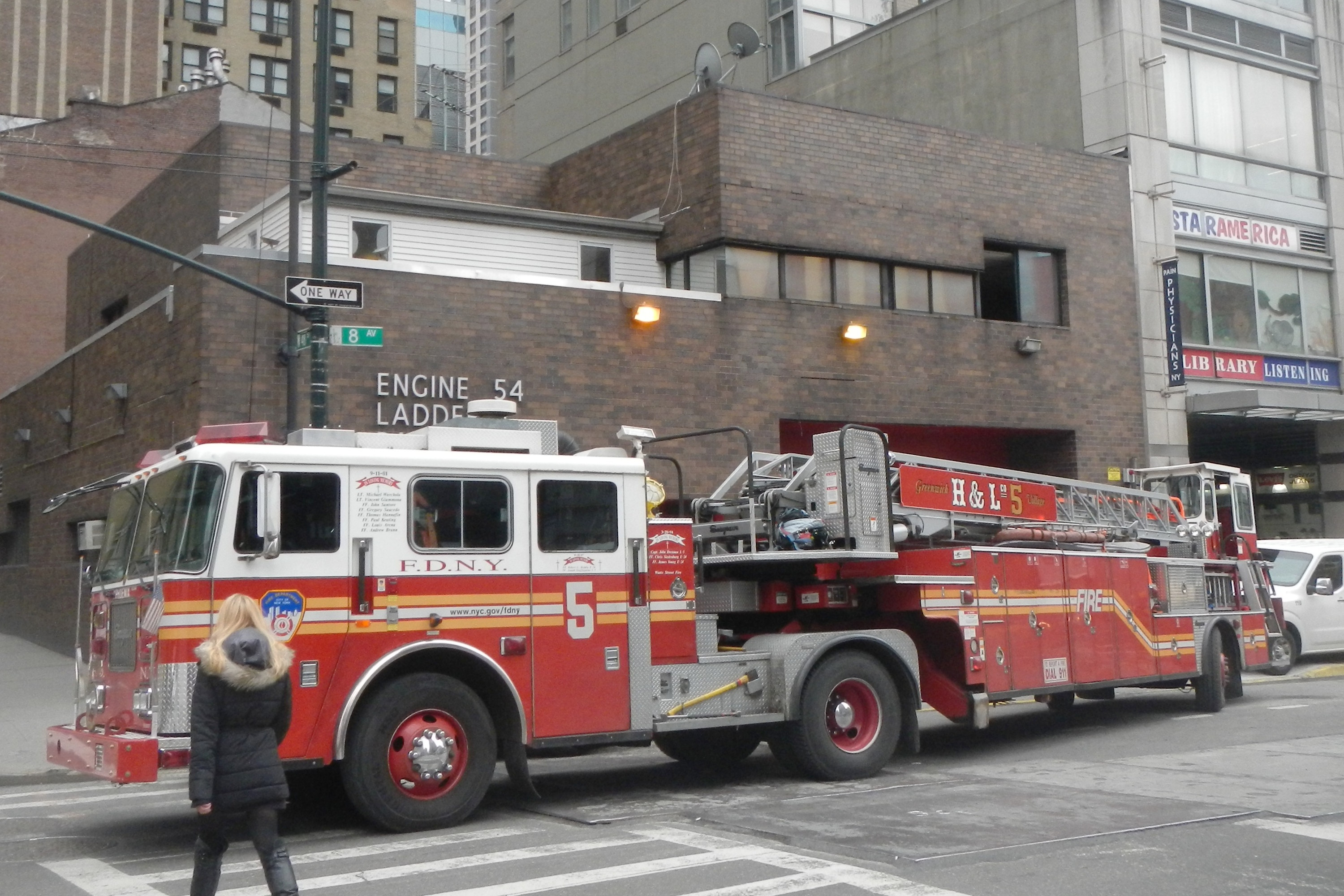
A tiller truck or tractor-drawn aerial ladder truck is another type of Ladder Truck operated by the FDNY. Pictured is a tiller ladder truck operated by Ladder Company 5, quartered in Manhattan.

Ladder Companies (also known as truck companies) in the New York City Fire Department are tasked with forcible entry, search and rescue, ventilation, and ladder-pipe operations at the scene of a fire. They also respond to a variety of specialized emergencies. A ladder company can operate three types of ladder trucks: a rear mounted aerial ladder truck, equipped with a 100' aerial ladder mounted at the rear of the apparatus; a tower ladder truck, equipped with either a 75' or 95' telescoping boom and bucket mounted in the center of the apparatus; and a tractor-drawn aerial ladder truck known as a "hook and ladder" truck, equipped with a 100' aerial ladder. A ladder company will be equipped with various forcible entry tools, ventilation equipment, and a variety of rescue tools, in addition to other tools and equipment to deal with an assortment of fires, technical rescues, and other emergencies, including motor vehicle accidents and other responses. There are 143 Ladder Companies in the FDNY.

=== Rescue companies ===
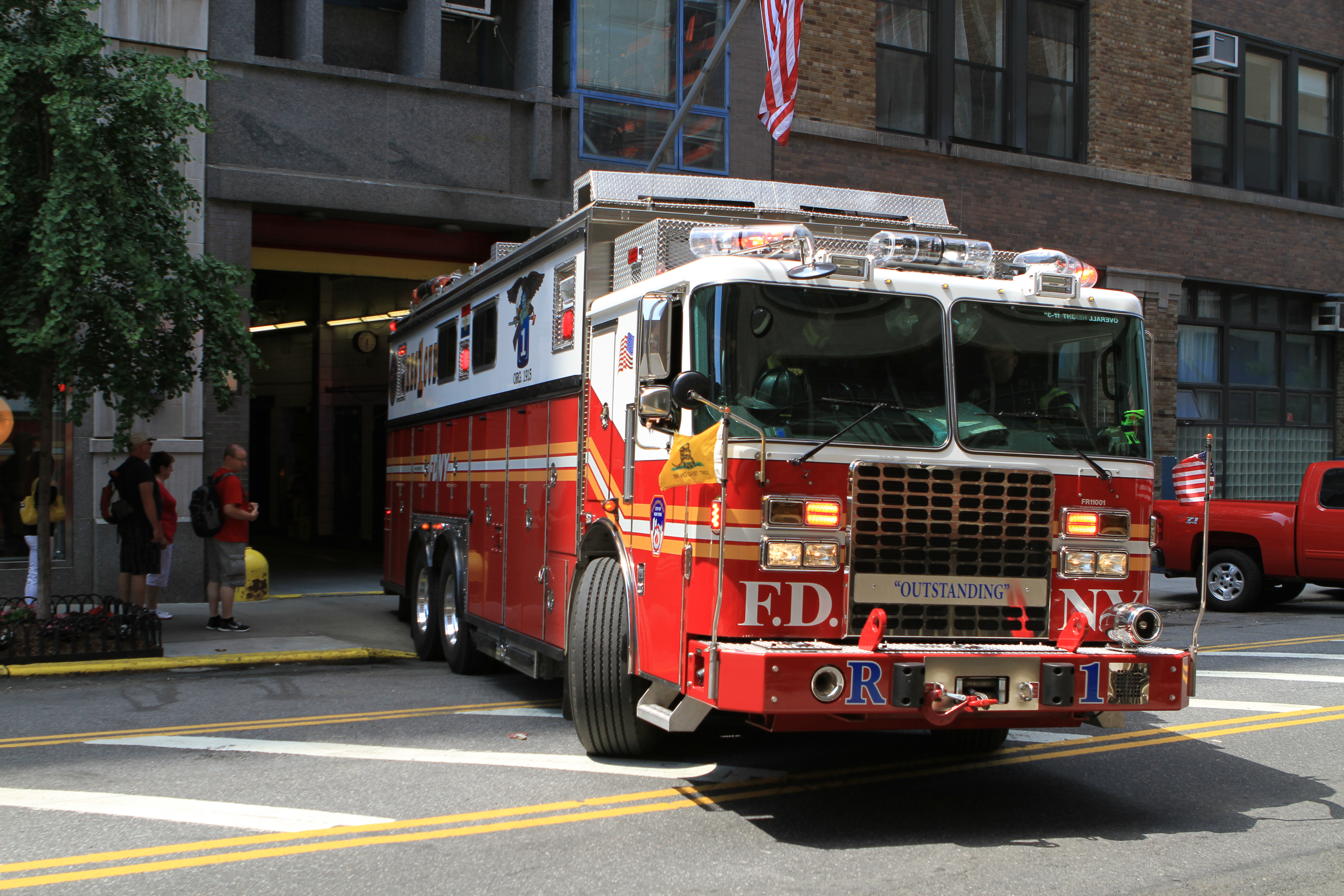
A typical FDNY rescue company, also known as a rescue truck. Pictured is Rescue Company 1, which serves a large portion of Manhattan.

Rescue Companies in the New York City Fire Department are composed of specially-trained members who respond to and deal with a wide variety of rescue situations . A Rescue Company is tasked with responding to and dealing with specialized fire rescue incidents that are beyond the scope and duties of a standard engine company or ladder company. Rescue companies operate rescue trucks, nicknamed "tool boxes on wheels," which carry a wide variety of specialized tools and equipment to aid in operations at technical rescue situations, such as: rope rescues, building collapse rescues, confined space rescues, trench/excavation rescues, machinery and vehicle extrication/rescues, water rescues and a variety of other technical rescue situations. They respond to all structure fires within their response district as well. There are 5 full-time Rescue Companies in the FDNY. Each Rescue Company also operates a specialized building collapse rescue vehicle. The Rescue Companies have a wide variety of Specialized Tools and Equipment including the Jaws Of Life Hydraulic Rescue Tool Systems (Spreaders, Cutters, Combi Tools, Rams, Etc), Numerous Air Bags, Heavy Lifting Equipment, Specialized Cutting Torches, Specialized Air, Electric and Battery Operated Breaching, Breaking and Cutting Tools, Rope Rescue Equipment, Water Rescue Equipment, Emergency Medical Services Equipment and other Specialized Tools and Equipment.

- Rescue Company 1: Rescue Company 1 serves Manhattan below 125th St. on the West Side, and below 116th St. on the East Side. Rescue Company 1's quarters are located at 530 W. 43rd St. in the Hell's Kitchen neighborhood of Midtown, Manhattan.
- Rescue Company 2: Rescue Company 2 serves central and northwestern Brooklyn, not including parts of Williamsburg and Greenpoint. Rescue Company 2's quarters are located at 1815 Sterling Pl. in the Crown Heights neighborhood of Brooklyn.
- Rescue Company 3: Rescue Company 3 serves the Bronx and Harlem above 125th St. on the West Side, and above 116th St. on the East Side. Rescue Company 3's quarters are located at 1655 Washington Ave. in the Claremont neighborhood of the Bronx.
- Rescue Company 4: Rescue Company 4 serves Queens, and parts of northern of Brooklyn. Rescue Company 4 is quartered with Engine 292 at 64–18 Queens Blvd. in the Woodside neighborhood of Queens.
- Rescue Company 5: Rescue Company 5 serves Staten Island and parts of southern Brooklyn. Rescue Company 5 is quartered with Engine 160, TSU 2, and the Chief of the 8th Division at 1850 Clove Rd., in the Grasmere neighborhood of Staten Island.

=== Squad companies ===
The Squad Companies are also composed of specially trained firefighters of the New York Fire Department. Squad companies were initially established by the FDNY to serve as "manpower companies," to supplement the manpower and operations of engine companies and ladder companies. Today, squad companies can function as either engine companies or ladder companies at the scene of a fire or other emergencies, but they are also equipped with the same equipment and specialized tools as the Rescue Companies. In particular, members of a squad company are highly trained in mitigating hazardous materials (hazmat) incidents, supplementing the FDNY's single hazmat company. There are 8 Squad Companies in the FDNY:

- Squad Company 1: Squad Company 1 serves northwestern, western and southern Brooklyn. Squad Company 1's quarters are located at 788 Union St. in the Park Slope neighborhood of Brooklyn.
- Squad Company 8: Squad Company 8 serves Staten Island. Squad Company 8 is quartered with the Staten Island Borough Commander at 3730 Victory Blvd. in the Travis neighborhood of Staten island. Staten Island was served by Squad Company 1 until 2018, when Engine 154 was disbanded and Squad Company 8 was organized in the former quarters. Before that, Staten Island was the only borough without its own squad company.
- Squad Company 18: Squad Company 18 serves Manhattan below 125th St. Squad Company 18's quarters are located at 132 W. 10th St. in the West Village neighborhood of Manhattan.
- Squad Company 41: Squad Company 41 serves the southwestern Bronx and Manhattan above 125th St. Squad Company 41's quarters are located at 330 E. 150th St. in the South Bronx neighborhood of the Bronx.
- Squad Company 61: Squad Company 61 serves the northeastern Bronx. Squad Company 61 is quartered with the Chief of the 20th Battalion at 1518 Williamsbridge Rd. in the Morris Park neighborhood of the Bronx.
- Squad Company 252: Squad Company 252 serves northeastern and eastern Brooklyn. Squad Company 252's quarters are located at 617 Central Ave. in the Bushwick neighborhood of Brooklyn.
- Squad Company 270: Squad Company 270 serves southern Queens. Squad Company 270 is quartered with the Chief of the 13th Division at 91–45 121st St. in the Richmond Hill neighborhood of Queens.
- Squad Company 288: Squad Company 288 serves northern Queens, Greenpoint and parts of Williamsburg. Squad Company 288 is quartered with Haz-Mat.Company 1 at 56–29 68th St. in the Maspeth neighborhood of Queens.

=== Hazardous materials company ===
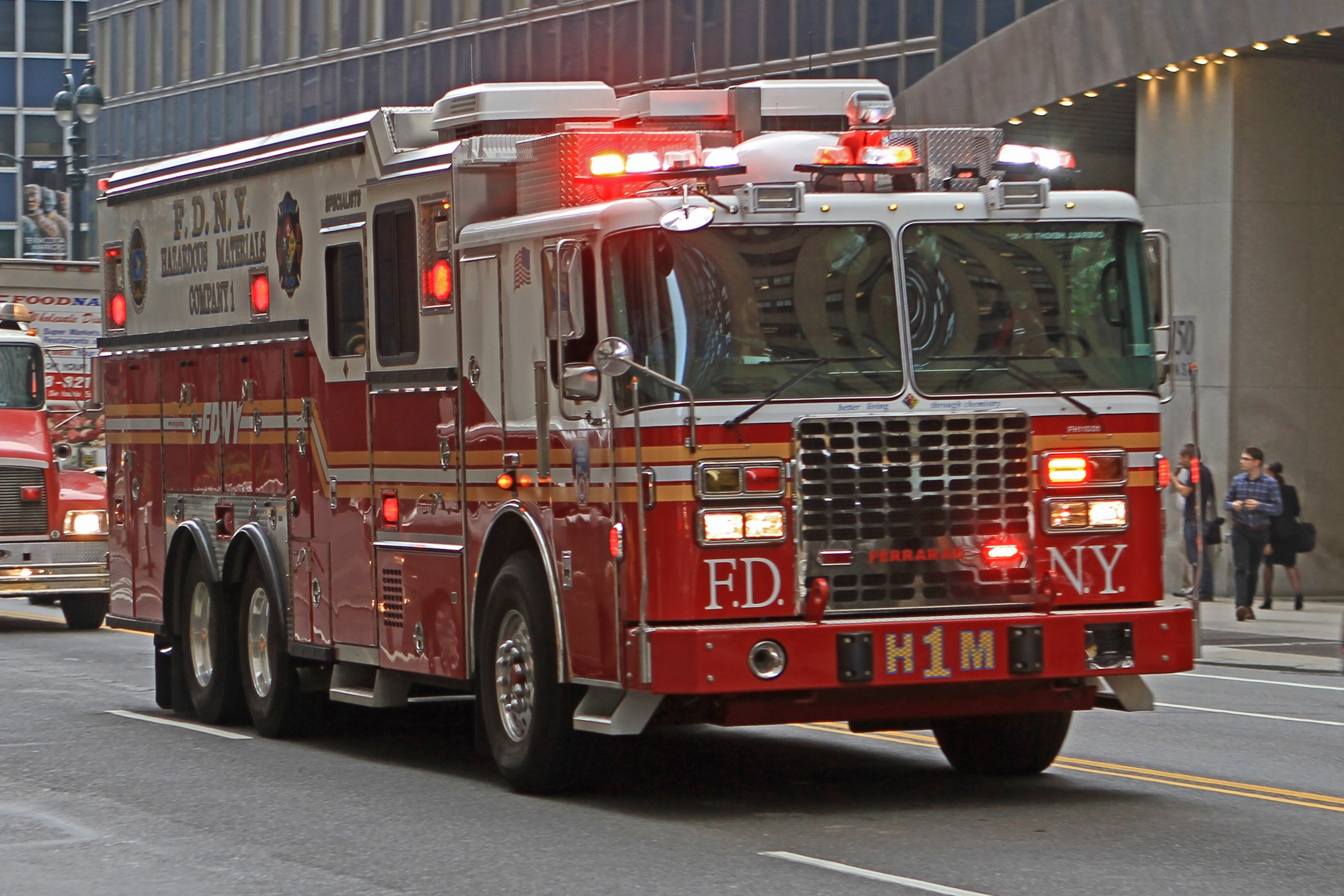
Haz-mat. company 1, quartered in Queens, responds to all major hazardous materials-related calls citywide.

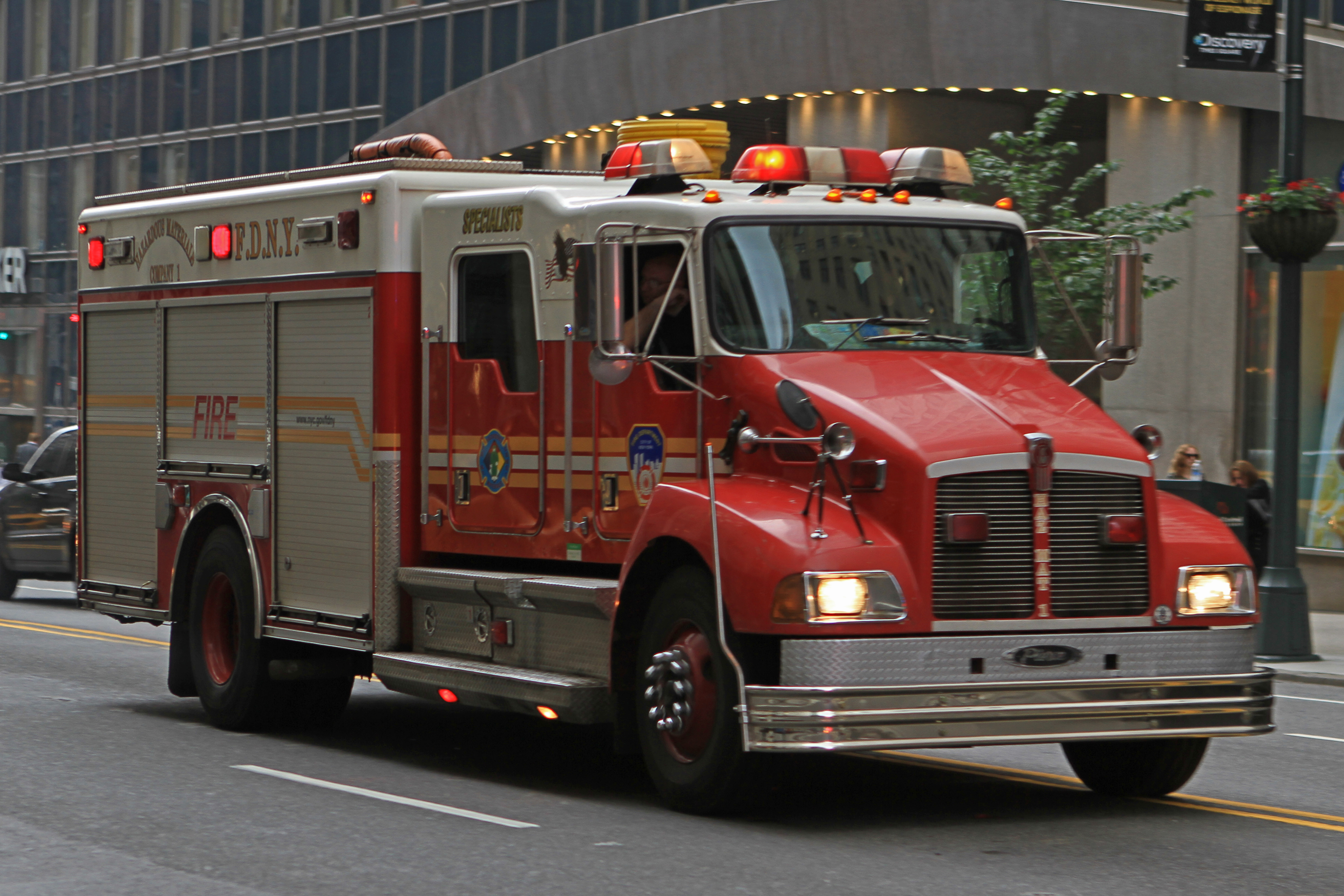
Haz-mat. company 1's second piece of apparatus, which carries additional equipment, and responds to all calls with the main apparatus.

The FDNY hazardous materials (hazmat) company, haz-mat 1 (quartered in Queens), responds to all major citywide hazardous materials incidents, building collapses, contamination-related incidents, terrorism-related disasters, major emergencies, and a variety of other incidents in which their services may be needed.

Similar to the rescue company and squad company apparatus of the FDNY, members of haz-mat company 1 are specially trained to deal with hazardous situations. The haz-mat company operates a haz-mat truck, similar to a rescue truck, which carries a variety of equipment to deal with hazardous situations. Haz-mat 1 also operates a smaller rescue truck which carries extra equipment not carried on the company's main piece of apparatus. The haz-mat company is supplemented by the squad companies primarily, the rescue companies, and four HMTU engine companies whose members are certified haz-mat technicians. These four engine companies, like the squad companies, also operate medium rescue trucks that carry hazmat equipment. Plugging equipment, hazmat personal protective equipment, non sparking tools, and other equipment are carried on the hazardous materials apparatus.

=== Fireboats (marine companies) ===
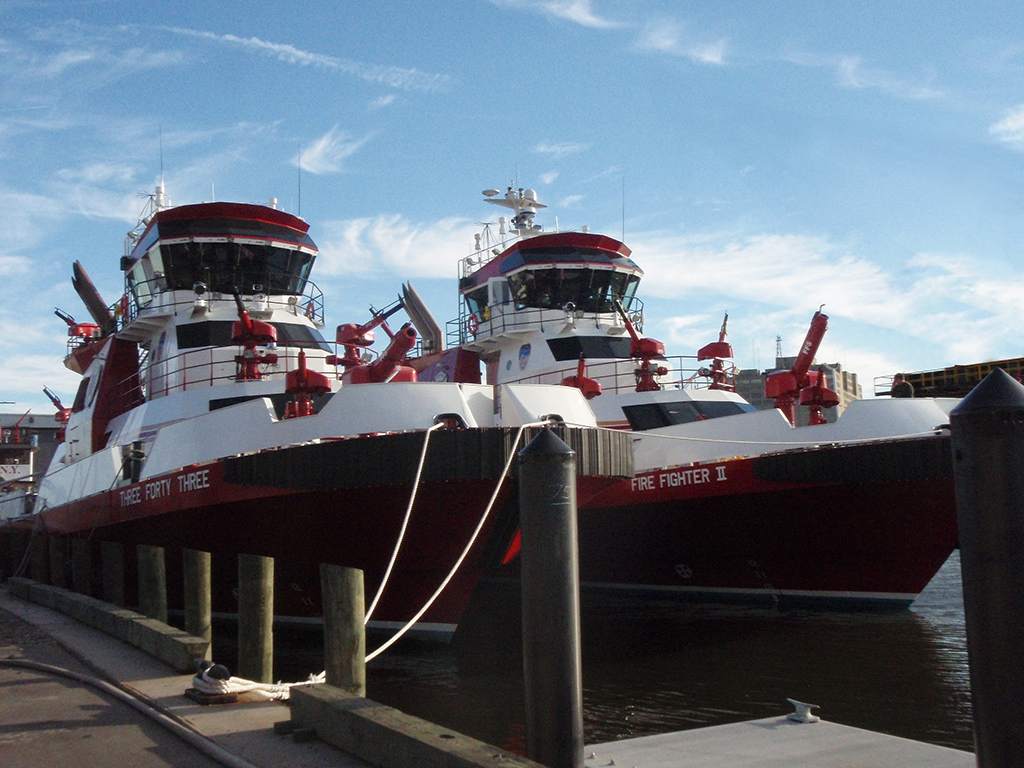
Marine Company 1, Fireboat Three Forty Three, quartered on the Hudson River, and Marine Company 9, Fireboat Firefighter II, quartered in New York Harbor

FDNY operates three Class I fireboats as marine companies year round:

- Marine Company No. 1 – Three Forty Three covering the Hudson River.
- Marine Company No. 6 – Bravest covering the East River.
- Marine Company No. 9 – Fire Fighter II covering the New York Bay.

A * Marine Battalion which responds on all Maritime incidents when available, and several seasonal (Typically from Mid-May through Early-October) Class II Marine Companies :

- 'Marine Company No. 3 covering Jamaica Bay.
- 'Marine Company No. 4 covering Eastchester Bay.
- 'Marine Company No. 8 covering the Staten Island Shoreline.

Three older fireboats are kept in reserve: John D. McKean, Governor Alfred E. Smith, and Kevin C. Kane. A former FDNY Marine Unit, the John J. Harvey, is notable as having returned to active service as Marine 2 on September 11, 2001, and providing firefighting services for 80 hours following the attack.

In 2010, the newly built fireboat, Three Forty Three, replaced the John D. McKean, which entered service in 1954, as Marine 1. A twin, 140-foot, vessel, Fire Fighter II, replaced Fire Fighter, dedicated in 1938, as Marine 9. The two new boats cost $60 million, funded by a grant from the Department of Homeland Security, and represented the city's first major investment in new fireboats in 50 years. The $2.4 million Bravest, commissioned on May 26, 2011, is smaller than the other two Class I boats, at 65 feet, but is able to operate in shallower waters, including those near the city's airports.

The department also has a fleet of approximately 14 smaller, class II fireboats, with ten 33-foot Rapid Response Fire, three 31-foot medical response, and one 33-foot SCUBA boats and other equipment that can be activated for use when needed .

=== Volunteer departments ===
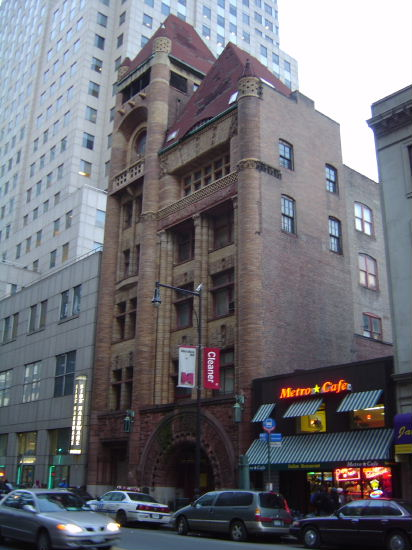
Old Brooklyn Fire Headquarters near MetroTech Center pictured in 2007; it was designed by architect Frank Freeman and built in 1892 for the Brooklyn Fire Department

Nine volunteer fire companies remain in New York City and respond to calls in their neighborhood, in addition to FDNY units. They are typically in more isolated neighborhoods of the city. By borough, the volunteer companies are:

- Bronx (1) – Edgewater Park Volunteer Hose Company No. 1
- Brooklyn (1) – Gerritsen Beach Fire Volunteers Inc.
- Queens (5) – West Hamilton Beach VFD, Broad Channel VFD, Roxbury VFD, Rockaway Point VFD, and Point Breeze VFD
- Staten Island (2) – Oceanic H&L Company No. 1, Richmond Engine Co. 1

The Staten Island volunteer companies are dispatched by the Staten Island Communications Office and operate on the FDNY Staten Island frequency. Broad Channel and West Hamilton Beach have teleprinters in parallel with the FDNY fire companies that also serve their area. The Brooklyn and first four volunteer companies in Queens also provide ambulance services.

The nine volunteer fire departments supplement the FDNY, however, their services have sometimes proven essential. They are especially needed in urgent events, such as storms that can cause flooding conditions that prevent FDNY companies from reaching alarms promptly. Typically, the departments respond in addition to the initial assignment dispatched by the FDNY. The volunteer departments are fully trained and operational with the apparatus and equipment they have. Therefore, when they arrive to a scene first or when needed, they will implement their operations alongside FDNY as applicable.

=== Other units ===
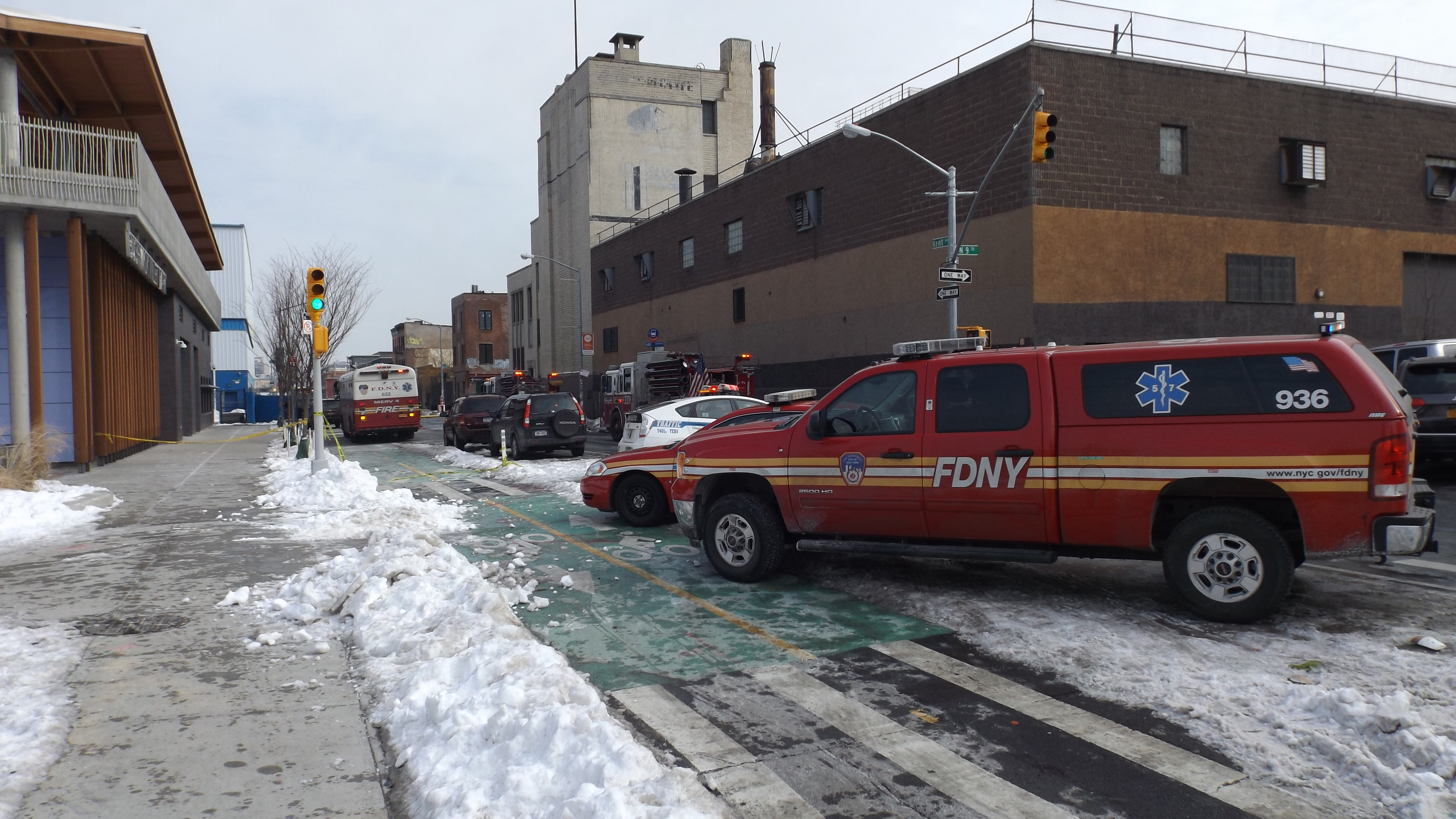
FDNY EMS station 57 supervisor's command pickup, a 2012 GMC extended crew cab 4X4 diesel pickup XLS, built by Odyssey Specialty Vehicles. Note, two FDNY engines and MERV in the background.

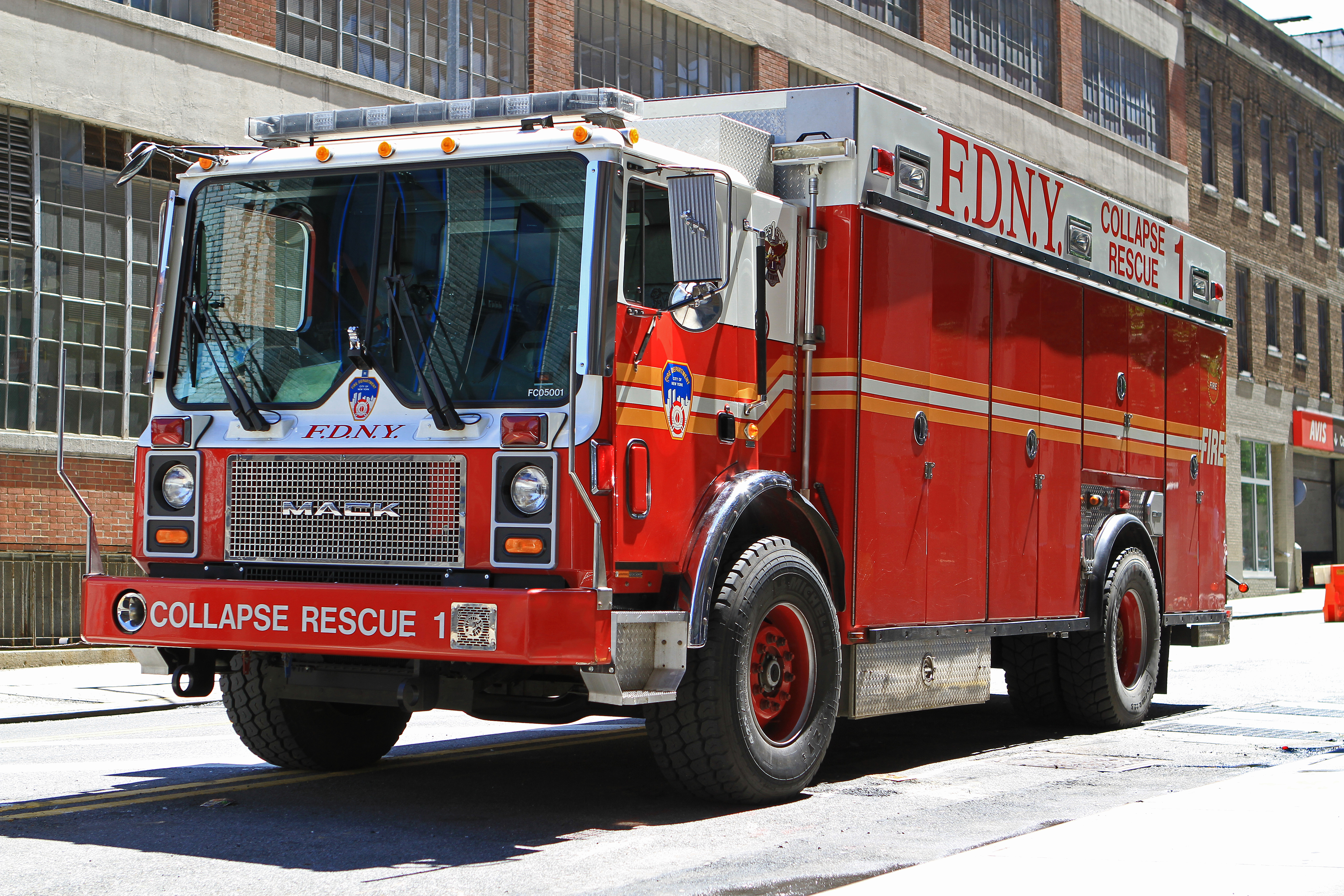
Collapse rescue 1's apparatus

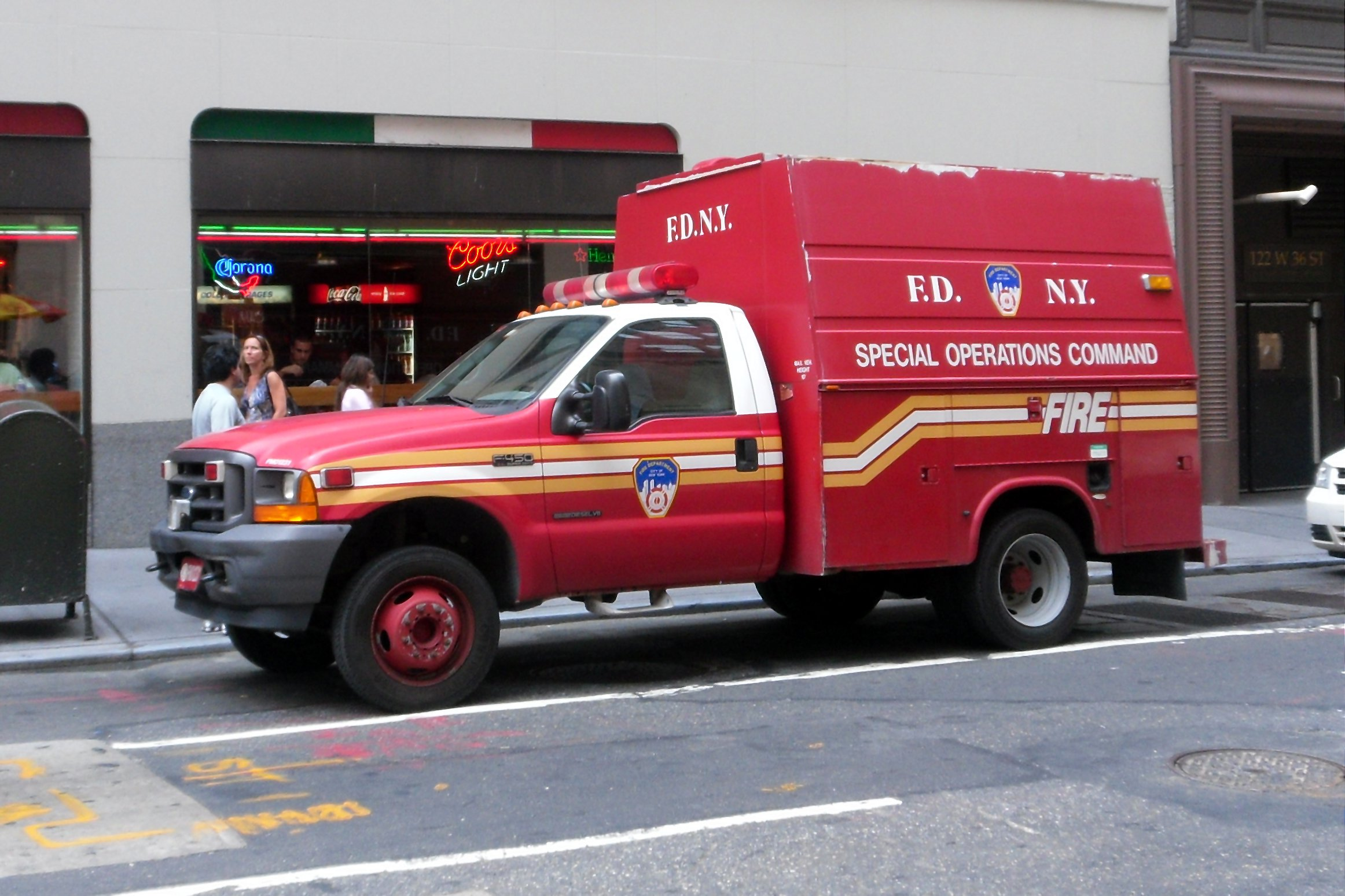
One of the many smaller S.O.C. support trucks operated by the FDNY for use at various emergencies

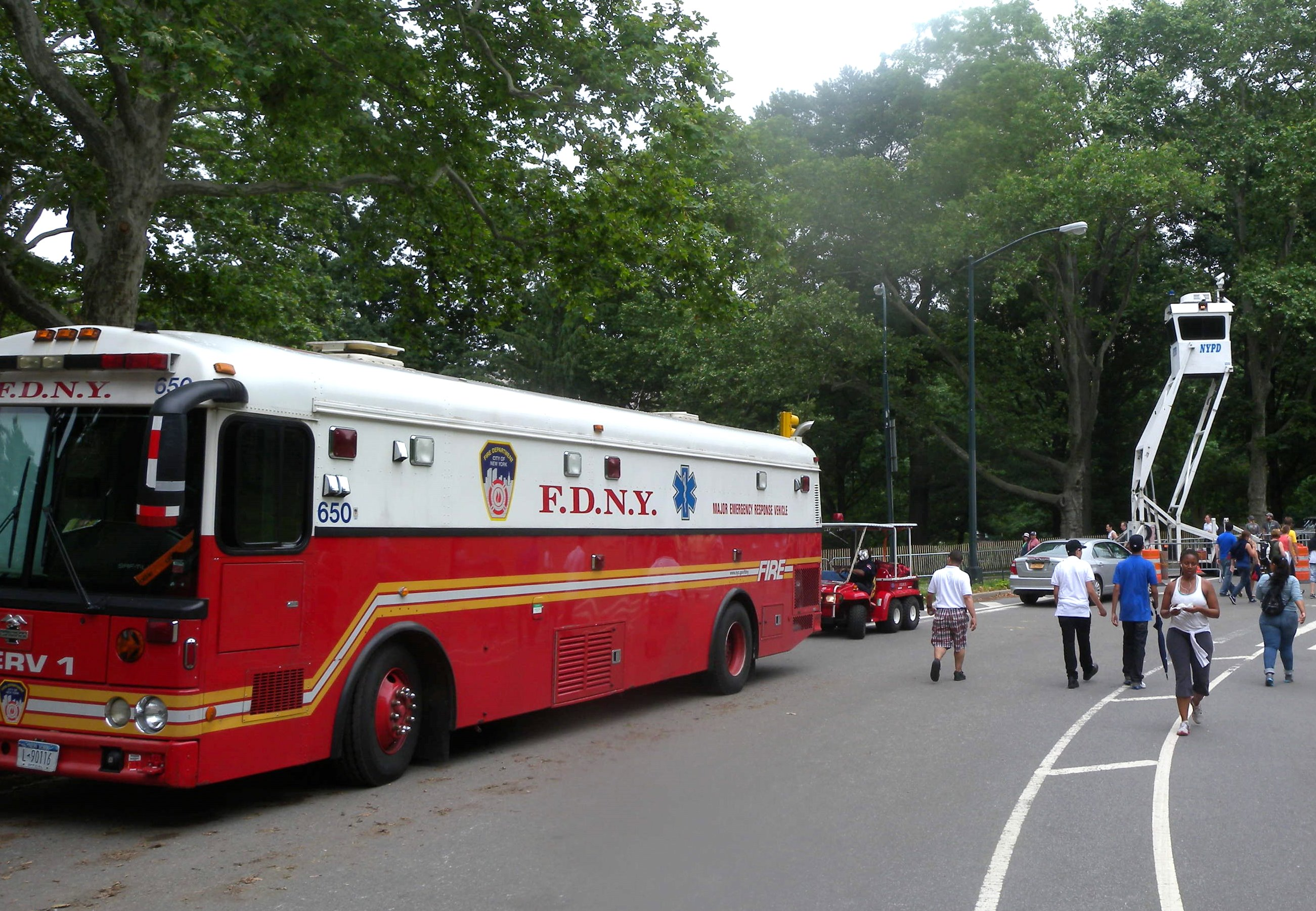
MERV-1

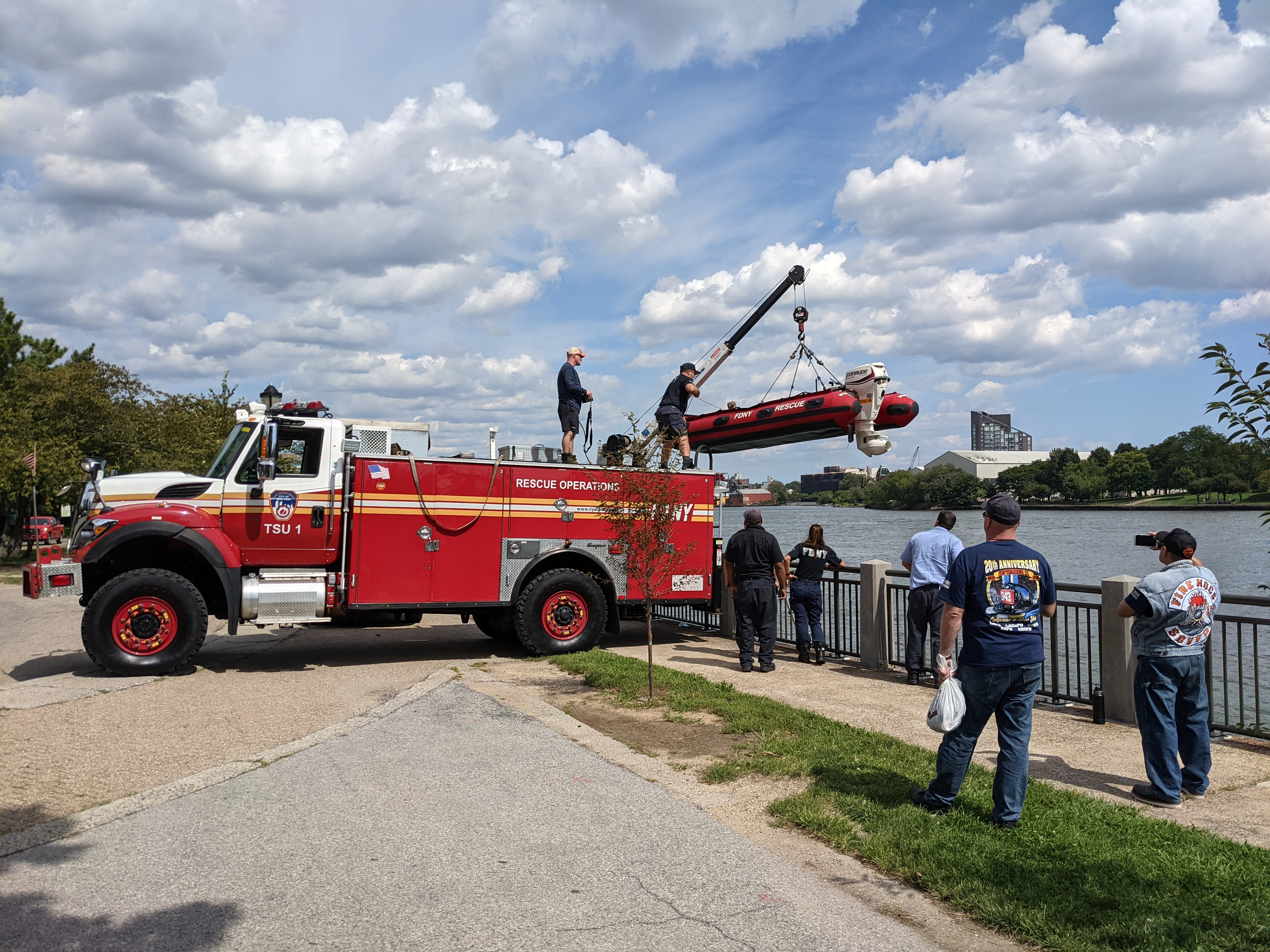
Rescue boat being lowered into the East River at the Roosevelt Island FDNY special operations command on September 11, 2021

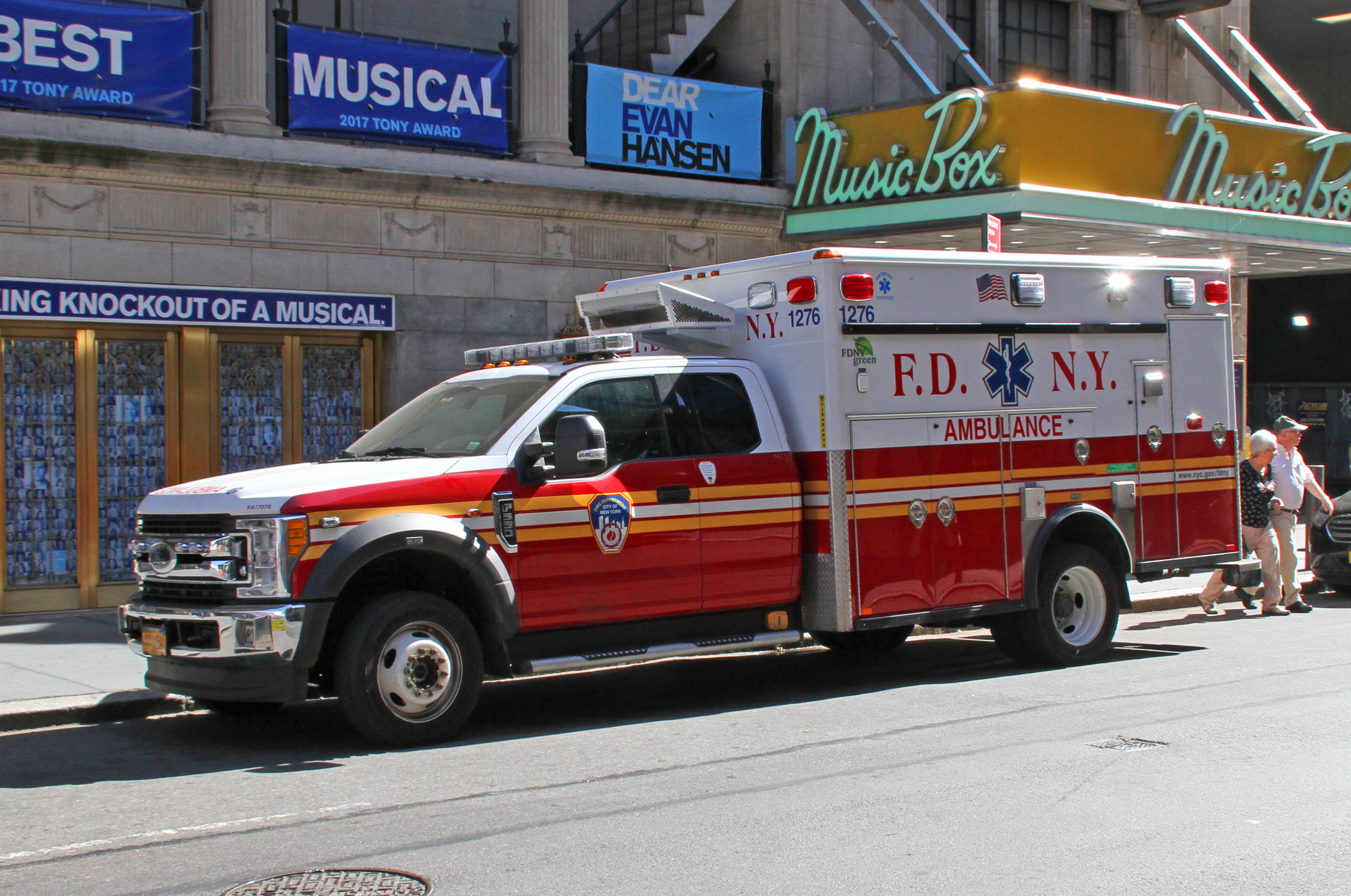
A 2017 Ford F-550 FDNY ambulance

- Battalion chief unit: A battalion chief unit is a command vehicle tasked with the responsibility of delivering a battalion chief to fires and other emergency incidents. Once on the scene of any emergency, the vehicle then takes on the role of a command vehicle, utilizing its radios and mobile data terminal (MDT) equipment. There are 49 fire suppression battalion chief units as well as the special operations/rescue, marine, safety, and hazmat battalion chief units for a total of 53 battalion chiefs on duty 24/7.
- Division chief unit: A division chief unit, like a battalion chief unit, is a command vehicle tasked with the responsibility of delivering a division chief to fires and other emergency incidents. Once on the scene of any emergency, the vehicle then takes on the role of a command vehicle, utilizing its radios and MDT equipment. There are 9 division chief units in the FDNY.
- Mask service unit (M.S.U.): The mask service unit is a vehicle that carry a total of 230 SCBA cylinders, along with cascade equipment to refill cylinders.
- Recuperation and care unit (R.A.C.): A recuperation and care unit utilizes a vehicle that is specially outfitted with equipment that will enable it to provide rehabilitation to firefighters on a major incident. There are currently 5 RAC units. The RAC unit responds to every 10–75.
- Field communications unit (field comm.): The field communications unit utilizes a vehicle that is specially equipped with communication equipment, such as telephones, broadband internet, and mobile radios along with other equipment. Its main responsibility is to provide communication support to the on scene incident commander at major incidents.
- Satellite unit (satt.): A satellite unit utilizes a special fire vehicle equipped with extra 4.5 inch large diameter hose, 6 inch diameter suction hose, foam agent and a high-volume deluge gun to support the operations of other fire units on scene. Satellite units respond as part of the second alarm response, and Staten Island first alarms, and other certain boxes.
- Tactical support unit (T.S.U.): A tactical support unit utilizes a 4x4 vehicle equipped with generators and a variety of high intensity lights to aid firefighters during low light conditions. Additional specialized equipment, such as extrication tools and a six-person Avon boat, are also carried on this vehicle.
- Thawing unit: The thawing units are vehicles that carry a portable steam-generating boiler; its high-pressure steam is used to thaw frozen hydrants, connections, and hoselines, and used to keep equipment on the fireground, such as aerial ladders, free of ice. There is only one thawing unit per borough.
- Brush fire unit: A brush unit utilizes a vehicle that is a four-wheel-drive, all-terrain unit that is used to reach hilly, remote, and marshy areas, in order to extinguish fires involving weeds, grass, and other vegetation. Along with regular firefighting equipment, it carries its own water, in addition to rakes, shovels, and backpack extinguishers.
- Ambulance: The New York City Fire Department staffs emergency medical technician (EMT) basic life support (BLS) and paramedic advanced life support (ALS) ambulances to provide emergency medical services to the city of New York. These are commonly referred to by the slang term bus.
- Haz-tac ambulance: The 39 EMS units are known as the hazardous material tactical units (haz-tac ambulances), and are trained to the haz mat technician level. This allows them to provide emergency medical care and decontamination in hazardous environments, in addition to their normal 911 duties.
- Rescue medic: An advanced life support (ALS) or paramedic ambulance that is trained to the haz mat technician level, and are also trained as rescue medical technicians, specializing in medical care in adverse environments. The members of rescue medic units receive an extra 12% speciality pay.
- EMS conditions unit: A EMS conditions vehicle utilizes a vehicle that is assigned to an emergency medical service supervisor. An emergency medical service supervisor oversees ambulances within their assigned area.
- Haz tac battalion unit: The haz tac battalion unit utilizes a vehicle that is assigned to an emergency medical service supervisor. This officer is the captain of the FDNY EMS SOC unit. The officer is trained as a hazmat technician and as rescue technician. The unit responds to speciality assignments in order to oversee the medical management at special assignments, and the overall operation of the haz tac battalion.
- Haz tac officer's unit: The haz tac officer's unit utilizes a vehicle that is assigned to an emergency medical service supervisor. This officer is trained as a hazmat technician and as rescue technician. The unit responds to specialty assignments in order to oversee the medical management at special assignments. There are two units that cover the entire City of New York 24/7.
- EMS major emergency response vehicle (MERV) : Four MERVs provide care and transportation of numerous patients simultaneously. The units carry specialized MCI equipment and supplies, and can serve as an administrative point for patient care when transportation to a receiving facility is delayed, and provide care for patients not requiring transportation. MERVs are usually assigned for 2nd alarm fires, emergencies in medical and correctional facilities, and other major incidents. Equipment carried includes backboards, splints, wheeled, folding and scoop stretchers, five M oxygen cylinders and nine D oxygen cylinders with associated airway equipment, defibrillators, dressings and bandages, and WMD antidote. The four patient care areas on the MERV can handle up to 13 patients, with one stretcher and three seating areas.
- EMS mobile respiratory treatment unit (MRTU) : Three MRTUs can treat 32 seated ambulator patients with oxygen therapy, or transport 28 seated patients. Additional oxygen ports can handle patients outside the vehicle. The MRTUs have a cascade system of eight 8000-liter oxygen cylinders, sufficient for three hours use before replenishment. The units are also sometimes used to shelter persons in extreme temperatures. MRTUs are typically assigned at second alarm fires, emergencies in transit, aircraft incidents and other major emergencies such as collapses.
- EMS mobile emergency transportation unit (METU) : Three METUs can transport 24 patients on stretchers or backboards, or 32 seated patients can be transported by removing the stretchers. Up to ten wheelchairs can be accommodated in the center aisle. On board equipment include 30 D-tank oxygen cylinders, 30 regulators, portable suction devices, generators, air conditioning, one standard, one bariatric and 24 folding stretchers. A METU is typically assigned on any incident with ten or more stretcher patients, incidents in medical facilities, in transit and other aircraft incidents.
- EMS logistics support unit (LSU) : Five LSUs are in service that carry large quantities of oxygen, long boards, mass casualty supplies including 20 SKED stretchers, and supplies to decontaminate equipment at MCIs. Each LSU also have a 18 by 23 foot and a 16 by 24 foot tent for patient treatment, with space for 24 seated patients or 12 stretcher patients, or as a command post. Additional equipment includes generators, lights, stair chairs, command boards, heaters and scene lights.
- EMS response physician: A fire department EMS medical director who is an emergency physician with specialized training in hazardous material, technical rescue, and other specialized prehospital skills, such as on-scene limb amputations. The response physician responds to major mass casualty incidents, or as part of the rescue medical task force for patients requiring technical rescue or prolonged extrication. There are nine EMS response physicians throughout the city who go by the radio designation Car 5M ("5 Mary Car").

== Ranks ==
Below insignia and ranks are attributed to this citation, unless specifically referenced by another source. Fire and EMS officers holding the same title wear the same insignia unless otherwise noted. This department uses Military style insignia for the Shirt Collar, Bugle Insignia for the Dress Collar and Stripes for the Dress Sleeves.

Rank titles	Insignia		
Rank titles	Shirt collar	Dress collar	Dress sleeve
Chief of Department			
Chief of Operations			
Chief of EMS
Assistant Chief			
Deputy Assistant Chief			
Division Commander			
EMS Division Chief
Senior Chaplain
Chief Inspector
Deputy Chief			
Chaplain
Deputy Chief Inspector			
Battalion Commander			
Battalion Chief			
Captain			
Associate Inspector L2			
Lieutenant			
Associate Inspector L1			
EMS Sergeant			
Firefighter	No insignia		
Inspector	No insignia		
EMT	No insignia		
Paramedic	No insignia		

Note: In place of bugles, captains and lieutenants assigned to ladder companies are signified by axes, rescue companies by Lyle guns, squad companies by crossed ladders and stacked tip nozzles, and marine companies by bugles with an anchor.

== Union representation ==
The department's lieutenants, captains, battalion chiefs, deputy chiefs, medical officers and supervising fire marshals are represented by the Uniformed Fire Officers Association (UFOA). Firefighters, fire marshals, marine engineers, marine pilots and marine wipers are represented by the Uniformed Firefighters Association (UFA). Fire alarm dispatchers, supervising fire alarm dispatchers, and chief fire alarm dispatchers are represented by the Uniformed Fire Alarm Dispatchers Benevolent Association. All three union groups are locals of the International Association of Fire Fighters (IAFF). EMTs, paramedics and fire protection inspectors are represented by the Uniformed EMTs, Paramedics & Fire Inspectors and EMS officers are represented by the Uniformed EMS Officers Union, both of which are locals of District Council 37.

== In popular culture ==
=== Literature ===
The Fire Department of New York has appeared a number of times within literature. "Report from Engine Co. 82", "20,000 Alarms", and "The Last Men Out: Life on the Edge at Rescue 2 Firehouse" are three of the most famous pieces of FDNY literature. In addition to memorials, the FDNY has produced a number of educational materials. One of these books is the 177 page "Fire Department of New York- Forcible Entry Reference Guide- Techniques and Procedures".

=== Film and television ===
The New York City Fire Department has also appeared in numerous films and television shows. One of the earliest was the 1972 documentary Man Alive: The Bronx is Burning, for BBC Television. It was screened in the United Kingdom on September 27, 1972, and followed firefighters from a firehouse in the South Bronx: Battalion 27, Ladder 31 and Engine 82. It chronicled the appalling conditions the firefighters worked in with roughly one emergency call per hour, and the high rates of arson and malicious calls. The documentary focused heavily on firefighter Dennis Smith, who served in the South Bronx area and went on to write Report from Engine Co. 82 and a number of other books. He has become a prominent speaker on firefighting policy.

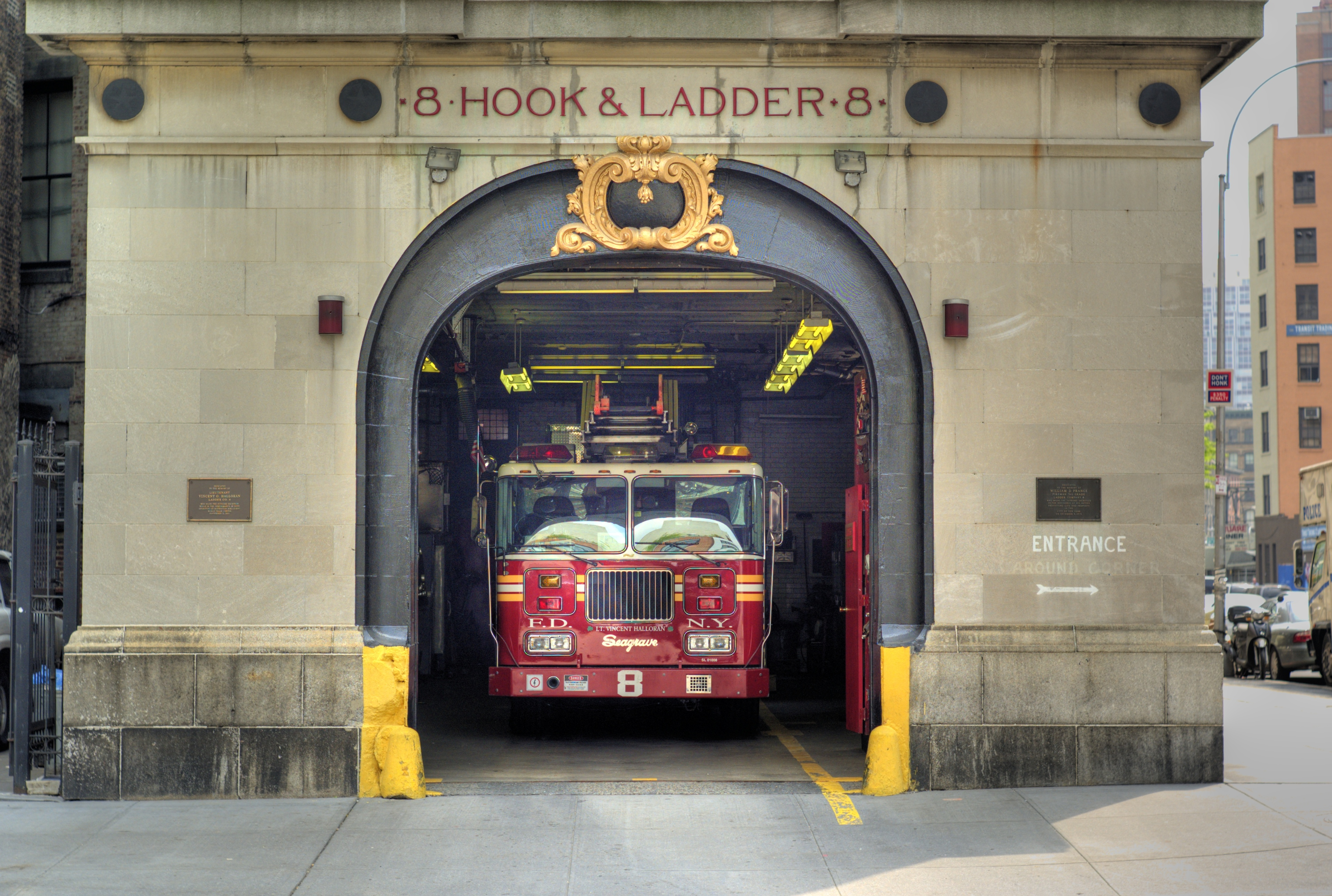
The Manhattan quarters of FDNY Ladder Company 8, also known as the Ghostbusters' Firehouse

In 1984 and 1989, the comedy films Ghostbusters and Ghostbusters II used a firehouse for external shots of the Ghostbusters' headquarters building. Ladder Company 8's house at 14 North Moore Street in Tribeca was reportedly chosen because writer Dan Aykroyd knew the area and liked the building. The interior of the Ghostbusters base was shot in a Los Angeles studio, and in Fire Station No. 23, a decommissioned Los Angeles firehouse. Ladder 8 has the sign from Ghostbusters II mounted on the wall inside the house; fans of the franchise frequently stop by to take photos of the building and ask to pose with the sign.

In 1991, FDNY firefighter Brian Hickey and his brother Raymond produced a documentary entitled Firefighters: Brothers in Battle. The film features footage of fires and rescues throughout the five boroughs of New York City, including the Happy Land Social Club fire which killed 87 persons, dramatic rescues from a crashed airplane off of La Guardia Airport, and footage and interviews at Medal Day 1991. Raymond died of cancer in 1993 and Brian was killed on 9/11 while operating at the World Trade Center. Brian last served as the Captain of Rescue Company 4 in Queens.

The 2002 documentary film 9/11 is footage of the 9/11 attacks filmed by FDNY James Hanlon, a firefighter from Ladder Co. 1, and brothers Jules and Gédéon Naudet. It follows members of Engine 7/Ladder 1 and Battalion 1 on Duane Street in Lower Manhattan. The 2005 film Brotherhood: Life in the FDNY, focuses on Squad 252 in Brooklyn, Rescue 1 in Manhattan and Rescue 4 in Queens.

The 2002 Sesame Street video Elmo Visits the Firehouse revolves around Elmo paying a visit to Engine Company 58, Ladder Company 26 of the FDNY to learn all about how firefighters do their jobs and how to "get low and go", after a fire at Hooper's Store scares him.

A 2006 PBS documentary called Taking The Heat features the struggle of women to join the FDNY, and Brenda Berkman's part in it.

Television series about FDNY have included Rescue Me, which ran from 2004 to 2011 and depicted the fictional life of firefighters in an FDNY firehouse. The NBC drama Third Watch ran from 1999 to 2005 and provided a fictionalized and dramatized depiction of the firefighters and paramedics of the FDNY and police officers of the New York City Police Department.

In 2015, the twenty-seventh season of The Amazing Race featured a tribute to the FDNY's 150th anniversary.

The 2019 the semi-autobiographical film King of Staten Island, directed by and starring Pete Davidson, makes reference to Davidson's father, Staten Island firefighter Scott Matthew Davidson while exploring the impact of his death in the September 11 attacks on his son.

== See also ==
- Collapse of the World Trade Center
- Communication during the September 11, 2001 attacks
- Great Fire of New York (1776)
- Great Fire of New York (1835)
- Great Fire of New York (1845)
- Black Sunday (NYC, FDNY) (2005)
- List of New York fire departments
- New York City Fire Department Bureau of EMS
- New York City Fire Commissioner
- New York Fire Patrol
- New York City Fire Department Rescue Company 1
- New York City Office of Administrative Trials and Hearings (OATH), for hearings conducted on certain summonses issued by FDNY
- Rossville Fire of 1963
- Rescue and recovery effort after the September 11, 2001 attacks
- Waldbaum's supermarket fire a 1978 blaze that killed six firefighters.
