= Fireboats of New York City =

Fireboats maintained by New York City

For much of the late 19th and early 20th century, New York City maintained a fleet of ten fireboats. In recent decades technology has improved to where smaller boats can provide the pumping capacity that required a large boat in the past. These smaller boats require smaller crews, and the crews themselves require less training. Like many other cities, the FDNY operates a fleet with a smaller number of large fireboats, supplemented by a number of unnamed boats in the 10 meter range.

some fireboats of the FDNY
image	name	commissioned	retired	dimensions (ft)	pumping capacity (gpm)	notes
	William F. Havemeyer	1875	1901	106 × 22 × 10	6,000	
	Zophar Mills	1882	1934	120 × 25 × 12	6,000	
	Seth Low	1885	1917	99 × 24 × 9	3,500	Brooklyn Fire Department
	The New Yorker	1890	1931	125 × 26 × 12	13,000	
	David A. Boody	1892	1914	105 × 23 × 7	6,500	
	William L. Strong	1898	1948	100 × 24 × 12.6	6,500	
	Robert A. van Wyck	1898				
	Abram S. Hewitt	1903	1958	117 × 25 × 10.5	7,000	
	George B. McClellan	1904	1954	117 × 24 × 9.5	7,000	
	James Duane	1908	1959	132 × 28 × 10	9,000	
	Thomas Willett	1908	1959	132 × 28 × 10	9,000	
	Cornelius W. Lawrence	1908	1955	104.5 × 23.5 × 9	7,000	
	Velox	1907	1922	68 × 11.5 × 7		
	William J. Gaynor	1914	1961	118 × 25 × 13.4	7,000	
	John Purroy Mitchel	1921	1966	132 × 27 × 10	9,000	
	Captain Connell	1922	1938	56.5 × 12 × 6.5		
	John J. Harvey	1931	1999	130 × 28 × 9	18,000	now a private excursion vessel
	Fire Fighter	1938	1999	134 × 32 × 9	20,000	Now a museum ship
	Smoke	1938	1955	53 × 7 × 3.5		
	John D. Mc Kean	1954	2010	129 × 30 × 9	19,000	held in retired status
	H. Sylvia A. H. G. Wilks	1958	1972	105.5 × 27 × 9	8,000	
	Harry M. Archer M. D.	1958	1994	105.5 × 27 × 9	8,000	
	Smoke II	1958	2008	52 × 14 × 4	2,000	
	Senator Robert F. Wagner	1959	1993	105.5 × 27 × 9	8,000	
	Governor Alfred E. Smith	1961	2015	105.5 × 27 × 9	8,000	
	John H. Glenn, Jr.	1962	1977	70 × 21 × 5	5,000	Now serving in Washington DC
	John P. Devaney	1992	1994	70 × 19 × 5'4"	7,075	named after John P. Devaney, a firefighter who died in the line of duty
	Alfred E. Ronaldson	1992	1994	70 × 19 × 5'4"	7,075	named after Alfred E. Ronaldson, a firefighter who died in the line of duty
	Kevin C. Kane	1992	2013	52 × 16 × 4.5	6,500	auctioned off after receiving damage during Hurricane Sandy.
	Bravest	2011	-	64 × 17 × 3'4"	6,000	fastest fireboat of its size
	Fire Fighter II	2010	-	140 × 36 × 9	50,000	one of the largest fireboats in North America
	Three Forty Three	2010	-	140 × 36 × 9	50,000	one of the largest fireboats in North America
	William M. Feehan	2015	-	66 × 18 × 3	8,000	40 knots (74 km/h)
