= Bravest (fireboat) =

New York City fireboat (2011-present)

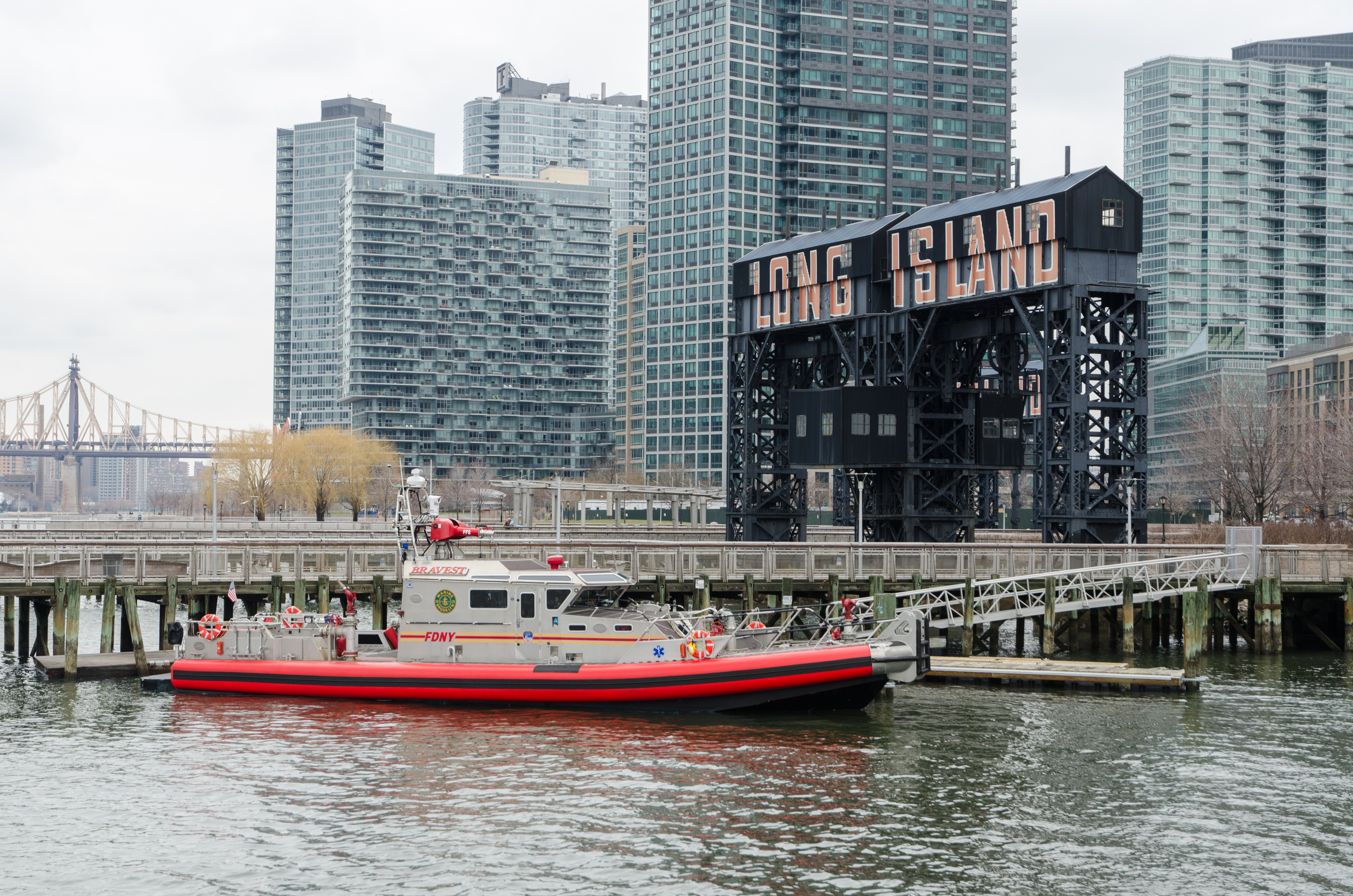

History

New York City Fire Department
- Name: Bravest
- Owner: New York City
- Operator: New York City Fire Department
- Builder: SAFE Boats International
- Cost: $2.4 million
- Commissioned: May 27, 2011

General characteristics
- Class & type: fireboat
- Tonnage: 80,000 pounds (36 t)
- Length: 65 feet (20 m)
- Beam: 17 feet (5.2 m)
- Draft: 3.25 feet (0.99 m)
- Propulsion: waterjets
- Speed: 45 knots (83 km/h)

The Bravest is a fireboat operated by the Fire Department of New York City. She was commissioned on May 27, 2011.

== Background ==
The FDNY currently has four large fireboats, including the Bravest, supplemented by approximately a dozen smaller high speed patrol craft. The two largest fireboats, Firefighter II and Three Forty Three, are among the largest and most powerful fireboats in the world. At 20 knots they are relatively fast. Bravest and FB Feehan, at appx. 65 feet, are comparable in size and power with many cities' largest fireboats, but have the high speed and shallow draft of a modern high speed patrol craft.

Bravest's shallow draft of just 1 metre means she can fight fires in the shallow waters off New York City's airports.

Her nameplate was carved from a plate of steel recovered from the World Trade Center.

Specifications
Length:	65 feet (20 m)
Width:	17 feet (5.2 m)
Draft:	3.25 feet (0.99 m)
Air draft:	14.5 feet (4.4 m)
Speed:	45 knots (83 km/h)
Engines:	3 x 1,000 horsepower (750 kW) diesels
Propulsion	waterjets
Gallons/minute:	6000
Builder:	SAFE Boats International
Cost:	$2.4 million
Tonnage:	80,000 pounds (36 t)

== See also ==
- Fireboats of New York City
