= List of shipwrecks in 2008 =

The list of shipwrecks in 2008 includes ships sunk, foundered, grounded, or otherwise lost during 2008.

table of contents
2008
Jan	Feb	Mar	Apr
May	Jun	Jul	Aug
Sep	Oct	Nov	Dec
Unknown date

== January ==
=== 3 January ===
List of shipwrecks: 3 January 2008
Ship	State	Description
Vanessa	Bulgaria	Carrying a cargo of scrap metal, the cargo ship sank in the Sea of Azov. Nine of her ten crew members were lost.

=== 8 January ===
List of shipwrecks: 8 January 2008
Ship	State	Description
Response	United States	The retired 46-foot (14.0 m) buoy tender was scuttled as an artificial reef in the North Atlantic Ocean 3.6 nautical miles (6.7 km; 4.1 mi) off Sea Girt, New Jersey, at 40°07.931′N 073°56.373′W.

=== 14 January ===
List of shipwrecks: 14 January 2008
Ship	State	Description
Ice Prince	Greece	The cargo ship sank in the English Channel near Devon, while carrying a cargo of more than 5,000 tonnes of timber to Alexandria, Egypt. All the crew members were rescued. The timber came ashore on dozens of beaches along the southern coast of the United Kingdom in counties such as West Sussex, Dover, and Kent.

=== 15 January ===
List of shipwrecks: 15 January 2008
Ship	State	Description
Unidentified cargo ship	Unknown	An unidentified cargo ship bound from Hong Kong for Panama with a cargo of gravel sank approximately 20 nautical miles (37 km) off the coast of Taiwan after being overwhelmed by a wave. Her entire crew of eight – all Chinese – died.

=== 23 January ===
List of shipwrecks: 23 January 2008
Ship	State	Description
"Royalist"	United Kingdom	The 105-foot (32 m) fishing vessel was swamped by waves and sank while fishing 180 nautical miles off Dingle, Ireland. Crew rescued by fishing vessel "Damafran" (France).

=== 29 January ===
List of shipwrecks: 29 January 2008
Ship	State	Description
Gevo Victory	Lebanon	The cargo ship, bound for Beirut, sank off the coast of Lebanon in heavy seas. The frigate Bayern (German Navy), operating in the area as part of the United Nations Interim Force in Lebanon, rescued all on board.
Miss Beth	United States	The retired 80-foot (24.4 m) fishing trawler was scuttled as an artificial reef in the North Atlantic Ocean off Cape May, New Jersey, at 38°53.237′N 074°40.545′W.

=== 31 January ===
List of shipwrecks: 31 January 2008
Ship	State	Description
Riverdance	Bahamas	Riverdance The ferry, en route from Warrenpoint, Northern Ireland, to Heysham, England, developed a severe list in the Irish Sea. Ship was beached at Blackpool, England, and all of the crew and passengers were airlifted to safety.

== February ==
=== 1 February ===
List of shipwrecks: 1 February 2008
Ship	State	Description
Spinningdale	United Kingdom	The Spanish-owned, and British-registered, 82-foot (25 m), 117-ton longlining trawler suffered engine failure and was driven into a group of rocks on Hirta near St Kilda Archepeligo due to Force 9 winds and was declared a constructive total loss. All fourteen of the crew were airlifted to safety by the Stornoway Coastguard. Scrapping in place began in June, 2009 and finished by 8 September.

=== 6 February ===
List of shipwrecks: 6 February 2008
Ship	State	Description
UND Adriyatik	Turkey	UND Adriyatic. The U.N Ro-Ro İşletmeleri A.Ş-owned freighter caught fire in the northern Adriatic Sea. The ship was carrying 200 trucks and nine tonnes of oil derivatives, and all crewmembers and passengers were saved.

=== 9 February ===
List of shipwrecks: 9 February 2008
Ship	State	Description
Velocity	United States	Rescuers working to save the trapped crew of the capsized Velocity. The fishing vessel capsized 200 yards (180 m) off Mill Bay Beach (57°49′30″N 152°20′30″W) near Kodiak, Alaska, then washed ashore with her two-man crew trapped inside her. One of them died, but United States Coast Guard personnel and civilians cut through her hull and rescued the other man.

=== 16 February ===
List of shipwrecks: 16 February 2008
Ship	State	Description
Westward	United States	Westward The 82-foot (25 m) fishing vessel ran aground and sank in Southeast Alaska near Point Ildefonso on the southwest coast of Prince of Wales Island west of Klawock, Alaska. Another fishing vessel rescued both crew members. Westward later was refloated and taken to Craig, Alaska.

=== 22 February ===
List of shipwrecks: 22 February 2008
Ship	State	Description
Transition	United States	The 35-foot (11 m) troller disappeared with the loss of both of crewmen during a voyage in Southeast Alaska from Juneau to Ketchikan. One of the vessel′s doors later was found washed up on Kupreanof Island in Frederick Sound in the Alexander Archipelago.

=== 29 February ===
List of shipwrecks: 29 February 2008
Ship	State	Description
Shourav	Bangladesh	According to ATN Bangla television and a Bangladesh Inland Water Transport Authority report, an overloaded Bangladeshi ferry MV Shourav carrying 100 passengers on board was rammed by a sand cargo, and then sank. This occurred on the Buriganga River, in the outskirts of Dhaka, killing 49.

== March ==
=== 6 March ===
List of shipwrecks: 6 March 2008
Ship	State	Description
Maro	Antigua and Barbuda	Maro. The cargo ship ran aground at Gipuzkoa, Spain. She broke up four days later.

=== 8 March ===
List of shipwrecks: 8 March 2008
Ship	State	Description
Turmoil	United States	During a voyage in Alaska from King Cove to Belkofski Bay, the fishing vessel was destroyed by fire in Volcano Bay (55°13′N 162°00′W) on the southwest end of the Alaska Peninsula 28 miles (45 km) east of Cold Bay. All three of her crewmen reached the beach, where another vessel rescued them.

=== 23 March ===
List of shipwrecks: 23 March 2008
Ship	State	Description
Alaska Ranger	United States	The 184-foot (56.1 m) catcher-processor flooded and sank with the loss of five lives in the Bering Sea approximately 120 nautical miles (220 km; 140 mi) west of Dutch Harbor, Alaska, after losing her rudder. There were 42 survivors; Alaska Ranger′s sister ship Alaska Warrior rescued 22 of them, and a United States Coast Guard helicopter and the high endurance cutter USCGC Douglas Munro ( United States Coast Guard) rescued the other 20.
Naftogaz-67	Ukraine	According to Hong Kong's RTHK, a Ukrainian tugboat, Naftogaz-67, sank and is lying upside-down in 37 metres (121 ft) of water with 18 crewmembers missing after colliding with a Chinese cargo ship Yao-Hai off Tuen Mun.

=== 25 March ===
List of shipwrecks: 25 March 2008
Ship	State	Description
Miss Sonya	United States	While returning to Gloucester, Massachusetts, from a fishing trip to Stellwagen Bank, the 43-foot (13 m) fishing dragger took on water, capsized, and sank in 160 feet (49 m) of water off Gloucester, 3 nautical miles (5.6 km; 3.5 mi) south of Eastern Point at 42°32.767′N 070°40.062′W. Her two-man crew was rescued.
Unknown patrol boat	Sri Lanka Navy	Sri Lankan Civil War: Battle of Kallarawa: The Dvora-class patrol boat was sunk in an attack by six Liberation Tigers of Tamil Eelam explosive motorboats and ten assault boats.

=== 28 March ===
List of shipwrecks: 28 March 2008
Ship	State	Description
Coco Leoni	United Kingdom	The motor cruiser ran aground at Lytham St Annes, Lancashire, England, opposite the windmill.

=== Unknown date ===
List of shipwrecks: Unknown date March 2008
Ship	State	Description
SLNS P-438	Sri Lanka Navy	Sri Lankan Civil War: The patrol boat was sunk by the Liberation Tigers of Tamil Eelam with all hands on 22 or 24 March, at Kallarawa, Sri Lanka.

== April ==
=== 5 April ===
List of shipwrecks: 5 April 2008
Ship	State	Description
Nikko Maru	Japan	According to the Japan Coast Guard and Japanese major television networks, including Nippon Television Network and Tokyo Broadcasting System reporta, the fishing boat sank in stormy conditions in Mutsu Bay, off Aomori, northern Honshu, Japan, killing eight.

=== 7 April ===
List of shipwrecks: 7 April 2008
Ship	State	Description
Lujiao Yu	China	According to Coast Guard of South Korea and South Korean television networks (KBS and SBS) report, a Chinese fishing boat Lujiao Yu sank by overturning after she collided with South Korean freighter Panbless off Mara Island, six Chinese are missing.

=== 11 April ===
List of shipwrecks: 11 April 2008
Ship	State	Description
Tauracavor	United States	The 196-foot (60 m) excavator dredge barge capsized and sank approximately 60 nautical miles (110 km) off the coast of Winyah Bay, South Carolina in 50-knot (93 km/h; 58 mph) winds and heavy seas.

=== 12 April ===
List of shipwrecks: 12 April 2008
Ship	State	Description
Lurong Yu 2177	China	According to a Coast Guard of Japan report, Chinese fishing boat Lurong Yu 2177 sank after colliding with Hong Kong freighter Shinyo Sawako between Kyūshū and Amami Island, in the East China Sea, Japan, killing 16.

=== 30 April ===
List of shipwrecks: 30 April 2008
Ship	State	Description
Assalama	Panama	The wreck of Assalama in May 2009 The passenger ferry sprang a leak in the Atlantic Ocean and was beached at Tarfaya, Morocco. All 113 passengers were rescued, as were her crew.
SLNS P-434	Sri Lanka Navy	Sri Lankan Civil War: The Dvora-class patrol boat was sunk in an attack by Liberation Tigers of Tamil Eelam boats.

== May ==
=== 4 May ===
List of shipwrecks: 4 May 2008
Ship	State	Description
Comandante Sales	Brazil	The Brazilian river boat carrying 80 people, capsized at Solimoes River, on the outskirts of Manacapuru, Amazonas, Brazil, killing 49 people.

=== 10 May ===
List of shipwrecks: 10 May 2008
Ship	State	Description
SLNS A-520	Sri Lanka Navy	Sri Lankan Civil War: The auxiliary ship was sunk by an underwater explosion, probably by the Liberation Tigers of Tamil Eelam using either limpet mines or a semi-submersible.

=== 13 May ===
List of shipwrecks: 13 May 2008
Ship	State	Description
Nazimuddin	Bangladesh	The Bangladeshi double decker ferry Nazimuddin carrying 150 passengers on board sank on the Ghorautura River, Ghoradigha, Kishoregani, 80 kilometres (43 nmi) from Dhaka, killing at least 41.

=== 29 May ===
List of shipwrecks: 29 May 2008
Ship	State	Description
Hillman III	United States	The retired 100-foot (30.5 m) barge was scuttled as an artificial reef in the North Atlantic Ocean 2 nautical miles (3.7 km) off Mantoloking, New Jersey, in 80 feet (24 m) of water at 40°02.970′N 073°59.370′W.
The Girl Patricia	United Kingdom	The Newlyn fishing vessel sunk 28 nautical miles (52 km) northwest of Land's End. All four crew winched to safety by an RNAS Culdrose helicopter.

== June ==
=== 2 June ===
List of shipwrecks: 2 June 2008
Ship	State	Description
Cittie Point	United States	The retired 95-foot (29.0 m) tug was scuttled as an artificial reef in the North Atlantic Ocean off the coast of Delaware at 38°40.540′N 074°43.957′W.
Fells Point	United States	The retired 110-foot (33.5 m) tug was scuttled as an artificial reef in the North Atlantic Ocean off the coast of Delaware at 38°40.540′N 074°43.957′W.
William C. Snow	United States	The retired 55-foot (16.8 m) barge-towing tug was scuttled as an artificial reef in the North Atlantic Ocean off the coast of Delaware at 38°40.540′N 074°43.957′W.

=== 5 June ===
List of shipwrecks: 5 June 2008
Ship	State	Description
Andromeda	United States	The 11-gross ton, 34.6-foot (10.5 m) salmon gillnetter sank in Bechevin Bay (55°00′N 163°23′W) at the southwest tip of the Alaska Peninsula near False Pass, Alaska, after a wave struck her. A United States Coast Guard helicopter rescued her crew of two from the beach.

=== 10 June ===
List of shipwrecks: 10 June 2008
Ship	State	Description
Cricket	United States	The fishing vessel sank in southern Sitka Sound in Southeast Alaska approximately 17 nautical miles (31 km; 20 mi) from Sitka, Alaska. Her crew of two abandoned ship in survival suits and was rescued by the National Oceanic and Atmospheric Administration research ship NOAAS Rainier (United States).

=== 21 June ===
List of shipwrecks: 21 June 2008
Ship	State	Description
NRP Geba	Portuguese Navy	The decommissioned patrol vessel was sunk as a target in the Atlantic Ocean by a RIM-7 Sea Sparrow antiship missile fired by the frigate NRP Vasco da Gama (Portuguese Navy).
Princess of the Stars	Philippines	Princess of the Stars. The motor ferry capsized off Sibyan Island, Philippines, during Typhoon Fengshen. At least 671 people died. The Philippine Coast Guard rescued 76 survivors.

=== 23 June ===
List of shipwrecks: 23 June 2008
Ship	State	Description
Suwa Maru No.58	Japan	The fishing boat capsized off Choshi, Chiba Prefecture, Japan, with 16 people reported dead.

=== 24 June ===
List of shipwrecks: 24 June 2008
Ship	State	Description
Guyona	United Kingdom	Scallop dredger and stern trawler capsized leading to sinking. Sailed from Brixham to fishing grounds south of Little Sark in the Channel Islands. The crew was recovered by the Guernsey lifeboat.

=== 29 June ===
List of shipwrecks: 29 June 2008
Ship	State	Description
USS Horne	United States Navy	The decommissioned Belknap-class guided-missile cruiser was sunk as a target in the Pacific Ocean during RIMPAC 08.

== July ==
=== 4 July ===
List of shipwrecks: 4 July 2008
Ship	State	Description
Myo Pa Pa Tun	Myanmar	According to New Light of Myanmar newspaper report, the Burmese passenger boat Myo Pa Pa Tun, carrying 82 passengers, capsized at Yway River, Myaungmya, Burma, at least 38 killed.

=== 11 July ===
List of shipwrecks: 11 July 2008
Ship	State	Description
USS David R. Ray	United States Navy	The decommissioned Spruance-class destroyer was sunk in the Pacific Ocean as a gunnery and Harpoon missile target by eight United States Navy and Japan Maritime Self-Defense Force ships and three aircraft during RIMPAC 08.

=== 14 July ===
List of shipwrecks: 14 July 2008
Ship	State	Description
USS Cushing	United States Navy	The decommissioned Spruance-class destroyer was sunk as a target in the Pacific Ocean during RIMPAC 08.

=== 16 July ===
List of shipwrecks: 16 July 2008
Ship	State	Description
USS Fletcher	United States Navy	The decommissioned Spruance-class destroyer was sunk as a target by a Mark 48 ADCAP torpedo fired by the submarine HMAS Waller (Royal Australian Navy) in the Pacific Ocean at 23°01′02″N 159°59′09″W during RIMPAC 08.

=== 30 July ===
List of shipwrecks: 30 July 2008
Ship	State	Description
Gladiator	United States	The 42-gross ton, 49.9-foot (15.2 m) salmon seiner capsized and sank in 1,380 feet (420 m) of water in Clarence Strait near Kendrick Bay (54°51′15″N 131°58′00″W) on the southeast end of Prince of Wales Island in the Alexander Archipelago in Southeast Alaska. Other vessels rescued her entire crew of five.

== August ==
=== 8 August ===
List of shipwrecks: 8 January 2008
Ship	State	Description
Smoke II	United States	The retired 52-foot (15.8 m) Fire Department of New York fireboat was scuttled as an artificial reef in the North Atlantic Ocean 3.6 nautical miles (6.7 km; 4.1 mi) off Sea Girt, New Jersey, at 40°07.829′N 073°56.379′W.

=== 12 August ===
List of shipwrecks: 12 August 2008
Ship	State	Description
X-S	United States	The 32-foot (9.8 m) fishing vessel was stranded near Akun Island in the Fox Islands in the eastern Aleutian Islands. All three crew members survived; the fishing vessel Kema Sue (United States) rescued one of them and a United States Coast Guard helicopter rescued the other two.

=== 26 August ===
List of shipwrecks: 26 August 2008
Ship	State	Description
Zeila	South Africa	The fishing trawler ran aground south of Hentiesbaai, and 20 kilometres (12 mi) north of Wlotzbaken, Namibia, in stormy seas after breaking loose from her tow vessel.

== September ==
=== 2 September ===
List of shipwrecks: 2 September 2008
Ship	State	Description
Courier	unknown	Hurricane Gustav: The ship broke loose from her moorings during the hurricane and went aground in the Industrial Canal near Interstate 10, New Orleans.

=== 11 September ===
List of shipwrecks: 11 September 2008
Ship	State	Description
Asgard II	Ireland	The brigantine sank in the Bay of Biscay 20 miles (32 km) southwest of Belle-Île-en-Mer.

=== 15 September ===
List of shipwrecks: 15 September 2008
Ship	State	Description
Hayat N	Turkey	The ferry sank near Bandirma in northwest Turkey, leaving at least one person dead and five others missing.

=== 27 September ===
List of shipwrecks: 27 September 2008
Ship	State	Description
KM Usaha Baru	Indonesia	The Indonesian wooden boat, carrying 77 passengers and crew, capsized after an engine fire off Nakhoda, Maluku, Indonesia, killing nine people.

== October ==
=== 6 October ===
List of shipwrecks: 6 October 2008
Ship	State	Description
USS O'Bannon	United States Navy	The decommissioned Spruance-class destroyer was sunk as a target in the Atlantic Ocean off the coast of Virginia by the ships and aircraft of the USS Dwight D. Eisenhower carrier strike group (United States Navy).

=== 10 October ===
List of shipwrecks: 10 October 2008
Ship	State	Description
Fedra	Liberia	Fedra. The bulk carrier ran aground on Europa Point, Gibraltar and broke in two.

=== 19 October ===
List of shipwrecks: 19 October 2008
Ship	State	Description
Seafire	New Zealand	The out of service 127-foot (39 m), 314-ton trawler, with her engine removed was scuttled off Whale Island in the Bay of Plenty.

=== 22 October ===
List of shipwrecks: 22 October 2008
Ship	State	Description
Katmai	United States	The 93-foot (28.3 m) cod-fishing vessel lost steering and sank in the Bering Sea approximately 100 nautical miles (190 km; 120 mi) west of Adak in the Aleutian Islands after her lazarette flooded during a severe storm. Only four of her 11 crew members were rescued.

=== 23 October ===
List of shipwrecks: 23 October 2008
Ship	State	Description
Ledenik	Croatia	The fish factory ship foundered off Sestrunj, Croatia.

== November ==
=== 1 November ===
List of shipwrecks: 1 November 2008
Ship	State	Description
SLNS Z-142	Sri Lanka Navy	Sri Lankan Civil War: The Arrow-class assault boat was sunk by the Liberation Tigers of Tamil Eelam.

=== 2 November ===
List of shipwrecks: 2 November 2008
Ship	State	Description
Abigail H	United Kingdom	The grab hopper dredger foundered in Heysham Harbour after developing a leak.

=== 18 November ===
List of shipwrecks: 18 November 2008
Ship	State	Description
Ekawat Nava 5	Marshall Islands	The fishing trawler was sunk by the frigate INS Tabar (India) after being identified as a pirate "mother ship". Allegedly, Ekawat Nava 5's crew fired upon Tabar when challenged to stop to be searched.

== December ==
=== 4 December ===
List of shipwrecks: 4 December 2008
Ship	State	Description
Ushuaia	Comoros	The cruise ship hit a rock in Wilhelmina Bay in Antarctica. Her passengers and crew were evacuated by the Chilean Navy.

=== 19 December ===
List of shipwrecks: 19 December 1998
Ship	State	Description
Flying Phantom	United Kingdom	The tug capsized in the Clyde whilst assisting Red Jasmine (Panama) with the loss of three of her four crew. She was declared a constructive total loss.

== Unknown date ==
List of shipwrecks: Unknown date 2008
Ship	State	Description
SLNS A-520	Sri Lanka Navy	Sri Lankan Civil War: The auxiliary ship was sunk by an underwater explosion. It was not clear whether the explosion was due to the detonation of a mine or an attack by a semisubmersible vessel.
Lady Davinia	Malta	The tour boat (formerly a minesweeper) sunk at her moorings at Sliema Creek.
"Louise M"	United Kingdom	The trawler was reportedly lost off the Channel Islands some time in 2008.
