= Fireboats of Chicago =

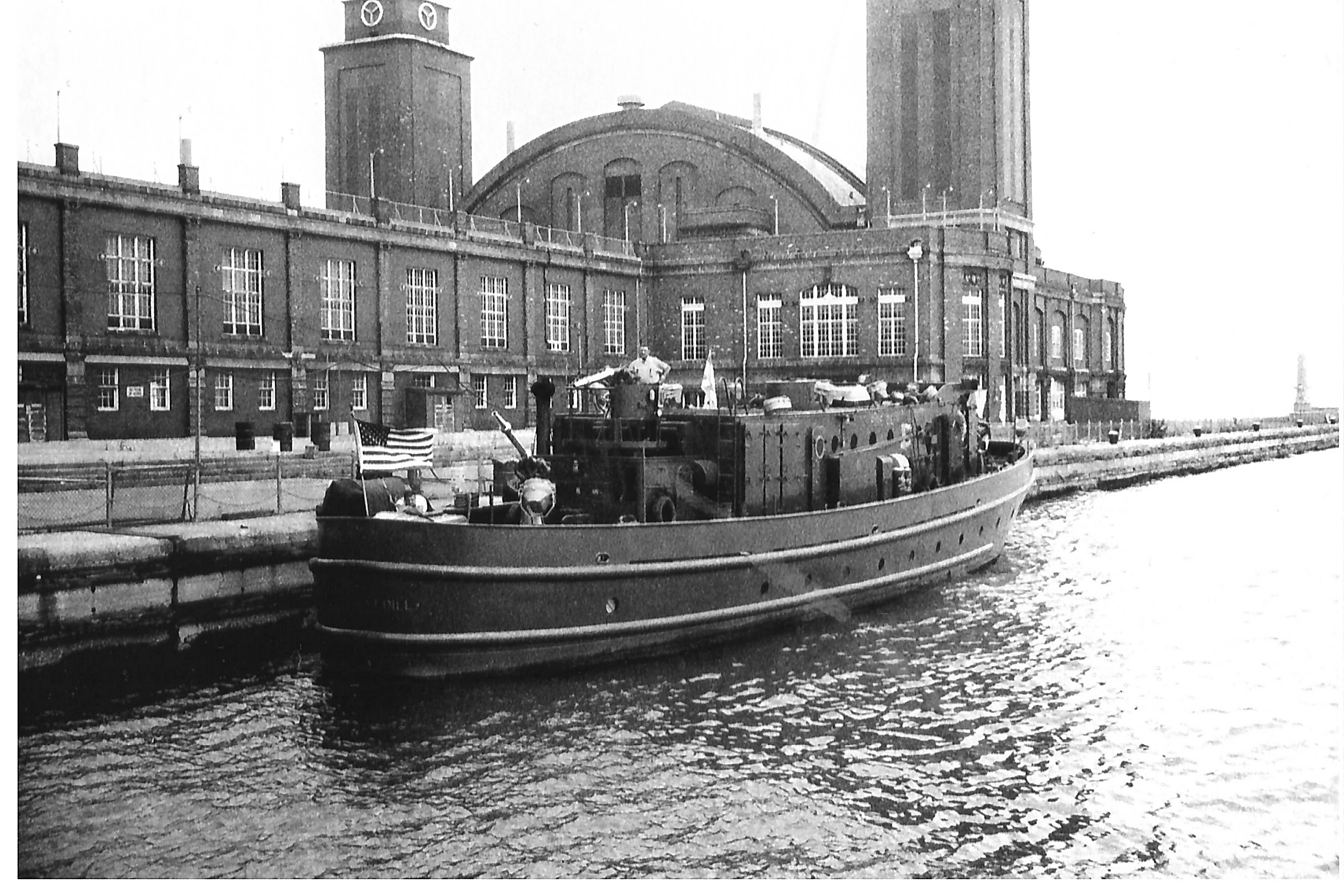
Joseph Medill Fireboat 1967

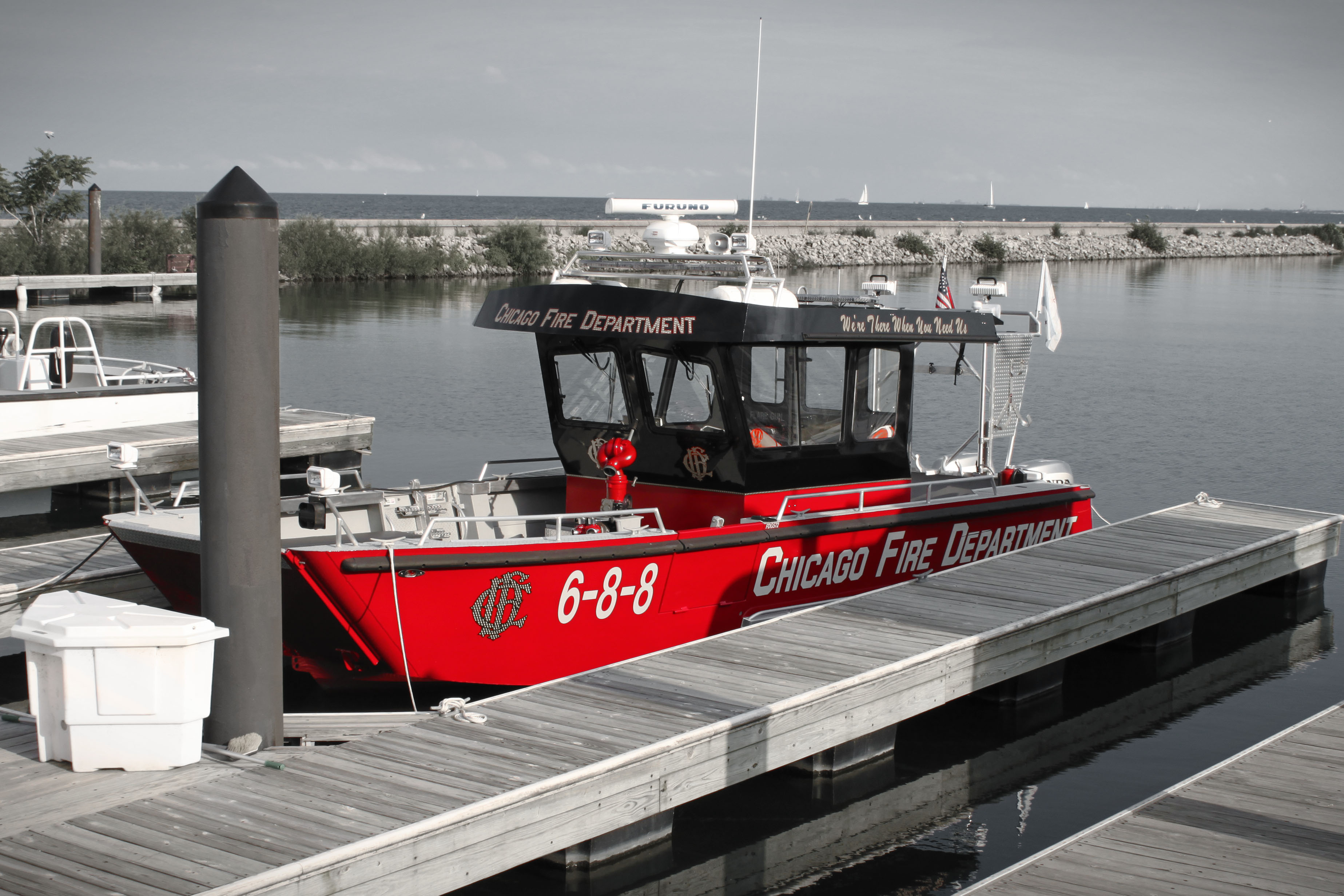
In 1908 the City of Chicago operated a fleet of large steam-powered fireboats, but by the end of the 20th Century they had largely been replaced by smaller, faster, less powerful vessels.

As an important port city, Chicago has operated dedicated fireboats since 1877.

In 1986, the Chicago Tribune offered a history of Chicago's larger fireboats, when the Chicago Fire Department moved the Victor L. Schlaeger from active to standby status. According to that account, by 1908 the city was operating nine fireboats. However that was when many of the buildings that lined the waterfront were still made of wood, and by 1986 most of the factories and warehouses by the waterfront were built of concrete.

Josiah Seymour Currey, in a history of Chicago published in 1912, listed five fireboats operating in the early 1900s.

By 1986 the city had introduced smaller, less powerful fireboats, that required smaller crews, and did not require specially trained and certified mariners to operate them.

When she was commissioned in 2010, the Christopher Wheatley was Chicago's first full-size fireboat in sixty years.

Fireboats operated in Chicago include:
name	commissioned	retired	notes
Alpha	1885		Former tug boat.
Geyser	1886		First of Chicago's fleet designed to be a fireboat.; renamed the Denis J. Swenie in 1903.
Chicago	188?		
Yosemite	1890		Same size as, but more powerful than the Geyser.; Her name was changed to Protector in 1903.; Her name was changed to Michael W. Conway in 1907.
Fire Queen	1892	1905	Built to fight fires on the site of the 1893 Chicago's World's Fair.; Turned over to the city when the fair closed.
Illinois	1899		Chicago's first fireboat with a steel hull, instead of a wooden hull.; Sank during the Burlington Grain elevator fire, but was quickly refloated and put back into service.
Joseph Medill	1908-06	1947-01	According to Fire Strikes the Chicago Stock Yards the Joseph Medill and Graeme Stewart were built in the same yard in Manitowoc, Wisconsin, at the same time, and were "twins".
Graeme Stewart	1909		According to Fire Strikes the Chicago Stock Yards the Joseph Medill and Graeme Stewart were built in the same yard in Manitowoc, Wisconsin, at the same time, and were "twins".
Fred A. Busse	1937	1981	Converted to an excursion boat.
Joseph Medill	1948		The 1948 Joseph Medill was a sister ship to the Victor L. Schlaeger. Now wreck in Escanaba, MI
Victor L. Schlaeger	1949	2010	Built by Christy Corp, Sturgen Bay, WI.
fireboat 6-8-8			
Christopher Wheatley	2010		Especially designed to navigate a city with shallow rivers and low bridges.
Eugene Blackmon	2017		33 feet (10 m) "Boston Whaler Conquest Hull" "fast assault craft"; Named for firefighter and scuba diver Eugene Blackmon Jr., who died on duty
