= John McKean =

John McKean may refer to:

- John McKean (ornithologist) (1941–1996), Australian ornithologist
- John D. McKean (fireboat), a 1954 fireboat serving the New York City Fire Department
- John McKean (politician) (1868–?), Member of Parliament for South Monaghan, 1902–1918
