= Kevin Kane =

Kevin Kane may refer to:

- Kevin Kane (American football) (born 1983), American football coach and former player
- Kevin Kane (actor), American actor, director and producer
- Kevin Kane (musician), Canadian songwriter, musician, and record producer
- Kevin C. Kane, formerly an FDNY fireboat
