= Versluis =

Versluis is a Dutch surname. It is a collapsed version of Van der Sluis" meaning "from the locks / sluice". As such, it could have a toponymic origin or could be a metonymic occupational surname (the lock keeper). Variant forms are Versluijs and Versluys. The concentration of the latter form around the town Sluis in Zeelandic Flanders may suggest an origin in that town instead. Notable people with the surname include:

Versluis

- Arthur Versluis (born 1959), American esotericism and transcendentalism researcher
- Johan Versluis (born 1983), Dutch footballer
- Matthias Versluis (born 1994), Finnish figure skater
- Mechiel Versluis (born 1987), Dutch rower

Versluijs/Versluys

- Annette Versluys-Poelman (1853–1914), Dutch suffragist and philanthropist
- Elisabeth Versluys (1923–2011), Dutch television and theater actress
- Jan Versluys (1873–1939), Dutch zoologist
- Patrick Versluys (born 1958), Belgian racing cyclist
- Stephanus Versluijs (1694–1736), Dutch Governor of Ceylon 1729–1732

== See also ==
- James J. Versluis, a Chicago tugboat named in 1957 after Chicago's engineer of water works James J. Versluis
- Versluys Arena, a multi-use stadium in Ostend, Belgium
