= Victor L. Schlaeger =

Retired Chicago Fire Department fireboat

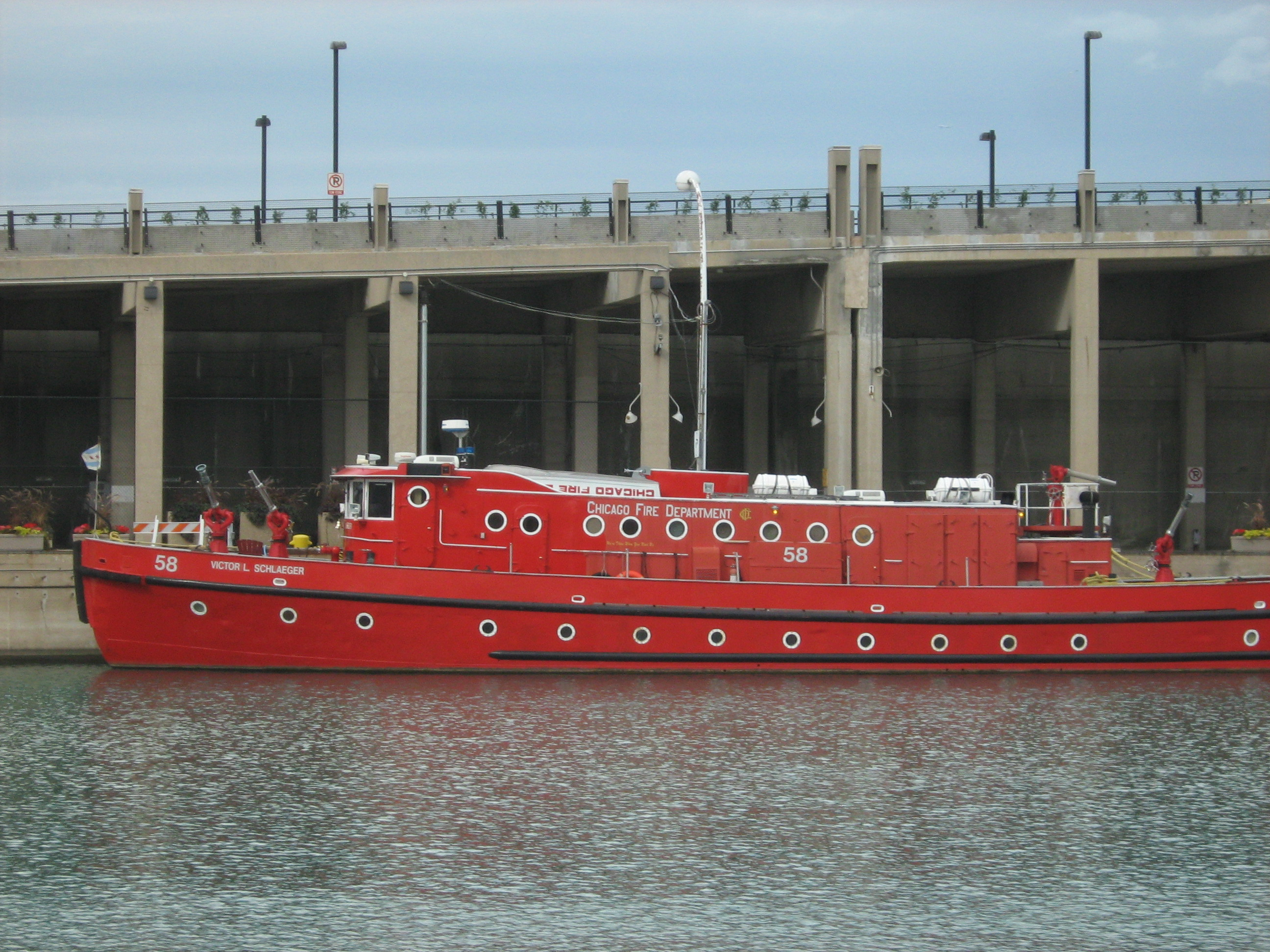
Chicago fire boat Victor L. Schlaeger

The Victor L. Schlaeger was a fireboat operated by the Chicago Fire Department from 1949 to 2010. While the city of Chicago had once operated nine powered fireboats, in the early 20th century, towards the end of her working life the Schlaeger was Chicago's sole large fireboat. She was supplemented by smaller, faster, but less capable boats. In 1986 she was retired from active to standby status, at a considerable savings in personnel, as she had been staffed 24 hours per day by a crew of eight.

She was replaced by the Christopher Wheatley in 2010.

== See also ==
- Fireboats of Chicago
