= Christopher Wheatley =

Chicago fireboat

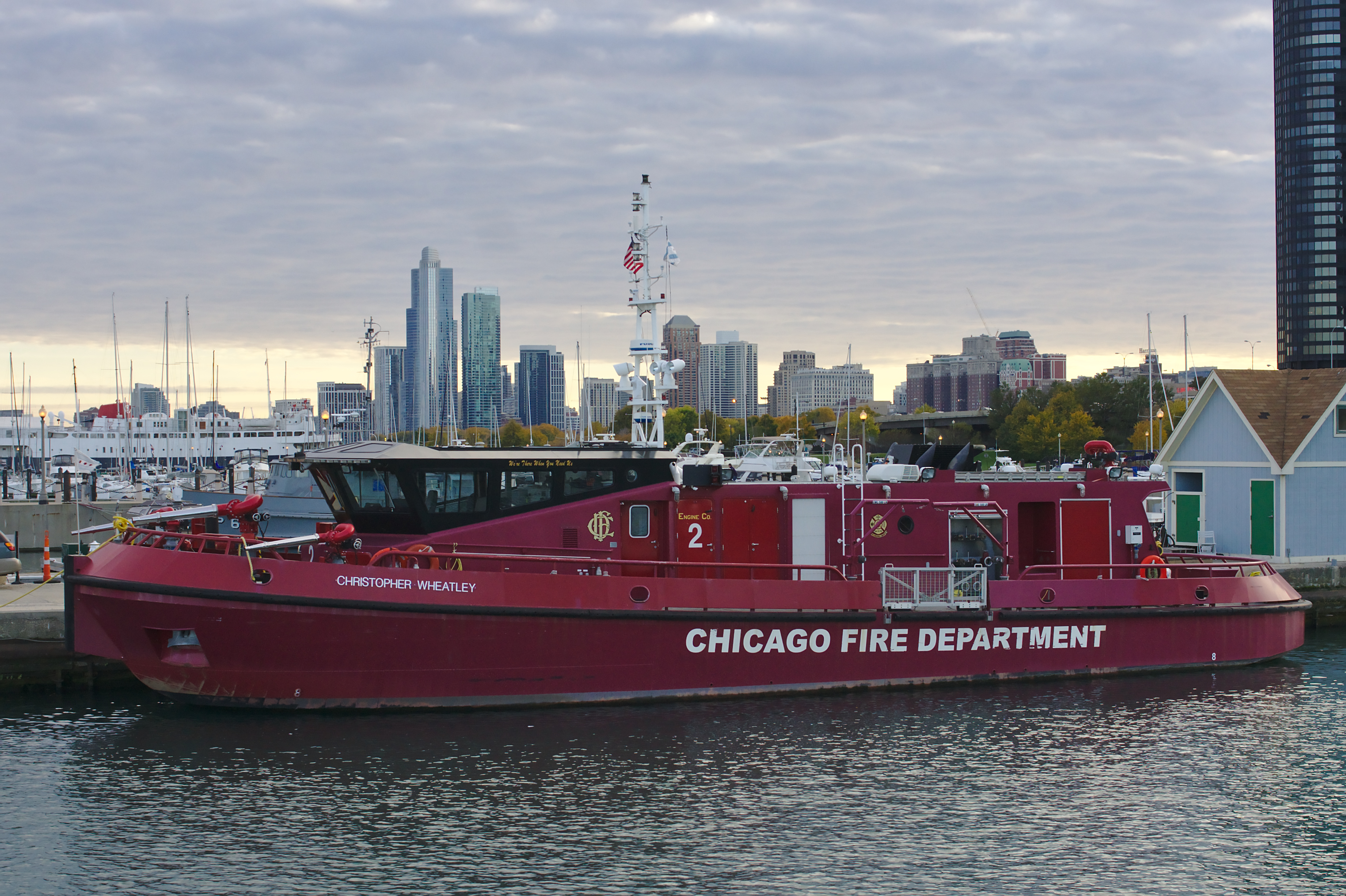
Chicago Fire Department fireboat Christopher Wheatley (2015)

The Christopher Wheatley is a fireboat delivered to the Chicago Fire Department in 2011. When she was delivered in April 2011, she was the first new fireboat to serve the city in sixty years. She replaced the Victor L. Schlaeger.

The vessel was, coincidentally, built in Wheatley, Ontario, and was named after a young Chicago firefighter who had died in the line of duty on August 9, 2010.

The vessel was designed specifically to function in an environment like Chicago, where she would be required to navigate shallow rivers, and pass under low bridges. She has four diesel engines, two of which are dedicated to powering her four water cannons. A water cannon on her aft deck is on an extensible mast that can be raised to a height of 30 feet, if required, but can be lowered to pass under low bridges. Her radio mast can also be lowered, for passing under low bridges. Her water cannons can project 15,000 gallons per minute.

The Fire Department maintains crew on the vessel 24 hours a day, seven days a week.

The vessel was designed by Canadian Naval Architects Robert Allan Ltd. and built in the Canadian shipyards of Hike Metal Products.

Chicago keeps the lower reaches of the Chicago River clear of ice, during the winter, so service vessels, like the Christopher Wheatley can transit it, during emergencies. While she is capable of breaking ice usually the city-owned tugboat James J. Versluis performs this duty. In 2021, the Christopher Wheatley was put into use breaking ice on the Chicago River, while the James J. Versluis was in charge of breaking ice on Lake Michigan.

Specifications
length	27.42 metres (90.0 ft)
beam	7.62 metres (25.0 ft)
displacement	300 tons
propulsion	2 x 1,081 kilowatts (1,450 hp) diesel engines
firefighting equipment	2 x 745 kilowatts (999 hp) diesels to power the pumps 4 x remote controlled water cannons 22 connectors for external fire hoses
speed	13 knots
ice breaking capability	up to 30 centimetres (0.98 ft)
cost	$8.5 million

== See also ==
- Fireboats of Chicago
