= Geyser (fireboat, 1886) =

The Geyser was a steam powered fireboat built for Chicago, Illinois in 1886. Chicago had operated three earlier vessels, as fireboats, but they had all been retrofits. The Geyser was specifically designed as a fireboat, after Fire Marshall Denis J. Swenie visited eastern cities to learn from their purpose-built fireboats.

The vessel was designed to be able to break ice, as necessary, so it could operate in the winter.

When Chicago added the Yosemite to its fleet of fireboats, it was reported to have been the same size as the Geyser, but "...has more power as a waterthrower."

In 1903 the Geyser was renamed the Denis J. Swenie.
