= Robert Allan Ltd. =

Canadian naval architecture and marine engineering company

- Type: Private Company
- Industry: Naval Architecture and Marine Engineering
- Founded: 1928
- Founder: Robert Allan
- Headquarters: Vancouver, British Columbia, Canada
- Key people: Mike Fitzpatrick, President; Robert G. Allan, P.Eng, Executive Chairman of the Board
- Number of employees: 100
- Website: www.ral.ca

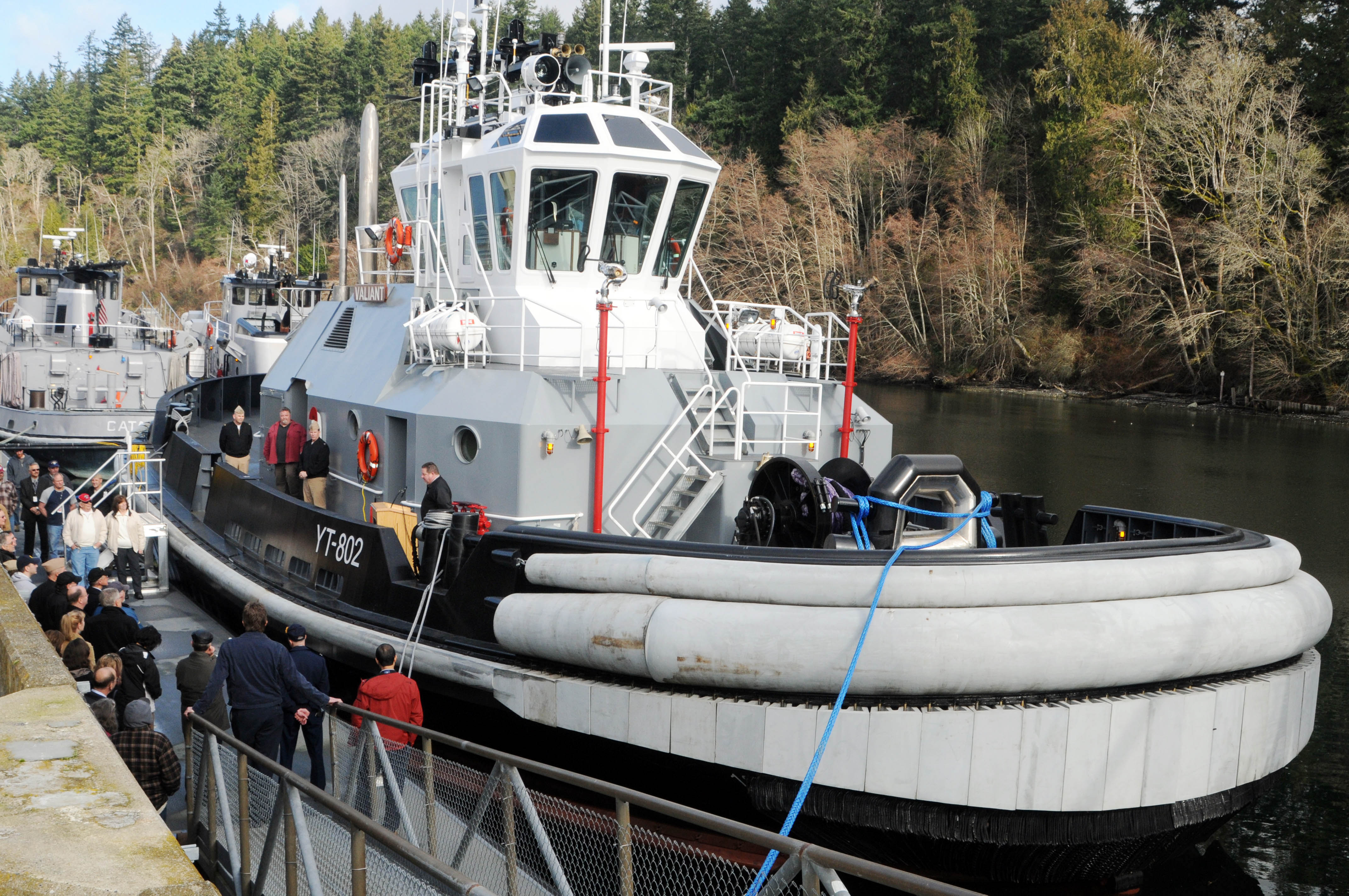
US Navy vessel Valiant (YT-802)

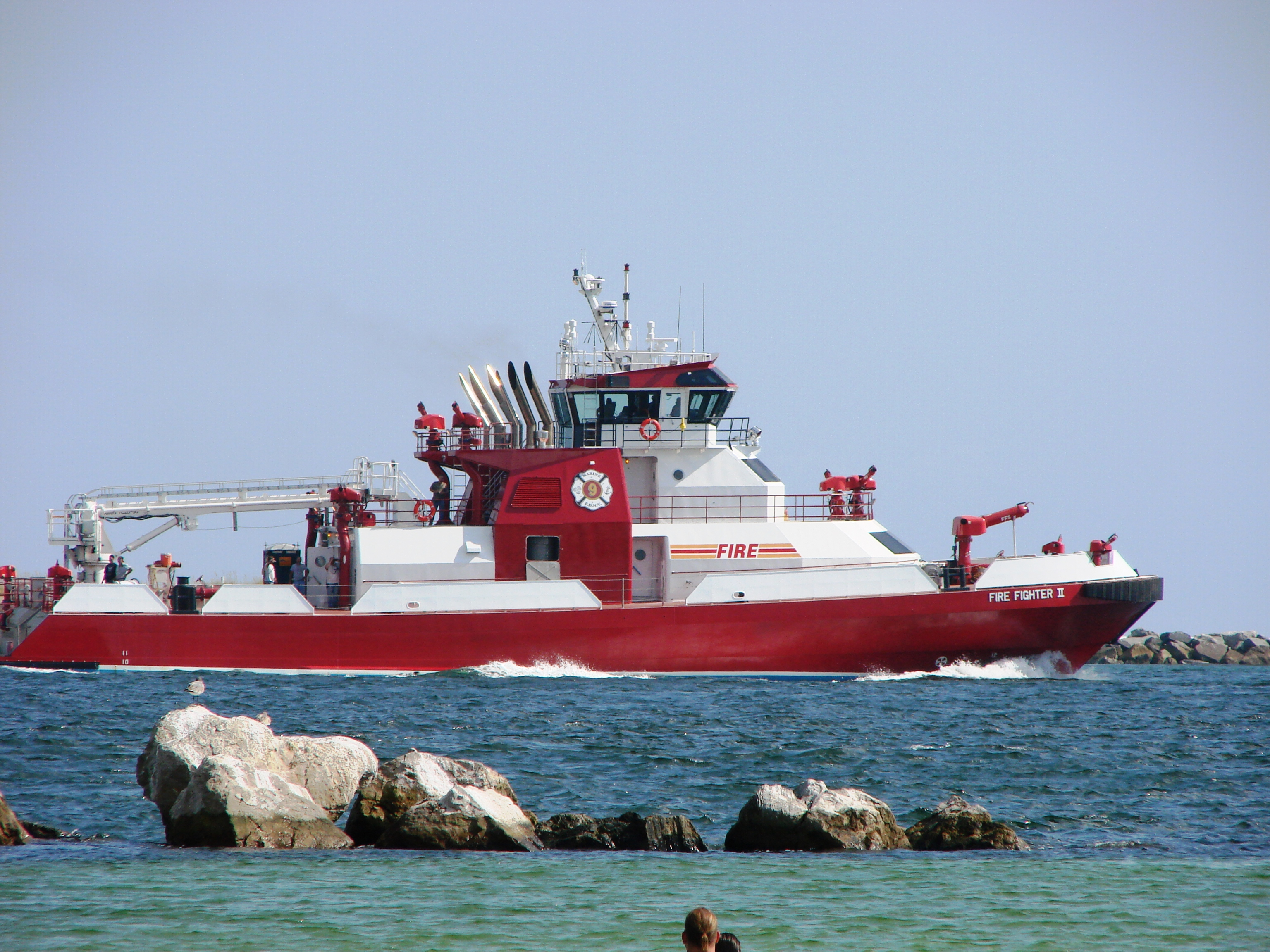
FDNY vessel Fire Fighter II

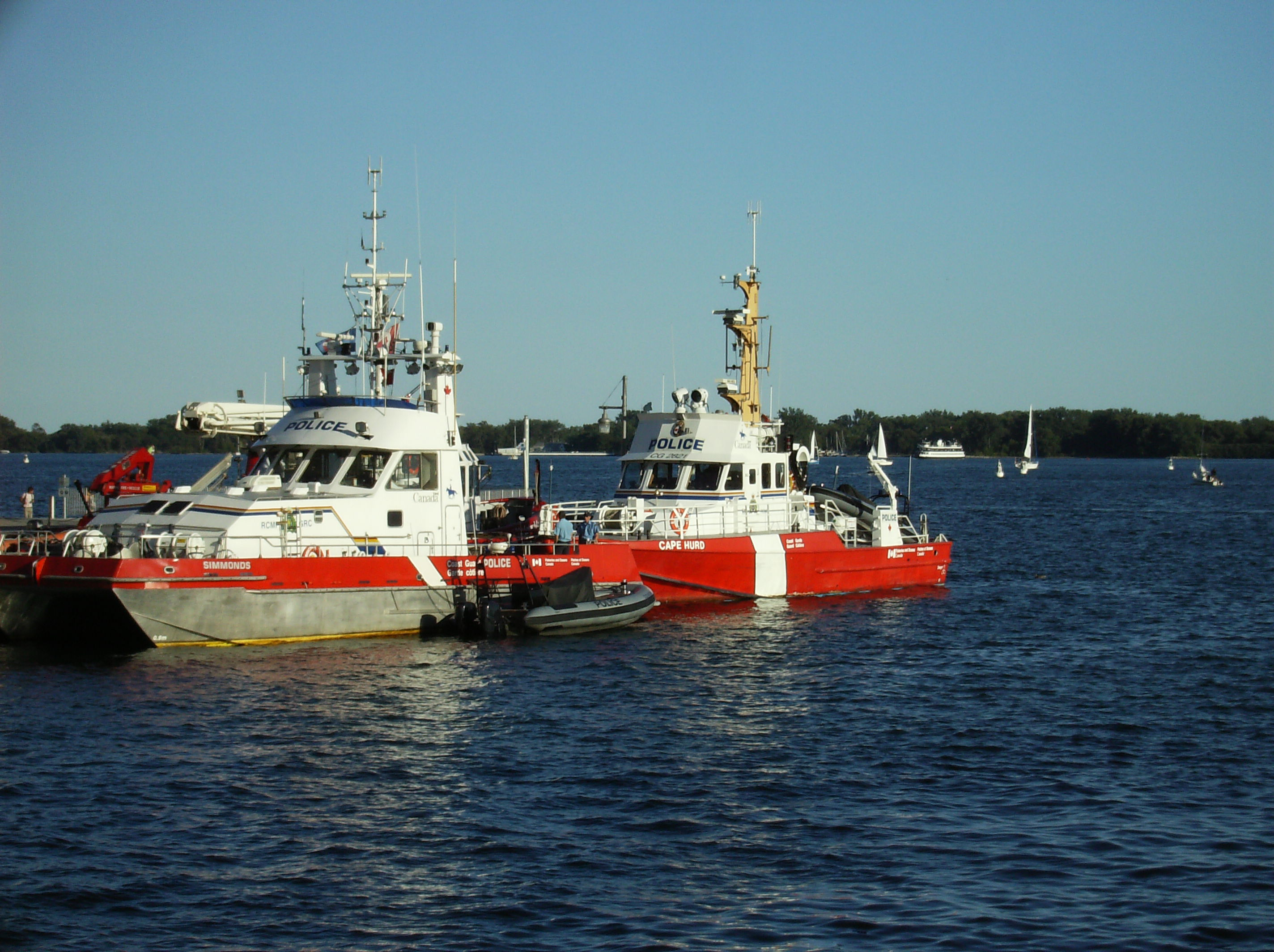
RCMP-CCG vessel Simmonds with CCGS Cape Hurd

Robert Allan Ltd. is Canada's oldest privately owned consulting Naval Architectural firm, established in Vancouver, British Columbia in 1930. Their experience includes designs for vessels of almost all types, from small fishing boats to ocean-going ferries. The firm is best known for its work in the fields of tug and barge transportation, ship-assist and escort tugs, fast patrol craft, fireboats and shallow-draft vessels. They provide professional marine consulting and design services to a worldwide client base.

== History ==
- 1930 - Robert Allan began private practice as a Consulting Naval Architect. He produced designs for the British Columbia fishing fleet and for coastal ferry services, among others.
- 1946 - Robert F. Allan joined his father in the practice. The business developed specialized tugs and barges for the forestry and mining industries along the B.C. coast.
- 1962 - Robert Allan Ltd. was incorporated.
- 1973 - Robert G. Allan joined the company.
- 1981 - Robert G. Allan succeeded his father as President, bringing computer-based design technology into use with a variety of designs for high-performance ship-assist and escort tugs, icebreakers, government service vessels, and high speed craft.
- 2008 - The company was restructured with employee ownership, making eleven of Robert Allan Ltd.'s core group of senior employees shareholders in the firm. Robert G. Allan became Executive Chairman of the Board, remaining involved in the day-to-day operations and providing an advisory role to the new group of owners.

== See also ==
- Miscaroo and Ikaluk
- Warner L. Lawrence
- Three Forty Three
- Fire Fighter II
- Christopher Wheatley
- American United
- RCMP Marine Craft
- Valiant-class tugboat
