= Joseph Medill (1908) =

Chicagoan fireboat

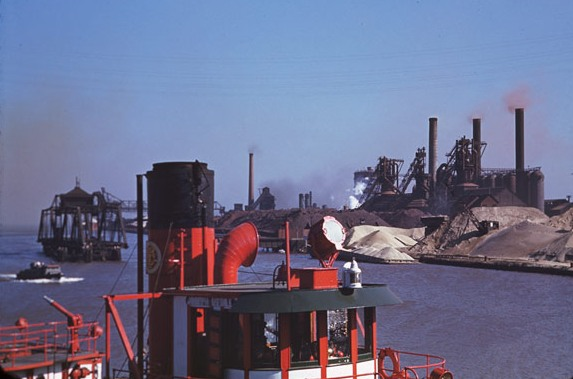
The Joseph Medill

The fireboat Joseph Medill was commissioned in Chicago, Illinois, in 1908, and was the first of two Chicago fireboats of that name—the second being commissioned in 1949. When she was commissioned, she joined five other fireboats.

According to Fire Strikes the Chicago Stock Yards, the Joseph Medill and Graeme Stewart were built in the same yard in Manitowoc, at the same time, and were "twins".

In 1963, crew member Thomas McKnight was knocked overboard during a celebratory display of her water cannons. Other crew members did not notice, and McKnight drowned.

== See also ==
- Fireboats of Chicago
