= Eugene Blackmon Jr. =

American firefighter and scuba diver

- Born: July 31, 1959; Chicago
- Died: May 19, 1998 (aged 38); Chicago
- Occupation: firefighter
- Known for: Died in the line of duty

Eugene Blackmon Jr. was a Chicago firefighter and scuba diver, who died in the course of duty, on May 19, 1998. On July 31, 2017, the Chicago Fire Department named a new fireboat the Eugene Blackmon, in his honor.

== Early life ==
Blackmon was born in Chicago, and grew up on Chicago's south side. He attended Harlan High School, Chicago State University, and qualified to work as a lifeguard and a scuba instructor.

== Career ==
Prior to joining the Chicago Fire Department, in 1987, Blackmon had worked for several years as a lifeguard, and later was a bus driver for the Chicago Transit Authority.

== Death ==
After a man was reported to have accidentally entered the Little Calumet River, and another man disappeared, after diving in, in a rescue attempt, Blackmon and three other Fire Department divers were assigned to look for them.

During his third dive Blackmon surfaced, with his equipment askew. Colleagues weren't able to immediately retrieve him. When he was retrieved he had been submerged for ten minutes, after being airlifted to a nearby hospital he was pronounced dead on arrival.

== Legacy ==
The Chicago Fire Department created an annual award in Blackmon's name, given to firefighter candidates who were perceived to have shown leadership.

On July 31, 2017, Blackmon's family participated in the christening of new fireboat, named after Blackmon.
