= Zhong Shan Da Xue Ji Di =

Chinese research vessel

History

Canada
- Name: Ikaluk (1983–1995); Canmar Ikaluk (1995–1998)
- Namesake: Inupiaq for "fish"
- Owner: BeauDril (Gulf Canada Resources) (1983–1993); Canadian Marine Drilling Ltd. (1993–1998)
- Port of registry: Vancouver, British Columbia
- Ordered: December 1979
- Builder: Nippon Kōkan K. K. Tsurumi Shipyard, Japan
- Yard number: 1007
- Laid down: 20 September 1982
- Launched: 15 November 1982
- Completed: 27 April 1983
- In service: 1983–1998
- Fate: Sold to Russia

Russia
- Name: Ikalu (1998–1999); Smit Sibu (1999–2012); Ikaluk (2012–2018)
- Owner: Smit International (1998–2009); FEMCO Management (2009–2018)
- Port of registry: Kholmsk
- In service: 1998–2018
- Fate: Sold to China

China
- Name: Beijing Ocean Leader (2018–2021); Zhong Shan Da Xue Ji Di (2021–present)
- Owner: Liang Hong (2018–2021); Sun Yat-sen University (2021–present)
- Port of registry: Monrovia, Liberia
- Identification: Call sign: D5JB2; IMO number: 8130693; MMSI number: 636017048
- Status: In service

General characteristics (as built)
- Type: Icebreaker, AHTS
- Tonnage: 3,227 GT; 968 NT; 1,200 DWT (design draught)
- Displacement: 5,050 tons
- Length: 78.85 m (259 ft)
- Beam: 17.22 m (56 ft)
- Draught: 7.5 m (25 ft) (design)
- Depth: 9.7 m (32 ft)
- Ice class: CASPPR Arctic Class 4
- Installed power: 4 × Wärtsilä Vasa 8R32 (4 × 3,725 hp)
- Propulsion: Two shafts; controllable pitch propellers
- Speed: 15.5 knots (28.7 km/h; 17.8 mph) (4 engines); 12.5 knots (23.2 km/h; 14.4 mph) (2 engines); 3–4 knots (5.6–7.4 km/h; 3.5–4.6 mph) in 1.2 m (4 ft) ice
- Crew: 6 officers; 16 crew; 12 passengers

Zhong Shan Da Xue Ji Di
- Traditional Chinese: 中山大學極地
- Simplified Chinese: 中山大学极地
- Literal meaning: Sun Yat-sen University Polar
Transcriptions
Standard Mandarin
- Hanyu Pinyin: Zhōngshān Dàxué jídì
- IPA: [ʈʂʊ́ŋ.ʂán tâ.ɕɥě tɕǐ.tî]

Alternative Chinese name
- Traditional Chinese: 北京號破冰船
- Simplified Chinese: 北京号破冰船
- Literal meaning: Beijing-named icebreaker ship
Transcriptions
Standard Mandarin
- Hanyu Pinyin: Běijīng hào pòbīngchuán

Zhong Shan Da Xue Ji Di (simplified Chinese: 中山大学极地; traditional Chinese: 中山大學極地; pinyin: Zhōngshān Dàxué jídì; lit. 'Sun Yat-sen University Polar') is a Chinese icebreaker owned by the Sun Yat-sen University. She was built in 1983 as an icebreaking anchor handling tug supply vessel (AHTS) Ikaluk for BeauDril, the drilling subsidiary of Gulf Canada Resources, to support offshore oil exploration in the Beaufort Sea. In the 1990s, the vessel was acquired by Canadian Marine Drilling (Canmar) and renamed Canmar Ikaluk. In 1998, she was purchased by Smit International and served in the Sakhalin oil fields as Smit Sibu. In 2009, she was acquired by FEMCO Management and in 2012 given back her original name. Ikaluk was sold to China in February 2018 and renamed Beijing Ocean Leader (Chinese: 北京号破冰船). In late 2021, the vessel was acquired by its current owner and given its current name.

== History ==
=== Development and construction ===
In the mid-1970s, oil companies began drilling in the Canadian part of the Beaufort Sea. In order to overcome the relatively short operating window of drillships during the ice-free season (100 to 110 days a year) and the water depth limitations of artificial dredged islands, Gulf Canada Resources began developing an Arctic drilling system consisting of two mobile drilling units: a Mobile Arctic Caisson (MAC) that could be submerged and filled with gravel to form an artificial drilling island in waters up to 40 metres (130 ft) in depth and a floating Conical Drilling Unit (CDU) designed for drilling in water depths between 40 and 60 metres (130 and 200 ft) while afloat. These units, each capable of completing one exploration well per year, would be supported by four Arctic Class 4 vessels: two large icebreakers providing 24-hour ice management and standby services on the drilling site and two smaller icebreaking vessels responsible for anchor handling and supply runs between the drilling rigs and coastal bases. By 1982, both drilling units and all four icebreaking vessels were under construction in Canada and Japan for BeauDril, Gulf Canada's drilling subsidiary, and the company had committed itself to a billion-dollar exploration program between 1983 and 1988.

The smaller icebreakers were designed by the Canadian naval architecture company Robert Allan Ltd and the construction of one vessel was awarded to the Japanese Nippon Kōkan K. K. Tsurumi Shipyard in December 1979. The keel of the vessel was laid on 20 September 1982 and she was launched only few months later on 15 November 1982 as Ikaluk. The name, Inupiaq for "fish", had been chosen in a naming contest by Northern Territories school children. She was completed on 27 April 1983 and immediately headed for the Beaufort Sea.

Ikaluk's sister ship, Miscaroo, was built at Vancouver Shipyards in Vancouver, British Columbia and delivered in July 1983. Despite having been built at two different shipyards on the opposite sides of the world, the two vessels were nearly identical with most of the major components being supplied by Gulf Canada to both shipyards. These vessels were the first Canadian Arctic vessels powered by diesel engines manufactured by Wärtsilä.

=== Ikaluk and Canmar Ikaluk (1983–1998) ===
Between 1983 and 1990, BeauDril's mobile drilling units drilled a total of nineteen exploratory wells in the Canadian part of the Beaufort Sea with the support of Ikaluk and other icebreaking vessels: nine with the Mobile Arctic Caisson Molikpaq and ten with the Conical Drilling Unit Kulluk. Twelve wells alone were drilled in the Amauligak prospect, the most significant oil and gas field discovered in the region, but the high expectations for the Beaufort Sea were not met: the area was characterized by a large number of small, widely scattered resources. Molikpaq was mothballed after completing the last well in 1990. However, Kulluk was used to drill a total of four wells in 1992 and 1993 for ARCO Alaska on the American part of the Beaufort Sea before being cold-stacked at Tuktoyaktuk.

When Ikaluk left the Beaufort Sea in 1990, it completed an eastbound transit on the Northwest Passage that had begun in 1983.

In 1993, BeauDril's flotilla of drilling rigs, icebreakers and support vessels was purchased by Canadian Marine Drilling (Canmar). The drilling subsidiary of Dome Petroleum (later Amoco Canada) had been BeauDril's main competitor in the Beaufort Sea for more than a decade and the merger of two former rivals created the world's largest fleet of commercial Arctic vessels. Despite declining activity in the Canadian Arctic, Amoco saw Canmar and its expertise as a long-term asset and tried to find work for Ikaluk (Canmar Ikaluk since 1995), from other areas such as the North Sea.

In 1995, Canmar Ikaluk was chartered by Cominco to shuttle supplies from Nanisivik to the Polaris mine when the cargo ships couldn't reach Little Cornwallis Island. In total, the vessel made five round trips.

=== Smit Sibu and Ikaluk (1998–2018) ===
In the end, Amoco could not make profit from maintaining Canmar and sold the company's remaining assets, including Canmar Ikaluk, in 1997 to an international consortium of shipping companies. After having been reflagged to Bahamas and renamed Ikalu for a brief period of time, the vessel was first chartered and later purchased by the Dutch company Smit International in 1998. On the following year, she was named Smit Sibu and reflagged to Russia. At the same time, the company also purchased Ikaluk's sister ship, Miscaroo, in 1998 and renamed her Smit Sakhalin.

The two former Canadian offshore icebreakers were deployed together at the Vityaz Production Complex during the first phase of the Sakhalin-2 project in the seasonally frozen Sea of Okhotsk. In addition to providing year-round supply services for the Piltun-Astokhskoye-A platform (the former Molikpaq), they served as ice management and standby vessels for the floating storage and offloading (FSO) vessel Okha and its single anchor leg mooring (SALM) buoy. The icebreakers were used to assist the raising and lowering of the SALM buoy and the beginning and end of the production season, and to support loading operations together with other icebreaking vessels until the ice conditions became too severe. The management of Smit Sibu was transferred to the Russian company FEMCO Management in 2006 and, after having been relieved by her sister ship, headed to Singapore for conversion to a dedicated stand-by vessel at Keppel Tuas shipyard. Her ownership was transferred to FEMCO in 2009 and she was given back her original name, Ikaluk, in 2012.

Ikaluk was reportedly sold for scrap in February 2018. Her sister ship, Smit Sakhalin, had already been broken up in the previous year.

=== Beijing Ocean Leader (2018–2021) ===
Instead of being broken up for scrap, Ikaluk was purchased by Zhang Xinyu and Liang Hong, the people associated with the Chinese reality show On the Road, to serve as an unofficial research vessel. The icebreaker was renamed Beijing Ocean Leader (Chinese: 北京号破冰船) and reflagged to Liberia.

Following a 23 million yuan (US$3.3 million) refit in Zhoushan, the vessel departed on a scientific mission to Antarctica on 16 January 2020 and reached Ross Sea on 23 February. After carrying out research activities and collecting air, water and soil samples, Beijing Ocean Leader returned to China on 21 April. Due to the COVID-19 pandemic, the vessel did not stop in foreign ports along the voyage.

=== Zhong Shan Da Xue Ji Di (2021–) ===
In late 2021, Beijing Ocean Leader was donated to Sun Yat-sen University and renamed Zhong Shan Da Xue Ji Di (Chinese: 中山大学极地).

In 2024, Zhong Shan Da Xue Ji Di made a research voyage to the Arctic at the same time with Xue Long 2 and Ji Di. The vessel departed Guangzhou on 26 July and returned on 7 October, covering a distance of about 11,500 nautical miles (21,300 km; 13,200 mi) of which 1,473 nautical miles (2,728 km; 1,695 mi) was in ice-covered waters.

In January 2025, Zhong Shan Da Xue Ji Di embarked on a scientific research mission in the seasonally-freezing Bohai Sea.

== Design ==
=== General characteristics ===
Zhong Shan Da Xue Ji Di is 78.85 metres (259 ft) long overall and 75.50 metres (248 ft) at the waterline. She has a moulded beam of 17.22 metres (56 ft) at the widest point of the hull and 16.6 metres (54 ft) at the waterline. The vessel has a light displacement of 3,650 tons but when loaded to the design draught of 7.5 metres (25 ft), she displaces 5,050 tons of water. Her icebreaking hull form, developed at the Hamburgische Schiffbau-Versuchsanstalt (HSVA) ice tank in Hamburg, Germany, features a heavy forefoot wedge to deflect ice floes and large bossings to protect propellers and rudders from damage, and is strengthened to Canadian Arctic Shipping Pollution Prevention Regulations (CASPPR) Arctic Class 4 requirements. The hull is made of high strength steel sourced from Japan, resistant to cold ambient temperatures down to −50 °C (−58 °F), and coated with the low-friction Inerta 160 epoxy paint.

As built, the vessel had accommodation for six officers and 16 crew members in single cabins. In addition, she was provided with two six-person cabins for 12 passengers commuting between oil rigs and coastal bases. Designed to provide the drilling units with bulk cement, fuel oil and drinking water, the vessel had cargo tanks and an open 450-square-metre (4,800 sq ft) cargo deck abaft of the deckhouse. Her hydraulic quadruple-drum waterfall-type winch was used to tow Kulluk, BeauDril's ice-strengthened drilling unit, as well as deploy and retrieve its anchors at the drilling site.

=== Power and propulsion ===
Zhong Shan Da Xue Ji Di has a diesel-mechanical propulsion system with four medium-speed diesel engines driving two shafts through twin input-single output gearboxes. The main engines are eight-cylinder Wärtsilä Vasa 8R32 medium-speed diesel engines rated at 3,750 hp (2,800 kW) each. The flexible couplings in the Lohmann & Stolterfoht Model GVA 1400 SO single-stage reduction gearboxes allow choosing between fuel-saving cruise in open water using two engines or full icebreaking power with all four engines running. The four-bladed stainless steel controllable pitch propellers, manufactured by LIPS Canada, have a diameter of 3.75 metres (12 ft) and are placed in fixed nozzles. For maneuvering, the vessel has twin rudders, a 1,200 hp (890 kW) OmniThruster water jet thruster in the bow and an 800 hp (600 kW) KaMeWa tunnel thruster in the stern. Onboard electricity is produced by two 530 hp (395 kW) Caterpillar auxiliary diesel generators or a smaller 130 hp (100 kW) Caterpillar 3404 diesel generator which is intended to be used when the vessel is at dock. In addition, the gearboxes incorporate 1,200 kVA shaft alternators.

At full power, the vessel is designed to break 1.2-metre (3.9 ft) level ice with a speed of 3–4 knots (5.6–7.4 km/h; 3.5–4.6 mph). The icebreaking is further assisted by an active hull lubrication system incorporated to the OmniThruster unit: nozzles along the forward half-length of the vessel can be used to eject air/water mixture between the hull and the ice to prevent the vessel from becoming stuck in ice. In open water, the icebreaker can achieve a speed of 15.5 knots (28.7 km/h; 17.8 mph) with four engines running and 12.5 knots (23.2 km/h; 14.4 mph) in economic cruising with two engines.

== See also ==
History of the petroleum industry in Canada (frontier exploration and development)
