= John P. Devaney (fireboat) =

The John P. Devaney was a fireboat operated briefly by the Fire Department of New York City in 1994. It was named after a firefighter who lost his life in the line of duty.

The John P. Devaney and her sister ship, the Alfred E. Ronaldson, were experimental surface-effect ship designs related to hovercraft. They had a pair of catamaran hulls. A rubber skirt between the hulls could be inflated by powerful fans, enabling them to travel at over 30 knots (56 km/h). The fibreclass hulls were shipped from Europe, equipped with a high-tech sensor suite.

At $3.5 million each, the vessels were expensive. After being commissioned in June 1992, but were operated for only five months, withdrawn in November 1992 because their maintenance was too complicated.

== See also ==
- Fireboats in New York City
