= Miscaroo =

History

Canada
- Name: Miscaroo (1983–1995); Canmar Miscaroo (1995–1998)
- Namesake: Loucheaux for "owl"
- Owner: BeauDril (Gulf Canada Resources) (1983–1993); Canadian Marine Drilling Ltd. (1993–1997)
- Port of registry: Vancouver, British Columbia
- Ordered: December 1979
- Builder: Vancouver Shipyards Co. Ltd., North Vancouver
- Yard number: 106
- Laid down: 5 July 1982
- Launched: 13 March 1983
- Completed: 29 July 1983
- In service: 1983–1998
- Fate: Sold to Russia

Russia
- Name: Iscaroo (1998); Smit Sakhalin (1998–2017)
- Owner: Smit International (later Smit Lamnalco)
- Port of registry: Kholmsk, Russia
- In service: 1998–2017
- Identification: Call sign: UFXQ; IMO number: 8127830; MMSI number: 273438220
- Fate: Sold for scrap

General characteristics
- Type: Icebreaker, AHTS
- Tonnage: 3,143 GT; 1,200 DWT (design draught)
- Displacement: 5,050 tons
- Length: 78.85 m (259 ft)
- Beam: 17.22 m (56 ft)
- Draught: 7.5 m (25 ft) (design)
- Depth: 9.7 m (32 ft)
- Ice class: CASPPR Arctic Class 4
- Installed power: 4 × Wärtsilä Vasa 8R32 (4 × 3,725 hp)
- Propulsion: Two shafts; controllable pitch propellers
- Speed: 15.5 knots (28.7 km/h; 17.8 mph) (4 engines); 12.5 knots (23.2 km/h; 14.4 mph) (2 engines); 3–4 knots (5.6–7.4 km/h; 3.5–4.6 mph) in 1.2 m (4 ft) ice
- Crew: 6 officers; 16 crew; 12 passengers

Miscaroo was an icebreaking anchor handling tug supply vessel built by Vancouver Shipyards for BeauDril, the drilling subsidiary of Gulf Canada Resources, in 1983. She was part of a fleet of Canadian icebreakers used to support offshore oil exploration in the Beaufort Sea. In the 1990s, the vessel was acquired by Canadian Marine Drilling (Canmar) and renamed Canmar Miscaroo. In 1998, she was purchased by Smit International and served in the Sakhalin oil fields as Smit Sakhalin until 2017 when the 34-year-old icebreaker was sold for scrapping in China.

== History ==
=== Development and construction ===
In the mid-1970s, oil companies began drilling in the Canadian part of the Beaufort Sea. In order to overcome the relatively short operating window of drillships during the ice-free season (100 to 110 days a year) and the water depth limitations of artificial dredged islands, Gulf Canada Resources began developing an Arctic drilling system consisting of two mobile drilling units: a Mobile Arctic Caisson (MAC) that could be submerged and filled with gravel to form an artificial drilling island in waters up to 40 metres (130 ft) in depth and a floating Conical Drilling Unit (CDU) designed for drilling in water depths between 40 and 60 metres (130 and 200 ft) while afloat. These units, each capable of completing one exploration well per year, would be supported by four Arctic Class 4 vessels: two large icebreakers providing 24-hour ice management and standby services on the drilling site and two smaller icebreaking vessels responsible for anchor handling and supply runs between the drilling rigs and coastal bases. By 1982, both drilling units and all four icebreaking vessels were under construction in Canada and Japan for BeauDril, Gulf Canada's drilling subsidiary, and the company had committed itself to a billion-dollar exploration program between 1983 and 1988.

The smaller icebreakers were designed by the Canadian naval architecture company Robert Allan Ltd and the construction of one vessel was awarded to Vancouver Shipyards in Vancouver, British Columbia, in December 1979. The keel of the vessel was laid on 5 July 1982 and she was launched on 13 March 1983 as Miscaroo. The name, Loucheaux for "owl", had been chosen in a naming contest by Northern Territories school children. She was completed on 29 July 1983 and immediately headed for the Beaufort Sea.

Miscaroo's sister ship, Ikaluk, was built at Nippon Kōkan K. K. Tsurumi Shipyard in Japan and delivered in April 1983. Despite having been built at two different shipyards on the opposite sides of the world, the two vessels were nearly identical with most of the major components being supplied by Gulf Canada to both shipyards. These vessels were the first Canadian Arctic vessels powered by diesel engines manufactured by Wärtsilä.

=== Miscaroo and Canmar Miscaroo (1983–1998) ===
Between 1983 and 1990, BeauDril's mobile drilling units drilled a total of nineteen exploratory wells in the Canadian part of the Beaufort Sea with the support of Miscaroo and other icebreaking vessels: nine with the Mobile Arctic Caisson Molikpaq and ten with the Conical Drilling Unit Kulluk. Twelve wells alone were drilled in the Amauligak prospect, the most significant oil and gas field discovered in the region, but the high expectations for the Beaufort Sea were not met: the area was characterized by a large number of small, widely scattered resources. Molikpaq was mothballed after completing the last well in 1990. However, Kulluk was used to drill a total of four wells in 1992 and 1993 for ARCO Alaska on the American part of the Beaufort Sea before being cold-stacked at Tuktoyaktuk.

In 1993, BeauDril's flotilla of drilling rigs, icebreakers and support vessels was purchased by Canadian Marine Drilling (Canmar). The drilling subsidiary of Dome Petroleum (later Amoco Canada) had been BeauDril's main competitor in the Beaufort Sea for more than a decade and the merger of two former rivals created the world's largest fleet of commercial Arctic vessels. Despite declining activity in the Canadian Arctic, Amoco saw Canmar and its expertise as a long-term asset and tried to find work for Miscaroo (Canmar Miscaroo since 1995), from other areas such as the North Sea.

=== Smit Sakhalin (1998–2017) ===
In the end, Amoco could not make profit from maintaining Canmar and sold the company's remaining assets, including Canmar Miscaroo, in 1997 to an international consortium of shipping companies. After having been reflagged to Bahamas and renamed Iscaroo for a brief period of time, the vessel was purchased by the Dutch company Smit International in 1998 and renamed Smit Sakhalin. The vessel left Rotterdam in April 1998 and arrived in Singapore where the management was taken over by Smit's local subsidiary. At the same time, the company also purchased Miscaroo's sister ship, Ikaluk, and renamed her Smit Sibu.

The two former Canadian offshore icebreakers were deployed together at the Vityaz Production Complex during the first phase of the Sakhalin-2 project in the seasonally frozen Sea of Okhotsk. In addition to providing year-round supply services for the Piltun-Astokhskoye-A platform (the former Molikpaq), they served as ice management and standby vessels for the floating storage and offloading (FSO) vessel Okha and its single anchor leg mooring (SALM) buoy. The icebreakers were used to assist the raising and lowering of the SALM buoy and the beginning and end of the production season, and to support loading operations together with other icebreaking vessels until the ice conditions became too severe. In 2006, the management of Smit Sakhalin was transferred to FEMCO Management and she was converted to dedicated stand-by vessel at Keppel Tuas shipyard in Singapore. She continued in this role after the ice management operations at Vityaz Production Complex ended when the production platform was connected to a subsea pipeline in 2008. Her management was returned to Smit in 2013.

The 34-year-old Smit Sakhalin was sold for recycling in 2017 and arrived at the scrapyard in Jiangyin, China, in September.

== Design ==
=== General characteristics ===
Miscaroo was 78.85 metres (259 ft) long overall and 75.50 metres (248 ft) at the waterline. She had a moulded beam of 17.22 metres (56 ft) at the widest point of the hull and 16.6 metres (54 ft) at the waterline. The vessel had a light displacement of 3,650 tons but when loaded to the design draught of 7.5 metres (25 ft), she displaced 5,050 tons of water. Her icebreaking hull form, developed at the Hamburgische Schiffbau-Versuchsanstalt (HSVA) ice tank in Hamburg, Germany, featured a heavy forefoot wedge to deflect ice floes and large bossings to protect propellers and rudders from damage, and was strengthened to Canadian Arctic Shipping Pollution Prevention Regulations (CASPPR) Arctic Class 4 requirements. The hull was made of cold-resistant high strength steel sourced from Japan and coated with the low-friction Inerta 160 epoxy paint.

Inside, Miscaroo provided comfortable accommodation for six officers and 16 crew members in single cabins even when the ambient temperature dropped to −50 °C (−58 °F). In addition, she had two six-person cabins for 12 passengers commuting between oil rigs and coastal bases. Designed to provide the drilling units with bulk cement, fuel oil and drinking water, Miscaroo had cargo tanks and an open 450-square-metre (4,800 sq ft) cargo deck abaft of the deckhouse. Her hydraulic quadruple-drum waterfall-type winch could be used to tow Kulluk, BeauDril's ice-strengthened drilling unit, as well as deploy and retrieve its anchors at the drilling site.

=== Power and propulsion ===
Miscaroo had a diesel-mechanical propulsion system with four medium-speed diesel engines driving two shafts through twin input-single output gearboxes. The main engines were eight-cylinder Wärtsilä Vasa 8R32 medium-speed diesel engines rated at 3,750 hp (2,800 kW) each. The flexible couplings in the Lohmann & Stolterfoht Model GVA 1400 SO single-stage reduction gearboxes allowed choosing between fuel-saving cruise in open water using two engines or full icebreaking power with all four engines running. The four-bladed stainless steel controllable pitch propellers, manufactured by LIPS Canada, had a diameter of 3.75 metres (12 ft) and were placed in fixed nozzles. For maneuvering, the vessel had twin rudders, a 1,200 hp (890 kW) OmniThruster water jet thruster in the bow and an 800 hp (600 kW) KaMeWa tunnel thruster in the stern. Onboard electricity was produced by two 530 hp (395 kW) Caterpillar auxiliary diesel generators or a smaller 130 hp (100 kW) Caterpillar 3404 diesel generator which was intended to be used when the vessel is at dock. In addition, the gearboxes incorporated 1,200 kVA shaft alternators.

At full power, Miscaroo was designed to break 1.2-metre (3.9 ft) level ice with a speed of 3–4 knots (5.6–7.4 km/h; 3.5–4.6 mph). The icebreaking was further assisted by an active hull lubrication system incorporated to the OmniThruster unit: nozzles along the forward half-length of the vessel could be used to eject air/water mixture between the hull and the ice to prevent the vessel from becoming stuck in ice. In open water, Miscaroo could achieve a speed of 15.5 knots (28.7 km/h; 17.8 mph) with four engines running and 12.5 knots (23.2 km/h; 14.4 mph) in economic cruising with two engines.

== See also ==
History of the petroleum industry in Canada (frontier exploration and development)
