= Alfred E. Ronaldson (fireboat) =

Retired New York City fireboat (1990s)

The Alfred E. Ronaldson was a fireboat operated briefly by the Fire Department of New York City in 1994. The boat was named after a firefighter who lost his life in the line of duty.

The Alfred E. Ronaldson, and her sister ship, the John P. Devaney, were experimental "surface effect ship" designs, a design related to hovercraft. The vessels had a pair of catamaran hulls. A rubber skirt between the two hulls could be inflated by powerful fans, and this enabled her to travel at over 30 knots (56 km/h). The vessels' fiberclass hulls were shipped from Europe. They came equipped with a high-tech sensor suite.

The vessels were expensive, costing $3.5 million each. But after they were commissioned in June 1992 they only had an operational service span of five months, being withdrawn in November 1992 as their maintenance was too complicated.

== Namesake ==
Alfred E. Ronaldson had been a firefighter with the FDNY for 13 years, and had received 6 citations. He grew up and lived in Montgomery, New York, a municipality near New York City, and was a volunteer firefighter in its fire department. He died fighting a fire in The Bronx, New York. His crew, Rescue Company 3, responded to a fire at 126 East Fordham Road, where Firefighter Ronaldson was killed after a slab of concrete placed over a stairway collapsed.

== See also ==
- Fireboats in New York City
