= MV Hayat N =

History
- Name: MV Hayat N
- Owner: Istanbul Lines
- Operator: Marmara N Denizcilik
- Builder: Factorias Vulcano in Vigo, Spain
- Launched: 22 December 1980
- Completed: 1982
- Identification: IMO number: 7826685
- Fate: Sank in the Sea of Marmara on January 11, 2008.

General characteristics
- Class & type: roro ferry
- Tonnage: 8,547 GT
- Length: 122.80 m (402 ft 11 in)
- Beam: 18.37 m (60 ft 3 in)
- Draught: 6.38 m (20 ft 11 in)
- Depth: 13.2 m (43 ft 4 in)
- Installed power: 7,360 kW
- Propulsion: 2 screw propeller controllable pitch
- Speed: 17.5 knots (32.4 km/h; 20.1 mph)
- Capacity: 963 t
- Crew: 28

MV Hayat N was a Turkish roro ferry that sank on September 15, 2008 23:30 local time (21:30 GMT) in the Sea of Marmara off Bandırma in Balıkesir Province, Turkey. Owned by Istanbul Lines, she was operated by Marmara N Denizcilik between the Marmara Sea ports Bandırma, Ambarlı and Haydarpaşa.

The vessel sank around 15 minutes after leaving Bandırma en route to Ambarlı, Istanbul Province. It was carrying 68 passengers and 28 crew with 73 trucks and two cars. One person was killed and five were missing. 89 of the survivors swam to shore or were rescued by fishing boats. 25 were admitted to hospitals. The cause of the sinking is thought to be that the ship was overloaded.

== Aftermath ==
Rescue operations, started immediately to search for the missing persons, were terminated on September 19 without any success.

Divers found the wreckage 450 m (1,480 ft) off the port's north breakwater at a depth of 24 m (79 ft). Most of the 73 trucks were scattered 200 m (660 ft) around the shipwreck.

As reported on October 1, the corpse of one of the missing passengers landed ashore around 500 m (1,600 ft) from the place, where the vessel sunk. The body of another missing person was brought to surface by divers on October 5.

== Ships registry ==
- June 11, 2007 Ciudad de Burgos
- November 29, 1989 MOS Freeway
- August 13, 1989 BOS Freeway
- March 8, 1989 LUX Freeway
- June 30, 1988 Burgos
- August 19, 1985 Roll Vigo
