= Fire Fighter II =

FDNY Fireboat

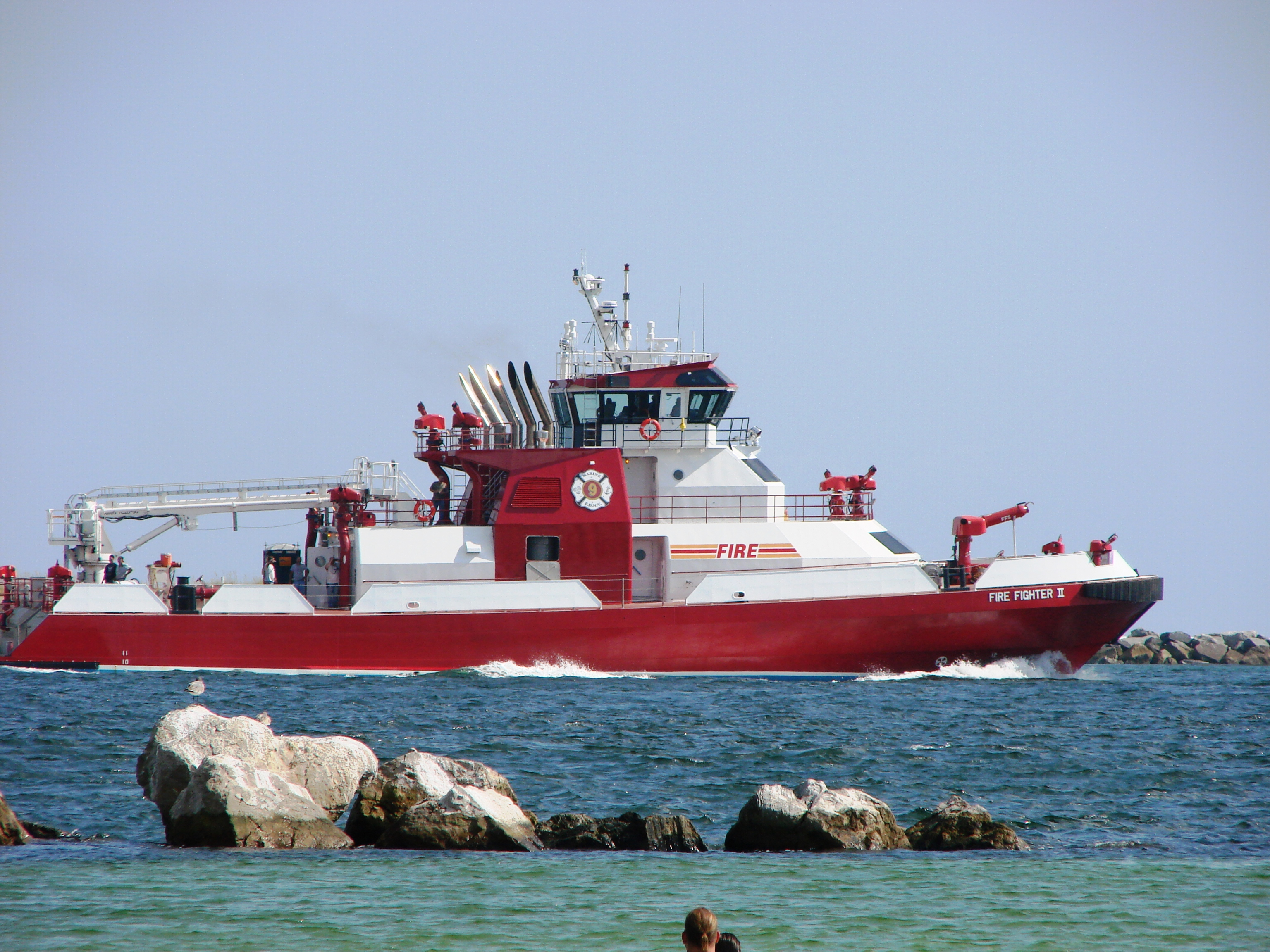
- Fire Fighter II

History

New York City Fire Department
- Name: Fire Fighter II
- Operator: New York City Fire Department
- Laid down: 2008
- Commissioned: December 7, 2010
- Home port: Homeport Pier, Staten Island
- Identification: MMSI number: 367597240
- Nickname(s): Tommy Phelan
- Status: In service
- Notes: Predecessor: Fire Fighter

General characteristics
- Length: 140 ft (43 m)
- Beam: 36 ft (11 m)
- Draft: 9 ft (2.7 m)
- Installed power: MTU 4 × 2000 HP engines
- Propulsion: Hundested 4 × Variable Pitch Propellers
- Speed: 17 knots (20 mph)
- Boats & landing craft carried: Tender
- Capacity: 20,000 gpm/50,000 gpm max
- Crew: 7

Fire Fighter II is a Robert Allan Ltd. Ranger 4200 class fireboat put in service with Marine Company 9 of the New York City Fire Department (FDNY) on December 7, 2010. The boat replaces the original Fire Fighter, and is sister to the fireboat Three Forty Three which serves with Marine Company 1.

In 2012, FDNY opened new quarters for Marine 9 at the Staten Island Homeport, a 1,410-foot-long pier in Stapleton that was built in 1980s to berth the Battleship Iowa as part of the former Naval Station New York.

== Features ==
Construction of Fire Fighter II began in December 2008. The 140-foot, 500-ton, $27 million fast response boat is the country's largest fireboat, with a maximum speed of 18 knots (33 km/h; 21 mph). It incorporates the latest technology available for marine vessels, with the fire fighting capability delivered by Norwegian manufacturer Fire Fighting Systems (FFS), capabilities that include pumping up to 50,000 gallons of water per minute, nearly 30,000 gallons more than its predecessor. There is an operating crew of seven.

== See also ==
- Fireboats of New York City
