= James J. Versluis =

Chicago tugboat

The James J. Versluis is a tugboat operated by the Chicago Water Department. She is 90 feet (27 m) long, and built in 1957.

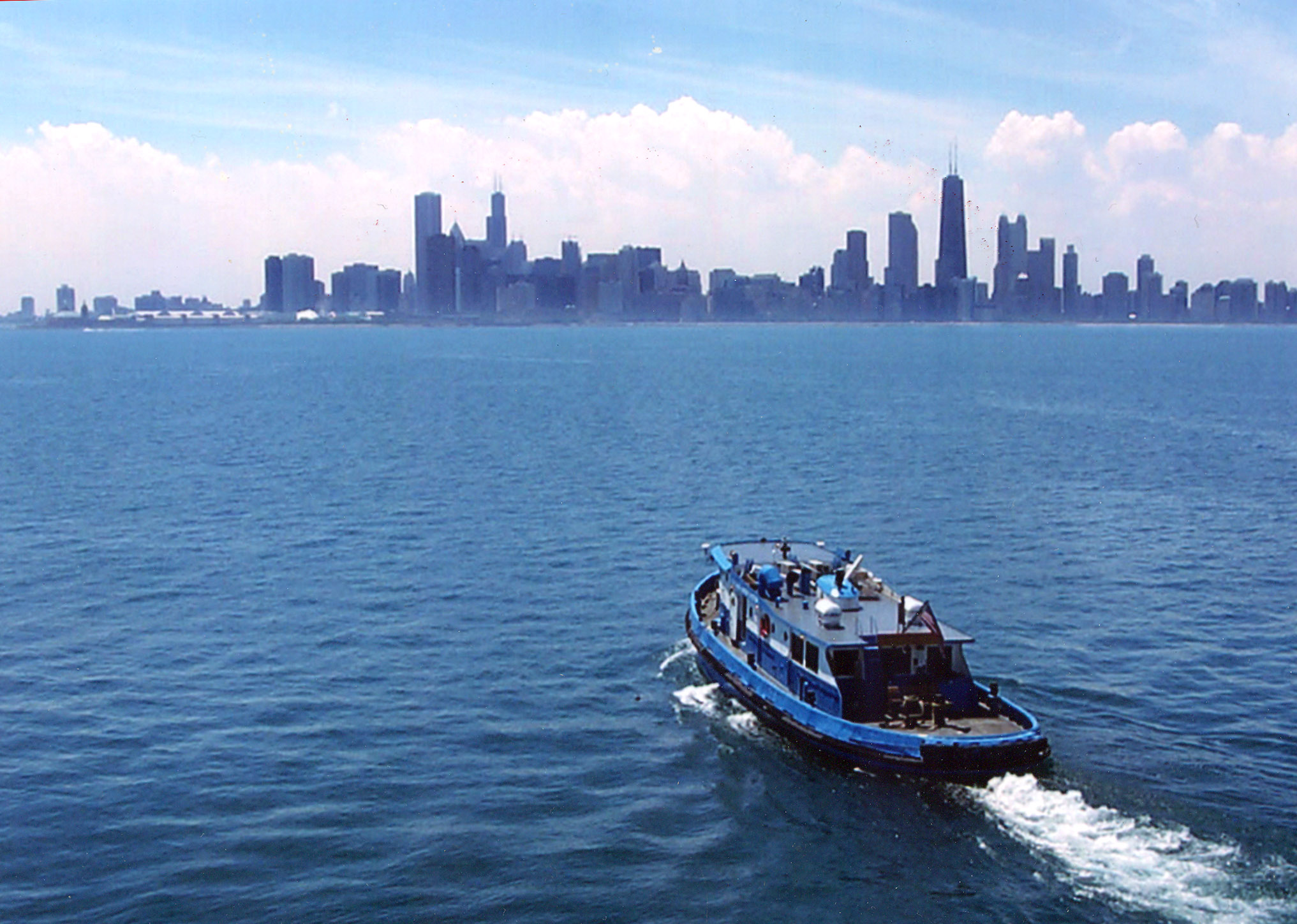
James J. Versluis with the Chicago Skyline on the horizon.

She was named after a former director of the Water Department. Although she was built to service the Water Department's facilities she mounted a water cannon capable of pumping a modest 800 gallons of water a minute.

One of her primary tasks is helping service five water intake structures, called "cribs", several miles off-shore. The cribs are equipped with barracks, for maintenance workers, and were once staffed 24 hours a day, 365 days a year. The James J. Versluis was the worker's main link to the shore, and would have to make its way to the cribs even when the lake was frozen over.

While both the tug and the Fire Department's much newer fireboat Christopher Wheatley were designed to be capable of breaking the ice on Chicago's rivers, this task falls mainly to the James J. Versluis. Keeping the river's navigable is important for fire services, so fireboats can arrive quickly at waterfront fires. In addition other city departments have maintenance vessels that travel the rivers to maintain bridges and other infrastructure—even in winter.
