= George B. McClellan (fireboat) =

Fireboat

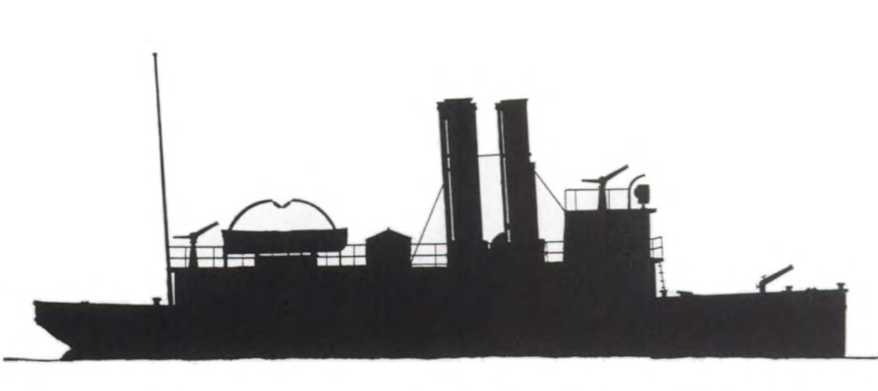

History

New York City Fire Department
- Name: George B. McClellan
- Namesake: George B. McClellan Jr.
- Operator: New York City Fire Department
- Builder: New York Shipbuilding, Camden, New Jersey
- Laid down: 1904
- Out of service: 1938
- Renamed: Engine 78; Marine 5
- Status: In reserve
- Notes: Predecessor:

General characteristics
- Capacity: 7,000 gpm

The George B. McClellan was a fireboat operated by the FDNY from 1904 to 1954. She was designed by Harry deBerkley Parsons, as were other FDNY fireboats built at the time.

The capacity of the George B. McClellan's pumps was 7,000 US gallons (26,000 L) per minute.

The George B. McClellan was wrecked by an explosion, in 1954. Another fireboat, the John D. McKean, was named after an engineer who died when he stayed at his post on the George B. McClellan when she exploded.

The George B. McClellan was named after the then-incumbent Mayor of New York City, the son of the Civil War General.
