= John D. McKean (fireboat) =

Retired New York City fireboat

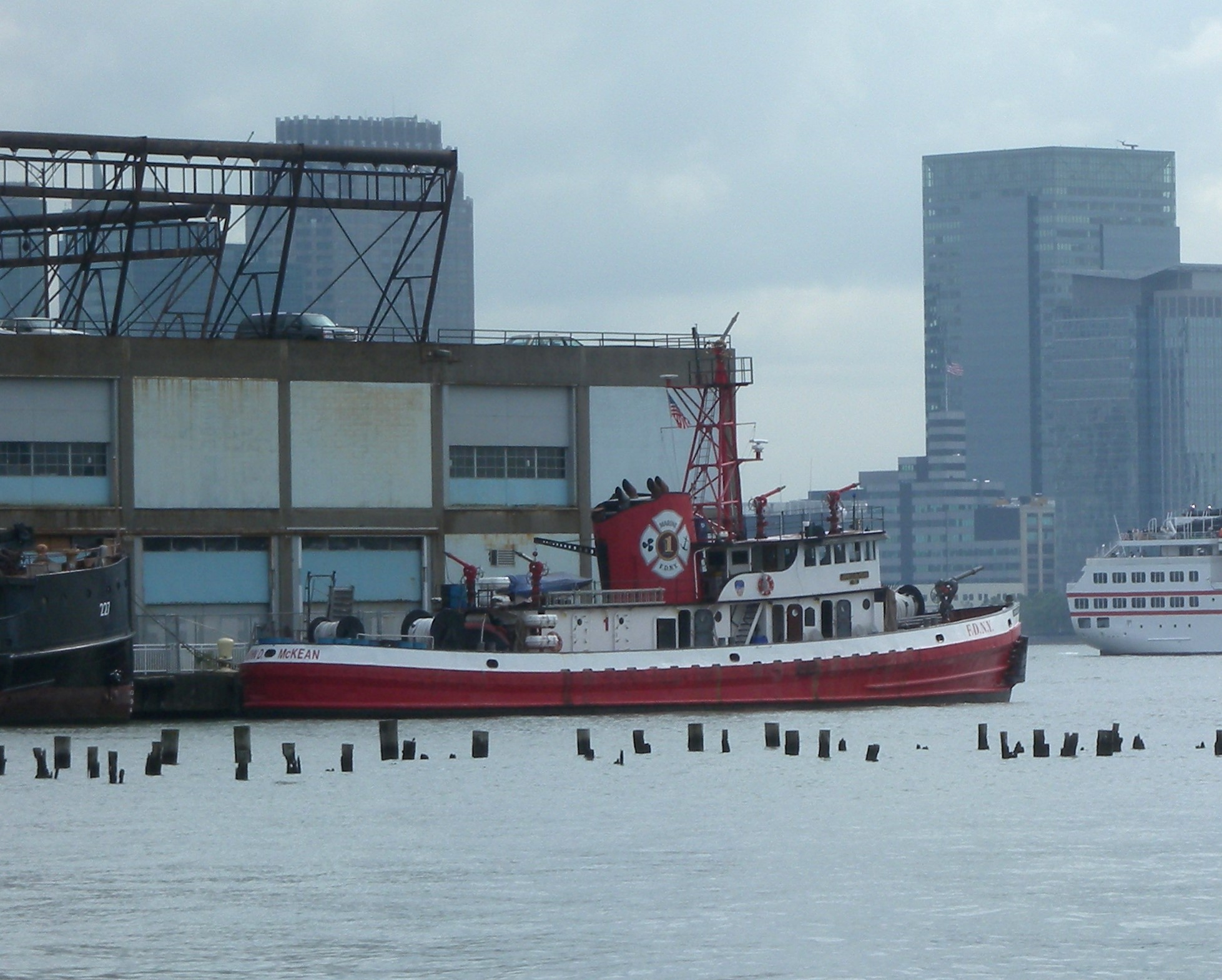

History

New York City Fire Department
- Name: Marine 1 John D. McKean
- Operator: New York City Fire Department
- Builder: John H. Mathis
- Laid down: 1954
- Out of service: 2010
- Home port: Foot Of Bloomfield St., Manhattan
- Status: Undergoing restoration
- Notes: Predecessor: George B. McClellan Successor: Three Forty Three

General characteristics
- Tonnage: 334.75 gross tons
- Length: 129 ft (39 m)
- Beam: 31 ft (9.4 m)
- Height: 47.5 ft (14.5 m)
- Draft: 9.5 ft (2.9 m)
- Propulsion: Twin 1,000 HP Enterprise direct reversible diesel engines
- Speed: 16 mph
- Capacity: 19,000 gpm
- Crew: 7
- Time to activate: 1.5 minutes
- John D. Mckean (fireboat)
- U.S. National Register of Historic Places
- Location within New York Location within the United States
- Location: Panco Petroleum Dock, 23 Grassy Point Rd., Stony Point, New York
- Coordinates: 41°13′32″N 73°57′54″W
- Area: 0.07 acres (0.028 ha)
- NRHP reference No.: 100009157
- Added to NRHP: July 28, 2023

John D. McKean is a fireboat that served the New York City Fire Department as Marine Company 1. She is named after John D. Mckean, who died in a 1953 steam explosion while trying to save a predecessor fireboat, the George B. McClellan.

== Operational history ==
John D. McKean responded to various disasters in New York City's history, such as the burning of the Staten Island Ferry Whitehall Terminal in 1991. She was one of the fire boats, along with Fire Fighter and the retired John J. Harvey, that responded to Manhattan during the September 11, 2001, attacks to supply firefighters with water after water mains broke following the collapse of the World Trade Center. The boat also evacuated dozens of people from the World Trade Center site following the attacks. She helped rescue passengers from US Airways Flight 1549, when she made an emergency landing on the Hudson River in 2009.

In 2010, John D. McKean was retired and put in reserve status, after being replaced by a new vessel, the Three Forty Three, named for the FDNY members who lost their lives in the line of duty on September 11, 2001.

== Museum vessel ==
On March 2, 2016, FDNY sold the John D. McKean at auction for $57,400. The vessel was purchased by Edward Taylor and Michael Kaphan, partners in several restaurants. The fireboat was turned over to the Fireboat Preservation Project which is a non for profit 501(c). The preservation project planned to turn the boat into a floating museum.

In mid-2019 the vessel underwent repairs to her hull that required her to be hauled out of the water. She was temporarily docked at Pier 25 in Tribeca, Manhattan, for restoration in 2021. That September, John D. McKean was temporarily opened for tours to commemorate the 20th anniversary of the September 11 attacks. By 2022, the plans were for John D. McKean to be moored at Pier 25 and open that year. The museum had not yet opened by the following year, when the vessel was stored in Stony Point, New York. John D. McKean was added to the National Register of Historic Places in July 2023.

== Namesake ==
The vessel was named after a FDNY Marine Engineer who was assigned for one day, September 17, 1953, aboard the FDNY Fireboat George B. McClellan for a special water display in NY harbor for a group of state senators and assemblymen from Albany, NY. McKean was normally assigned to the Fireboat James Duane. During the display operation a condenser in the engine room exploded scalding McKean. Despite what took place, McKean stayed at his post. McKean was brought to a hospital in Staten Island for treatment. McKean died five days later on September 22, 1953.

== See also ==
- Fireboats of New York City
- National Register of Historic Places listings in Rockland County, New York
