= Illinois (fireboat) =

Chicago Fire Department steel boat (1888–1908)

The Illinois was a fireboat operated by the Chicago Fire Department. She was commissioned in 1888, and she was then described as the most powerful fireboat afloat. She was one of the first fireboats to have a steel hull at a time when other fireboats were built of wood.

The Illinois was struck by falling debris while fighting a massive fire in 1908, and sunk in 20 feet of water in the Chicago River. She was however quickly refloated, and put back into service.

specifications
length	118 feet (36 m)
draft	12.5 feet (3.8 m)
cost	$100,000 USD
fire-fighting equipment	11 water cannons
propulsion	Steam engines powered dynamos that in turn powered electric motors.
