= Governor Alfred E. Smith (fireboat) =

Fireboat in New York City

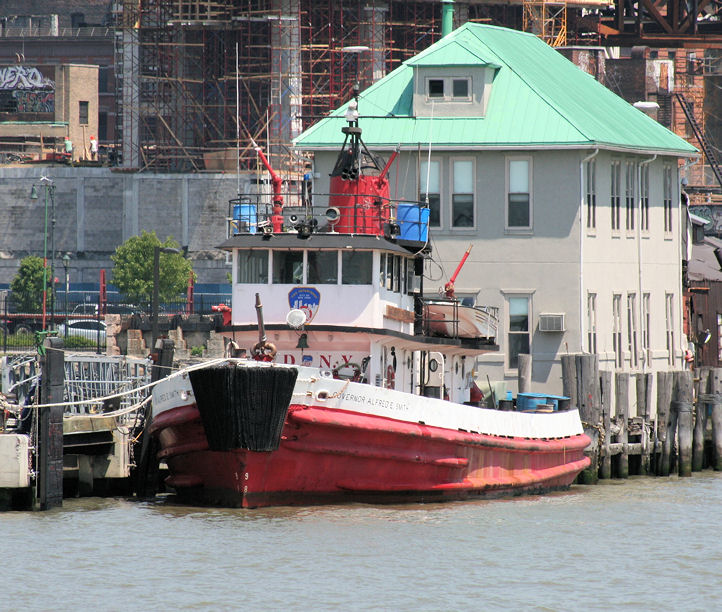

Governor Alfred E. Smith was a fireboat first operated by the Fire Department of New York in 1961. She was the last of four sister ships. In 1970 the Department planned to retire her, but, instead, she was placed in reserve. She was finally retired on October 21, 2016. Governor Alfred E Smith was built by John H. Mathis & Company at Camden, New Jersey, yard number 216 in August 1961.

== Operational career ==
The Governor Alfred E. Smith was launched on May 26, 1961 at Manthis Shipyard, in Camden New Jersey, at a cost of $907,077.

In 1967 the crew of Governor Alfred E. Smith distinguished themselves when two tankers collided. 33 men died when Alva Cape and Texaco Massachusetts collided. Four more men died, two days later, when salvage workers tried to make the wrecks safe, by emptying their tanks, and Alva Cape exploded. Governor Alfred E. Smith's captain was blown overboard. They were credited with saving 70 lives.

According to Mayor John Lindsay "The fireboat literally sailed into the hold of one of the ships, where a lava-like flow of naphtha was pouring out, and smothered it with foam."

== Floating restaurant ==
In 2016 she was sold to developers, who plan to turn her into a floating restaurant known as "Marine Company 7", in Brooklyn.

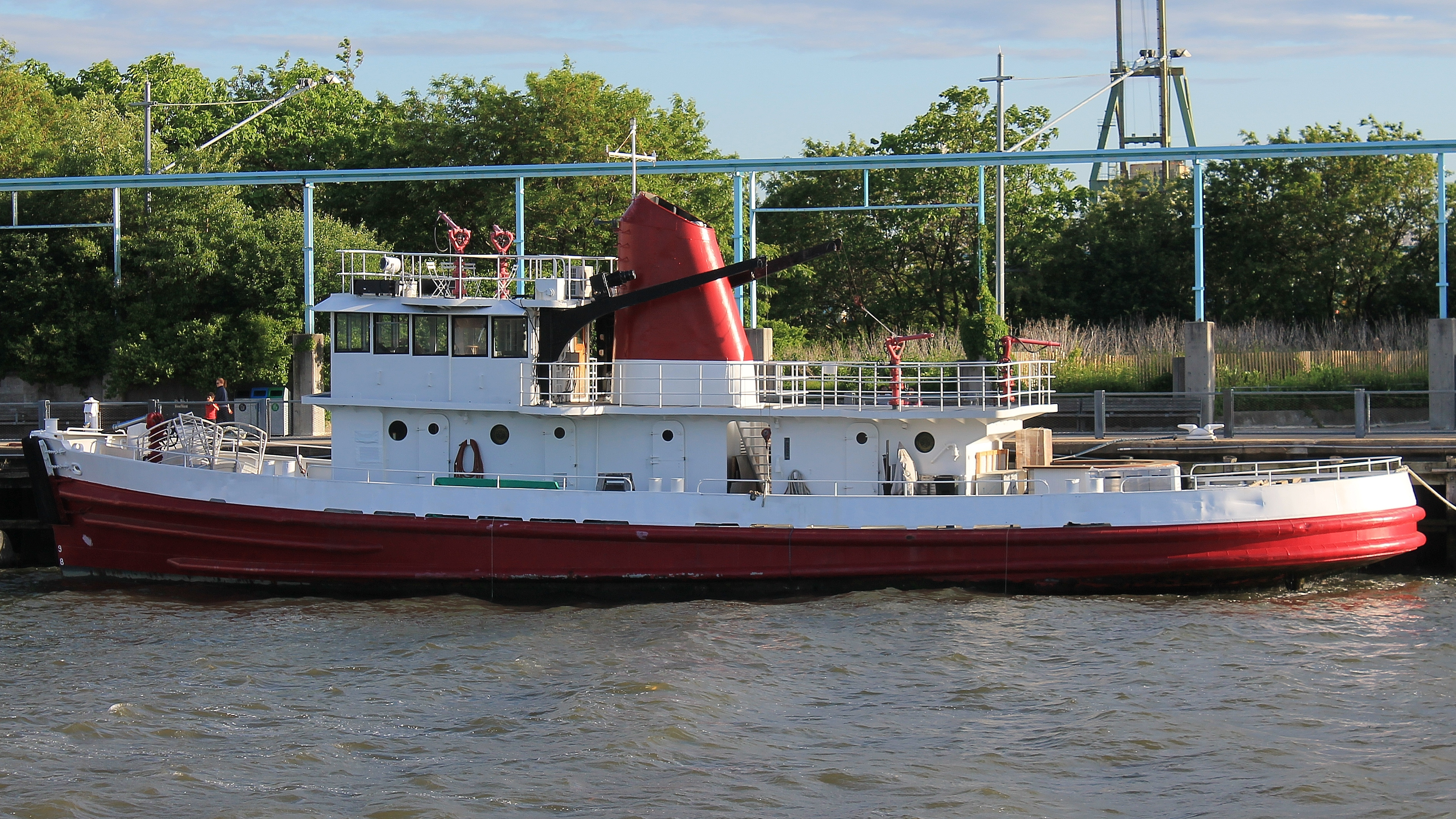
