= Three Forty Three =

FDNY Fireboat

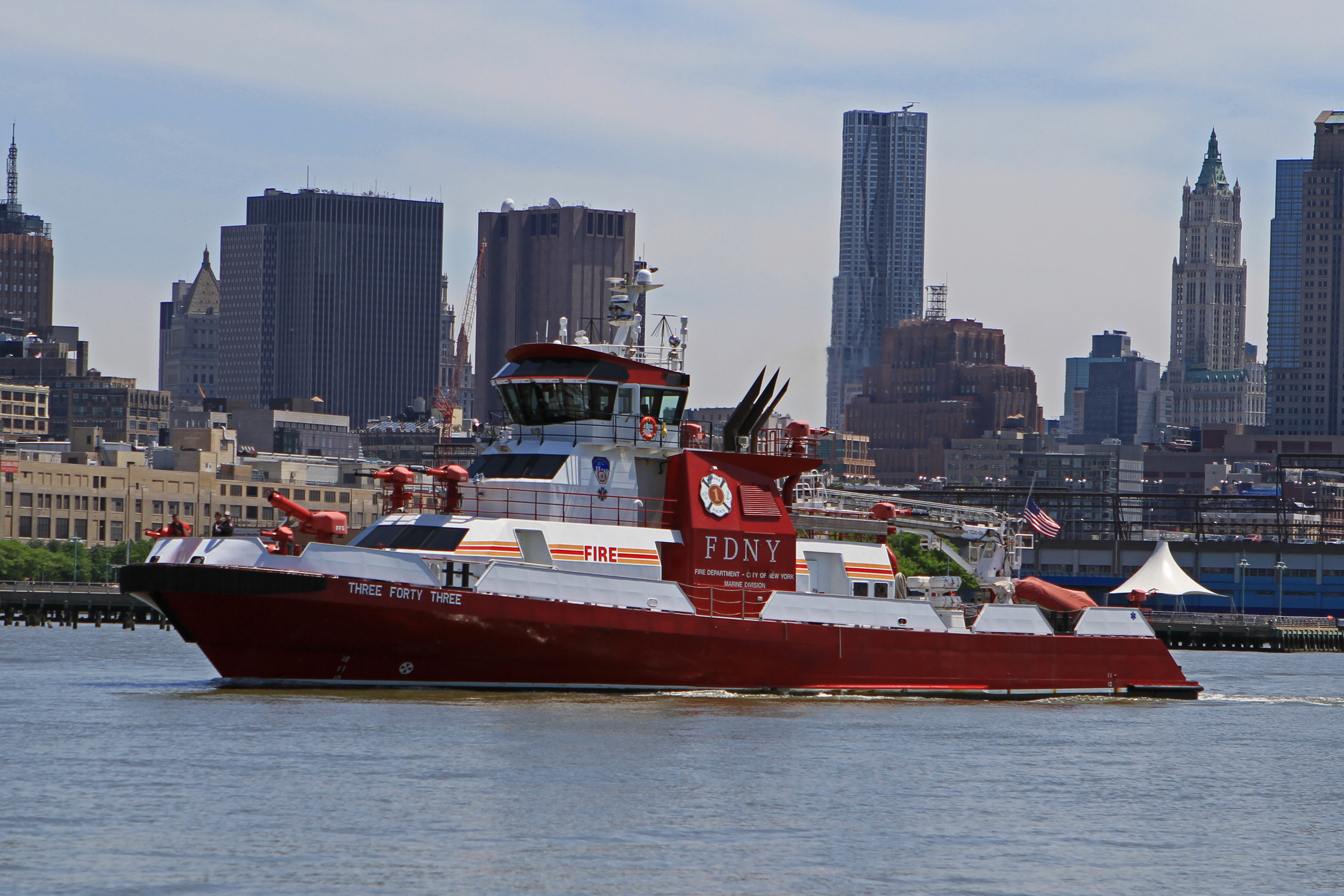
- Three Forty Three

History

New York City Fire Department
- Name: Three Forty Three
- Operator: New York City Fire Department
- Awarded: December 28, 2007
- Builder: Eastern Shipbuilding Group
- Yard number: 968
- Laid down: May 2008
- Launched: September 11, 2009
- Sponsored by: United States Department of Homeland Security
- Christened: September 11, 2009
- Completed: April, 2010
- Acquired: June 23, 2010
- Commissioned: May 26, 2010
- In service: September 12, 2010
- Home port: Pier 53, Hudson River
- Identification: MMSI number: 367597230; Callsign: WDH2404
- Status: In service
- Notes: Predecessor: John D. McKean

General characteristics
- Class & type: Ranger 4200-class fireboat
- Tonnage: 500 GT
- Length: 140 ft (43 m)
- Beam: 36 ft (11 m)
- Draft: 9 ft (2.7 m)
- Installed power: 4 × MTU 2,000 hp (1,500 kW) engines
- Propulsion: Hundested 4 × variable pitch propellers
- Speed: 18 knots (33 km/h; 21 mph)
- Capacity: 20,000 gpm/50,000 gpm max
- Crew: 7

Three Forty Three is a Ranger 4200-class fireboat that serves the New York City Fire Department as Marine Company 1. Designed by Robert Allan Ltd. and built to replace the 1954 John D. McKean. It was commissioned at 0900 hours on September 11, 2010, exactly nine years after the 2001 terrorist attacks. It is one of the four New York fireboats currently active in service.

== Namesake ==
The boat's name comes from the number of FDNY members killed in the line of duty on September 11, 2001. For days following the terrorist attack, the only water available to the area was provided by the FDNY's Marine Units.

== Manufacturing ==
The Three Forty Three was built by Eastern Shipbuilding of Panama City, Florida, and is the largest single purpose fireboat built to date with the highest pumping capacity of any fireboat ever built. A sister vessel named Fire Fighter II was delivered and placed in service with Marine 9 in November 2010 to replace the 70-year-old Fire Fighter, which is listed on the National Register of Historic Places, and represented the city's first major investment in new fireboats in 50 years.

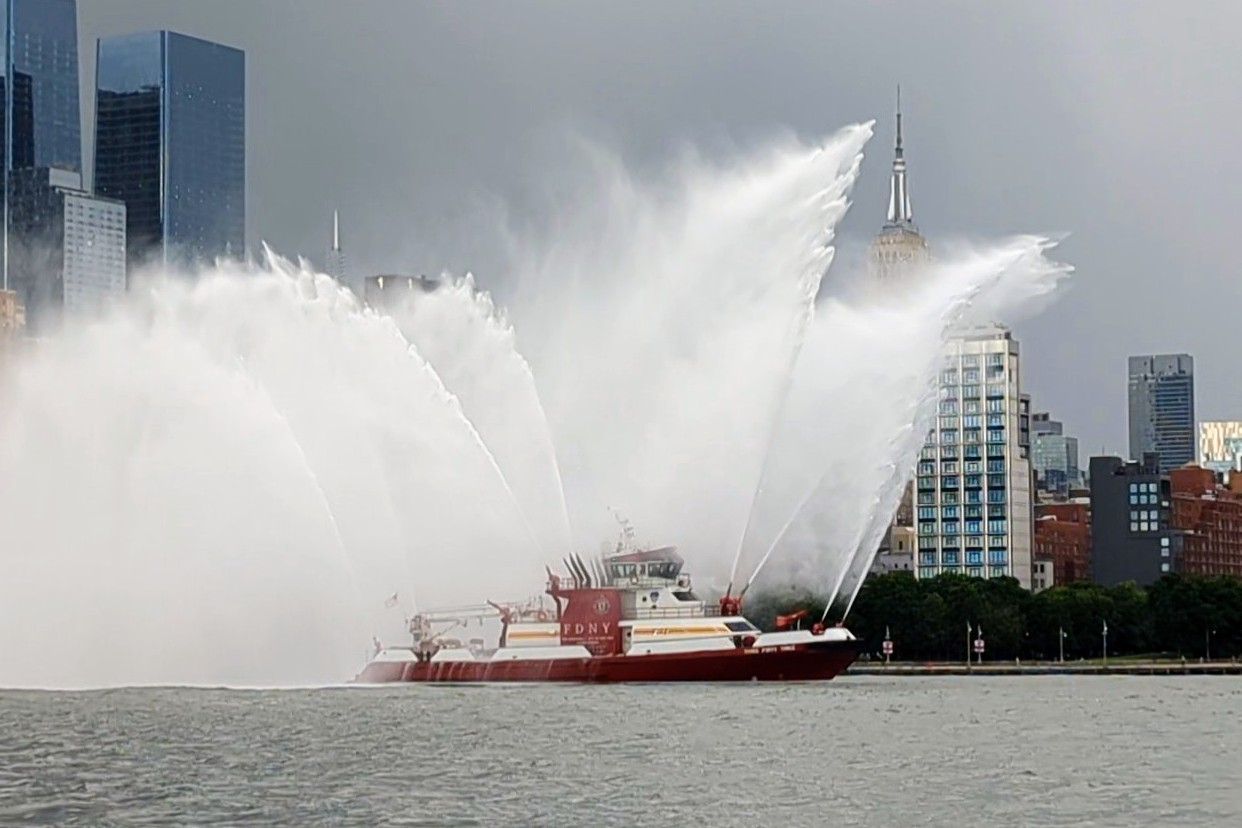
The fireboat performing a water cannon display in 2023

== Features ==
The 140-foot (43 m), 500-ton, $27 million fast response boat is the country's largest fireboat, with a maximum speed of 18 knots (33 km/h; 21 mph). The Three Forty Three incorporates the latest technology available with the vessel equipped with a fire-fighting system supplied by Norwegian manufacturer Fire Fighting Systems (FFS), supporting its high pumping capacity and long-range water delivery capability, including the capability of pumping 50,000 US gallons (190,000 L; 42,000 imp gal) of water per minute, nearly 30,000 US gal (110,000 L; 25,000 imp gal) more than its predecessor. It has an operating crew of seven.
