= Smoke II (fireboat) =

Retired New York City fireboat (1958–2008)

History

New York City Fire Department
- Name: Smoke II
- Owner: New York City
- Operator: New York City Fire Department
- Builder: Equitable Equipment
- In service: 1958
- Out of service: 2008
- Fate: artificial reef

General characteristics
- Class & type: fireboat
- Notes: pumping capacity of 2,000 gallons per minute

The Fire Department of New York operated the fireboat Smoke II from 1958 to 2008.

She was built in Louisiana, by Equitable Equipment.

She was smaller than the dozen or so fireboats in the FDNY's fleet, and was originally built to serve as a command vessel for senior firefighters—called a "tender" by the FDNY. In later years she was employed as a fireboat, but her modest pumping capacity of just 2,000 gallons per minute limited her usefulness.

With other New York City fireboats, her pumps provided water pressure for fire-fighting after the terrorist attack on September 11, 2001, which broke all the nearby watermains.

In 2008 she was retired and became an artificial reef.
