= Kevin C. Kane =

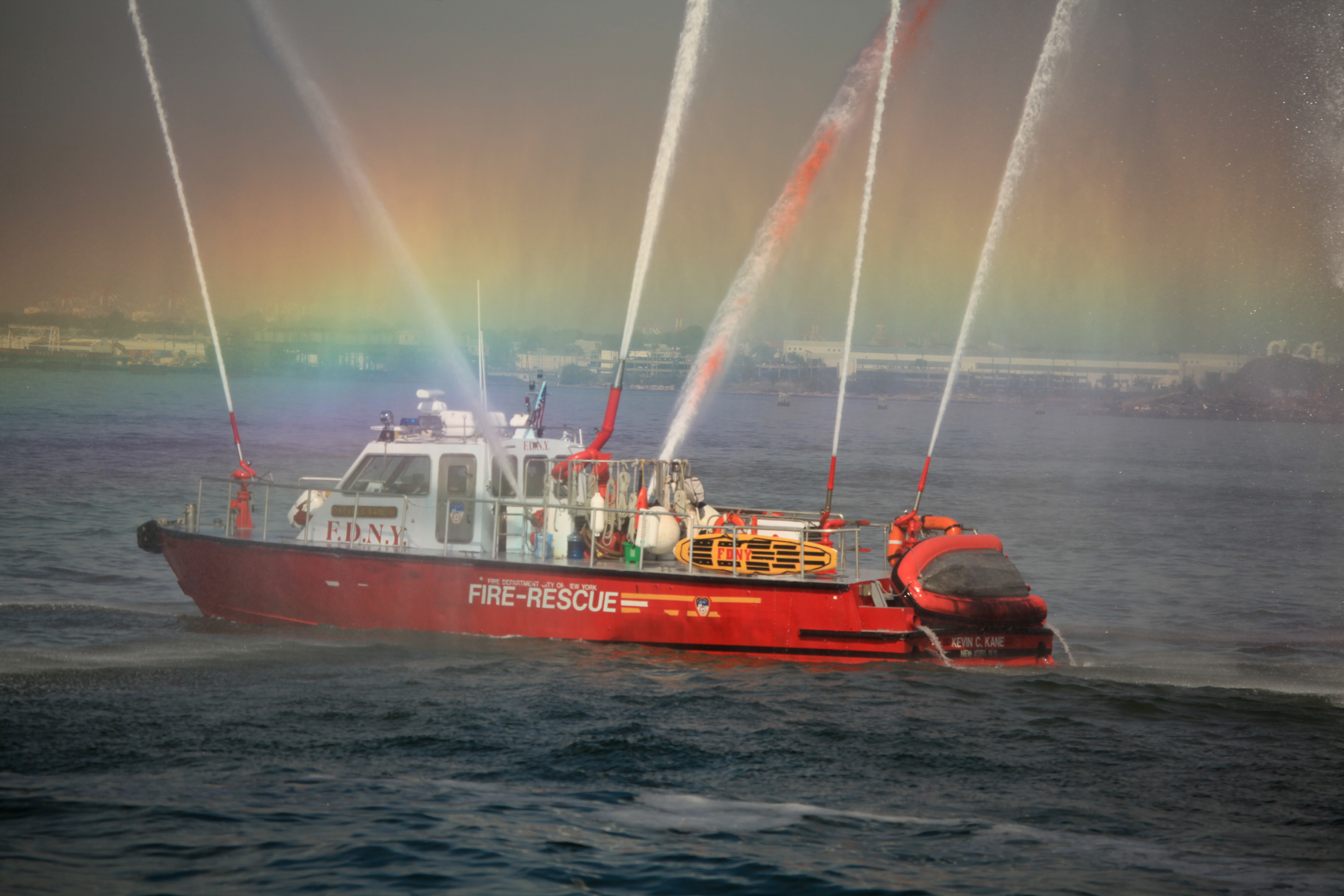
- The Kevin C. Kane helps celebrate Fleet Week in 2010.

History

New York City Fire Department
- Namesake: Kevin C. Kane
- Owner: New York City
- Operator: New York City Fire Department
- Builder: Gladding-Hearn Shipbuilding
- Fate: Sold & later converted to a tugboat

General characteristics
- Class & type: fireboat

The Kevin C. Kane was formerly an FDNY fireboat and is currently being refitted as a long-haul tugboat. She was built by Gladding-Hearn Shipbuilding in Somerset, Massachusetts, and delivered on December 8, 1992. She participated in two high-profile events: responding to al Qaeda's attack on the World Trade Center, on September 11, 2001; and the rescue of passengers from US Airways Flight 1549, the airliner that landed on the Hudson River in January 2009. She was auctioned off after she incurred damage during Hurricane Sandy. The vessel was named after a firefighter who lost his life in the line of duty.

According to Barbara La Rocca, author of Going Coast New York City, the Kevin C. Kane was the busiest fireboat in the World.

In 2017 her second owner sold her, after not making a real effort to repurpose her, to Mike Cole, owner of Iron Works Construction in Baileys Harbor, Wisconsin. Cole is adapting the vessel to serve as a tugboat. According to Cole, removing her fire pumps and water cannon reduced her draft by more than a foot, but, during the refit, he plans to add two further decks to her superstructure, to provide accommodation for her crew on long voyages.

In 2018 her third owner relaunched her on June 27, 2018.
