= SS John Bascom =

Liberty ship of WWII

History

United States
- Name: John Bascom
- Namesake: John Bascom
- Owner: War Shipping Administration (WSA)
- Operator: Moore-McCormack Lines, Inc.
- Ordered: as type (EC2-S-C1) hull, MC hull 1521
- Builder: J.A. Jones Construction, Panama City, Florida
- Cost: $2,062,150
- Yard number: 3
- Way number: 3
- Laid down: 7 September 1942
- Launched: 31 March 1943
- Sponsored by: Mrs. Harry G. Fannin
- Completed: 30 April 1943
- Identification: Call Signal: KLEG
- Fate: Sunk off Bari, Italy, 2 December 1943; Sold for scrapping, 20 February 1948

General characteristics
- Class & type: Liberty ship; type EC2-S-C1, standard
- Tonnage: 10,865 LT DWT; 7,176 GRT
- Displacement: 3,380 long tons (3,434 t) (light); 14,245 long tons (14,474 t) (max)
- Length: 441 feet 6 inches (135 m) oa; 416 feet (127 m) pp; 427 feet (130 m) lwl
- Beam: 57 feet (17 m)
- Draft: 27 ft 9.25 in (8.4646 m)
- Installed power: 2 × Oil fired 450 °F (232 °C) boilers, operating at 220 psi (1,500 kPa); 2,500 hp (1,900 kW)
- Propulsion: 1 × triple-expansion steam engine, (manufactured by Alabama Marine Engine Co., Birmingham, Alabama); 1 × screw propeller
- Speed: 11.5 knots (21.3 km/h; 13.2 mph)
- Capacity: 562,608 cubic feet (15,931 m^{3}) (grain); 499,573 cubic feet (14,146 m^{3}) (bale)
- Complement: 38–62 USMM; 21–40 USNAG
- Armament: Varied by ship; Bow-mounted 3-inch (76 mm)/50-caliber gun; Stern-mounted 4-inch (102 mm)/50-caliber gun; 2–8 × single 20-millimeter (0.79 in) Oerlikon anti-aircraft (AA) cannons and/or, 2–8 × 37-millimeter (1.46 in) M1 AA guns

SS John Bascom was a Liberty ship built in the United States during World War II. She was named after John Bascom, a professor of rhetoric at Williams College from 1855 to 1874, and the president of the University of Wisconsin from 1874 to 1887.

== Construction ==
John Bascom was laid down on 7 September 1942, under a Maritime Commission (MARCOM) contract, MC hull 1521, by J.A. Jones Construction, Panama City, Florida; she was sponsored by Mrs. Harry G. Fannin, the wife of the mayor of Panama City, she was launched on 31 March 1943.

== History ==
She was allocated to Moore-McCormack Lines, Inc., on 30 April 1943. On 2 December 1943, she was sunk during the German air raid on Bari, Italy. On 20 February 1948, she was sold, along with 39 other vessels, including her sister ships SS Isaac Shelby and SS Niels Poulson, for $520,000, to Venturi Salvaggi Ricuperi Imprese Marittime Societa per Azioni, Genoa.

== Awards ==
- Captain Otto Heitmann, Master of John Bascom was given the Merchant Marine Distinguished Service Medal by The President of the United States. With disregard to his painful injuries he aided and comforted his crew.
- Allen G. Collins, Third Mate on John Bascom was given the Merchant Marine Distinguished Service Medal by The President of the United States. Collins showed great courage and his self-sacrificing to aid his shipmates. John Bascom was attacked in the harbor of Bari, Italy. Around exploding and sinking ship that caused fire on John Bascom's deck with strafing enemy planes, Collins continued his gun crew until seriously wounded by a bomb. Wounded, he assisted other men to lifeboats, helped lower the boat, manned an oar for the trip to the breakwater and assisted in dragging three additional injured men from the flaming oil covered waters of the harbor. Several days later he died in a local hospital as a result of the injuries he had incurred.

== Bibliography ==
- "Jones Construction, Panama City FL". www.ShipbuildingHistory.com. 13 October 2010.
- Maritime Administration. "John Bascom". Ship History Database Vessel Status Card. U.S. Department of Transportation, Maritime Administration.
- Davies, James (May 2004). "Specifications (As-Built)" (PDF). p. 23.
- "SS John Bascom".
