= SS Cassius Hudson =

World War II Liberty ship of the United States

History

United States
- Name: Cassius Hudson
- Namesake: Cassius Hudson
- Ordered: as type (EC2-S-C1) hull, MC hull 2373
- Builder: J.A. Jones Construction, Brunswick, Georgia
- Cost: $1,032,241
- Yard number: 158
- Way number: 6
- Laid down: 22 July 1944
- Launched: 31 August 1944
- Sponsored by: Miss Frances Hudson
- Completed: 14 September 1944
- Identification: Call Signal: KSMS
- Fate: Struck a mine off Gibraltar, 16 October 1946; Sold for scrapping, 20 February 1948

General characteristics
- Class & type: Liberty ship; type EC2-S-C1, standard
- Tonnage: 10,865 LT DWT; 7,176 GRT
- Displacement: 3,380 long tons (3,434 t) (light); 14,245 long tons (14,474 t) (max)
- Length: 441 feet 6 inches (135 m) oa; 416 feet (127 m) pp; 427 feet (130 m) lwl
- Beam: 57 feet (17 m)
- Draft: 27 ft 9.25 in (8.4646 m)
- Installed power: 2 × Oil fired 450 °F (232 °C) boilers, operating at 220 psi (1,500 kPa); 2,500 hp (1,900 kW)
- Propulsion: 1 × triple-expansion steam engine, (manufactured by General Machinery Corp., Hamilton, Ohio); 1 × screw propeller
- Speed: 11.5 knots (21.3 km/h; 13.2 mph)
- Capacity: 562,608 cubic feet (15,931 m^{3}) (grain); 499,573 cubic feet (14,146 m^{3}) (bale)
- Complement: 38–62 USMM; 21–40 USNAG
- Armament: Varied by ship; Bow-mounted 3-inch (76 mm)/50-caliber gun; Stern-mounted 4-inch (102 mm)/50-caliber gun; 2–8 × single 20-millimeter (0.79 in) Oerlikon anti-aircraft (AA) cannons and/or, 2–8 × 37-millimeter (1.46 in) M1 AA guns

SS Cassius Hudson was a Liberty ship built in the United States during World War II. She was named after Cassius Hudson, a Farm Demonstration Agent for the North Carolina Extension Service and developer of 4-H Youth Development programs.

== Construction ==
Cassius Hudson was laid down on 22 July 1944, under a United States Maritime Commission (MARCOM) contract, MC hull 2373, by J.A. Jones Construction, Brunswick, Georgia; she was sponsored by Miss Frances Hudson, and launched on 31 August 1944.

== History ==
She was allocated to the Alcoa Steamship Co., Inc., on 14 September 1944. On 16 October 1945, she struck a mine off Gibraltar, while sailing for Venice, she was taken under tow but struck another mine and was sunk at 45°32′N 13°12′E, near Trieste, Italy. On 20 February 1948, she was sold, along with 39 other vessels, including her sister ships SS Isaac Shelby and SS Niels Poulson, for $520,000, to Venturi Salvaggi Ricuperi Imprese Marittime Societa per Azioni, Genoa.

== Bibliography ==
- "Jones Construction, Brunswick GA". ShipbuildingHistory.com. 13 October 2010.
- "Liberty Ships – World War II".
- Maritime Administration. "Cassius Hudson". Ship History Database Vessel Status Card. U.S. Department of Transportation, Maritime Administration. Archived from the original on 12 December 2019.
- Davies, James (May 2004). "Specifications (As-Built)" (PDF). p. 23.
- "SS Cassius Hudson".
- "LIBERTY SHIPS - C".
