= Petrola =

Petrola may refer to

- Pétrola, a municipality in Albacete, Spain
- Petrola (oil) a Greek oil corporation, and the various ships it operated
  - Petrola I
  - Petrola II
  - Petrola XVII
  - Petrola XXXVI, later renamed Petrola 36
