= Sea Witch (container ship) =

American ship built in 1968

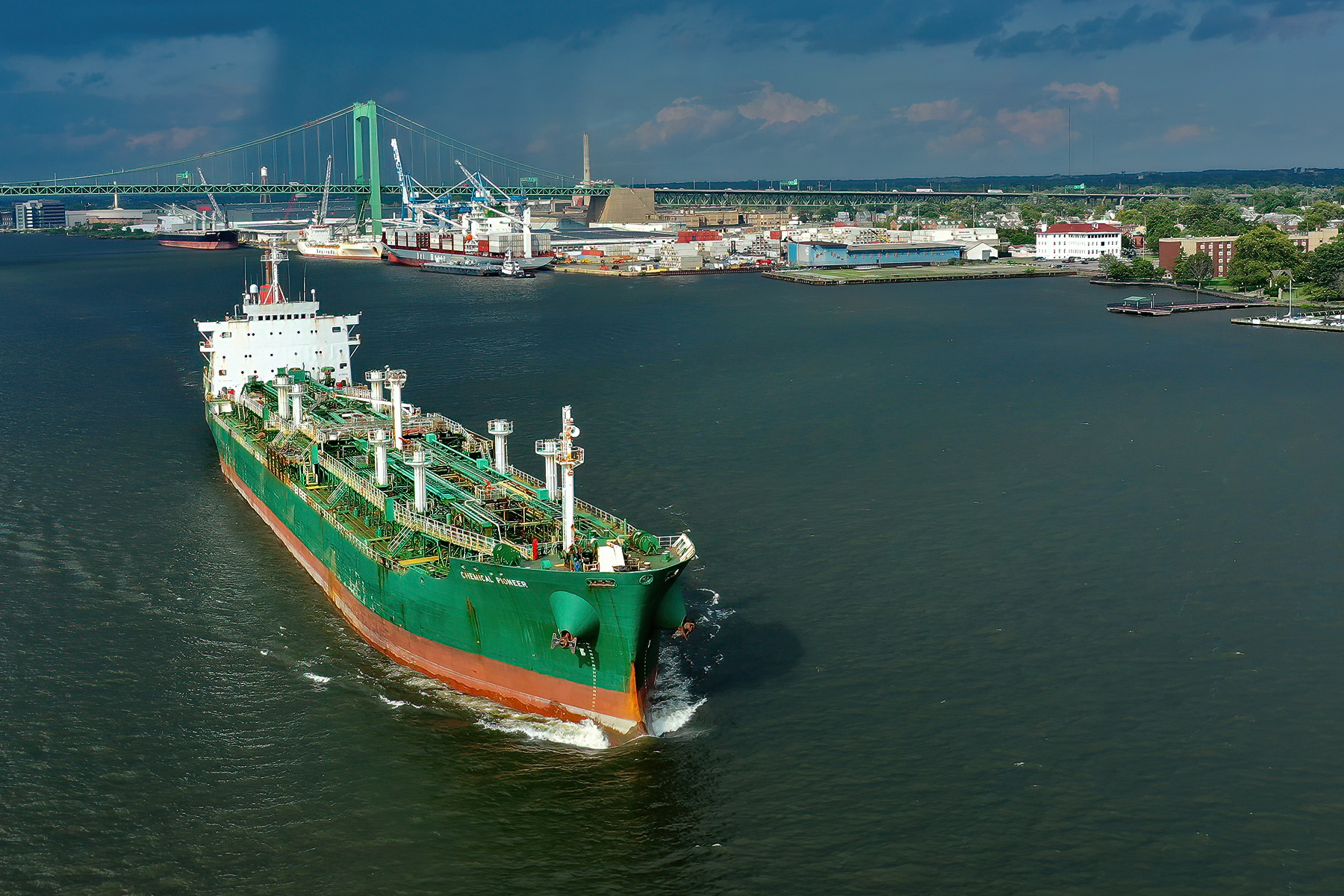
- As Chemical Pioneer passing Walt Whitman Bridge in Philadelphia, PA. (August, 2021)

History
- Name: Sea Witch
- Owner: American Export-Isbrandtsen Lines
- Port of registry: (United States)
- Builder: Bath Iron Works, Bath, ME
- Yard number: BIW 354
- Launched: 1968
- Completed: September 4, 1968
- In service: September 4, 1968
- Out of service: June 2, 1973
- Identification: IMO number: 6806444
- Fate: Damaged by collision and fire, removed from service.
- Name: Chemical Pioneer
- Owner: USCS Chemical Pioneer LLC
- Operator: USS Vessel Management LLC
- Port of registry: (United States)
- In service: 1985
- Identification: IMO number: 6806444; MMSI number: 366032000; Callsign: KAFO
- Fate: Scrapped 2023

General characteristics
- Class & type: Sea Witch Class C5-S-73B container ship
- Tonnage: 17,900
- Length: 610 ft (190 m)
- Beam: 76 ft (23 m)
- Draft: 35 ft (11 m)
- Installed power: 17,500 shp (13,000 kW)
- Propulsion: Two General Electric geared turbines, two boilers
- Speed: 20 knots (37 km/h)
- Capacity: 928 TEUs
- Crew: 40

Sea Witch was a MARAD Type C5-S-73b container ship built at the Bath Iron Works shipyard for American Export-Isbrandtsen Lines. She operated in the Atlantic trades for five years. So engaged on the evening of June 1, 1973, the vessel was involved in a disastrous collision with the oil tanker Esso Brussels in lower New York Harbor and was damaged so badly that she was removed from active service.

== Collision with Esso Brussels ==
Just before midnight on June 1, 1973, Sea Witch completed her port call at the Howland Hook Marine Terminal on Staten Island and departed for sea carrying a load of 445 containers below deck and 285 containers above deck. Under the command of Sandy Hook Pilot John T. (Jack) Cahill and her captain, John Paterson, the ship proceeded through the Kill van Kull towards lower New York Harbor and the Narrows, passing the Staten Island Ferry Terminal at 0029 hours on June 2. Directing the helmsman to bring the ship to a heading of 167 degrees in order to begin transiting the Narrows, Cahill also ordered the ship's speed increased to 13.4 knots, just shy of the maximum permitted harbor speed of 14 knots. With the ship now moving closer to 15 knots due to the effects of a strong 2-3 knot ebb tide as she passed by the general anchorage off Stapleton, Staten Island, Cahill ordered a course correction at 0036 hours to port to bring the ship's heading to 158 degrees to bring her in line with the center of the Verrazzano–Narrows Bridge.

The second turn never occurred. When the ship did not respond as expected the helmsman advised the captain that Sea Witch was no longer responding to steering inputs, Captain Paterson quickly ordered steering control transferred from the port side steering system to the starboard system, while Cahill ordered the rudder put hard over to port. Both the captain's and the pilot′s attempts to regain control of Sea Witch proved futile, as both the port and starboard steering systems were connected into a single mechanism atop the vessels rudder post by a faulty "key," a device similar to a cotter pin, which had failed. Without this small fastener in place all steering control of Sea Witch was lost, and with the ship rapidly moving out of the channel toward Staten Island Cahill ordered the engines to full astern, began sounding a series of short rapid blasts on the ship's whistle, and asked Captain Paterson to sound the general alarm to alert the ship's crew. After attempts by the chief mate and two able seaman stationed on the bow to release both of Sea Witch's anchors failed, Cahill locked the whistle to sound continuously to alert nearby vessels, particularly the nearby oil tanker SS Esso Brussels of her distress as she continued her turn towards the anchored, fully laden vessel.

Less than five minutes had passed from the initial loss of steering control aboard Sea Witch before she was within a ship's length from Esso Brussels′ midship, and with the ship still making 13 knots with her engines in full reverse and a collision now unavoidable, Cahill and Paterson ordered the crew off the bow and abandoned the forward superstructure. Aboard Esso Brussels, the 36-member crew had roughly two minutes′ warning of the impending collision before the sharply raked bow of Sea Witch, heavily reinforced for operations in icy harbors, rammed into the tanker at 0042 hours. Rather than crumpling and deforming from the force of its impact with the hull of Esso Brussels, Sea Witch′s bow retained its shape as its tore into three midship cargo tanks of Esso Brussels, locking both ships together and allowing a significant amount of her load of light Nigerian crude oil to spray onto both ships and spill into the surrounding waters. Sparks from the collision and severed electrical wiring quickly ignited the highly volatile oil and a tremendous explosion occurred, leaving both ships afire and wreathed in a large and growing pool of burning oil.

As the crew of Esso Brussels made their own attempt to abandon their ship, the crew aboard Sea Witch mustered in her aft superstructure, where they attempted to lower her aft lifeboats. Heavy smoke, heat, and a growing number of shrapnel-laced explosions from several burning containers filled with aerosol cans frustrated their initial efforts, and as the rapidly spreading burning oil slick enveloped the ship the effort was abandoned and the crew took shelter in a cabin equipped with a half-inch fire hose to await rescue. During this time, the still-engaged engines of Sea Witch began to pull the two ships into the center of the Narrows, where the burning pool of oil sent flames high enough to scorch the bottom of the Verrazzano–Narrows Bridge 228 feet (69 m) above the water's surface. Fortunately, the anchor chains on Esso Brussels parted at this point allowing both ships to pass under the bridge quickly, preventing the steel from suffering significant heat damage. Propelled by the outbound tide and the engines of Sea Witch, the two furiously burning ships proceeded into outer New York Harbor, where they ran hard aground in Gravesend Bay.

== Rescue ==
Within minutes of the initial collision and explosion, the Fire Department of New York (FDNY) fireboat Fire Fighter had departed its nearby station at Marine Company 9 in Stapleton and arrived at what the firefighters aboard would later describe as a sea of flames that extended 3,000 yards (2,700 m) in front of them. Initially assuming there had been an explosion on Esso Brussels, the fireboat began to pour water onto the ship from its starboard bow, keeping their ship upwind and upcurrent from the smoke and flames now heading towards the Verrazzano–Narrows Bridge. Following the inferno as it proceeded under the bridge and into Gravesend Bay, Fire Fighter maneuvered to a new position along the side of Esso Brussels and those aboard caught their first sight of the fully involved hull of Sea Witch and realized that there were actually two vessels involved in the fire instead of just one. Moving toward the stern of Sea Witch in an attempt to look for survivors, Fire Fighter and her crew found the entire ship enveloped by the burning slick and much of the after superstructure heavily aflame.

Aboard Sea Witch, the 31 surviving crewmen had been trapped in the rear cabin for more than half an hour, enduring dozens of close-quarter explosions from the ship's cargo and temperatures so high that the crew was forced to spray the surrounding bulkheads with water in order to stave off being baked to death. With both ships now grounded and the fires steadily progressing aft the crew aboard were left with little option but to abandon ship, leading Cahill to make a final effort to try to signal any of the tugs and fireboats now circling the burning vessels. Covering himself with a wet blanket to shield himself against the heat and flames, Cahill went to Sea Witch's stern and used his flashlight to signal a fireboat he could see in the distance. Quickly spotted by the astonished captain aboard Fire Fighter, the fireboat used its 5-inch (127-mm) bow monitor to cut a path through the burning slick in order to reach the stern of Sea Witch, and once in position used every monitor on board to keep the flames at bay as her crew rigged two ladders onto Sea Witch, allowing the 31 trapped men to descend to safety at 0145 hours. A further seven members of Sea Witch′s crew were recovered from the water surrounding the ship and the ship's electrician was rescued from aboard ship by the crew of M/V Brian McAllister at approximately 0245 hours. Musters would later reveal that three of Sea Witch′s crew had died, two men missing and presumed dead and her captain, who had died of an apparent heart attack while awaiting rescue. Esso Brussels had also lost her captain and twelve of her crew in the collision and subsequent fire.

== Aftermath ==
With all survivors accounted for, FDNY fireboats, United States Coast Guard cutters, and harbor tugs set about extinguishing the fires aboard the two ships, and by dawn on May 31 all fires aboard Esso Brussels were declared out and the two ships were separated. Initially ordered to use their maximum pumping capacity to snuff the heavy flames still burning aboard Sea Witch, the fireboat fleet was called off after the ship developed a 25° list to port and threatened to capsize. Electing to let the fire burn itself out, the captain of the port released all but one FDNY marine unit from the scene, the one which stayed remaining with the ship for a further 15 days until all fires were declared out on June 14, 1973.

Pumped out and placed under tow, the charred hulk of Sea Witch was moved to an outer pier at the Brooklyn Navy Yard in Brooklyn, where she would remain for the next eight years. Eventually sold to commercial interests, the hulk of Sea Witch was subsequently drydocked at Newport News Shipbuilding in Newport News, Virginia, and cut into two pieces; her still-operational stern and machinery spaces were rebuilt and attached to a newly built chemical tanker, Chemical Discoverer, which was operating in July 2020 as Chemical Pioneer. Sea Witch′s fire-damaged bow was relocated to the Baltimore, Maryland, scrapyard of Kurt Iron & Metals Company, where its former fuel tanks were used to store waste oils until being scrapped in 2008.

In October 2021, US Shipping Corp sold the Chemical Pioneer for scrap. She left Tioga Marine Terminal in Philadelphia on Tuesday, December 14 for Malta for bunkers with a final destination of Aliağa, Turkey, where she was beached in 2023. US Shipping was purchased in August 2021 by SEACOR Holdings and Chemical Pioneer was determined to be redundant during the merging of the two companies fleets.
