= Lester Wolfe =

American inventor

Lester Wolfe (1897 Chelsea, Massachusetts – July 6, 1983, Southampton, New York) was an inventor, president of William J. Rountree Company and steamship agent and broker whose will funded "fellowships for studies in molecular biology and for research using optical methods in the investigation of the structure and properties of matter." The Lester Wolfe Workshop in Laser Biomedicine is named after him.

Wolfe graduated from MIT in 1919 with a degree in physics. He worked as an inventor while serving in the military during World War I and earned a commendation for his Radiation Fuel Quantity Guage. He also invented the Sono-buoy to detect German submarines in World War II. A resident of Manhattan, Wolfe died of heart failure at his summer home.
