= SS James A. Wetmore =

World War II Liberty ship of the United States

History

United States
- Name: James A. Wetmore
- Namesake: James A. Wetmore
- Owner: War Shipping Administration (WSA)
- Operator: William J. Rountree Company
- Ordered: as type (EC2-S-C1) hull, MC hull 1502
- Builder: J.A. Jones Construction, Brunswick, Georgia
- Cost: $1,753,260
- Yard number: 118
- Way number: 2
- Laid down: 14 August 1943
- Launched: 30 October 1943
- Completed: 11 November 1943
- Identification: Call Signal: KTMN
- Fate: Laid up in National Defense Reserve Fleet, Wilmington, North Carolina, 29 May 1948; Sold for scrapping, 19 January 1967

General characteristics
- Class & type: Liberty ship; type EC2-S-C1, standard
- Tonnage: 10,865 LT DWT; 7,176 GRT
- Displacement: 3,380 long tons (3,434 t) (light); 14,245 long tons (14,474 t) (max)
- Length: 441 feet 6 inches (135 m) oa; 416 feet (127 m) pp; 427 feet (130 m) lwl
- Beam: 57 feet (17 m)
- Draft: 27 ft 9.25 in (8.4646 m)
- Installed power: 2 × Oil fired 450 °F (232 °C) boilers, operating at 220 psi (1,500 kPa); 2,500 hp (1,900 kW)
- Propulsion: 1 × triple-expansion steam engine, (manufactured by General Machinery Corp., Hamilton, Ohio); 1 × screw propeller
- Speed: 11.5 knots (21.3 km/h; 13.2 mph)
- Capacity: 562,608 cubic feet (15,931 m^{3}) (grain); 499,573 cubic feet (14,146 m^{3}) (bale)
- Complement: 38–62 USMM; 21–40 USNAG
- Armament: Varied by ship; Bow-mounted 3-inch (76 mm)/50-caliber gun; Stern-mounted 4-inch (102 mm)/50-caliber gun; 2–8 × single 20-millimeter (0.79 in) Oerlikon anti-aircraft (AA) cannons and/or, 2–8 × 37-millimeter (1.46 in) M1 AA guns

SS James A. Wetmore was a Liberty ship built in the United States during World War II. She was named after James A. Wetmore, the Acting Supervising Architect of the United States, from 1915 to 1933.

== Construction ==
James A. Wetmore was laid down on 14 August 1943, under a United States Maritime Commission (MARCOM) contract, MC hull 1502, by J.A. Jones Construction, Brunswick, Georgia, and launched on 30 October 1943.

== History ==
She was allocated to William J. Rountree Company, on 11 November 1943. On 29 May 1948, she was laid up in the National Defense Reserve Fleet in Wilmington, North Carolina. On 19 January 1967, she was sold to Northern Metal Company, for $46,000, for scrapping. She was delivered on 18 February 1967.

== Bibliography ==
- "Jones Construction, Brunswick GA". ShipbuildingHistory.com. 13 October 2010.
- "Liberty Ships – World War II".
- Maritime Administration. "James A. Wetmore". Ship History Database Vessel Status Card. U.S. Department of Transportation, Maritime Administration. Archived from the original on 12 December 2019.
- Davies, James (May 2004). "Specifications (As-Built)" (PDF). p. 23.
- "SS James A. Wetmore".
