= SS Owen Wister =

Liberty ship of WWII

History

United States
- Name: Owen Wister
- Namesake: Owen Wister
- Owner: War Shipping Administration (WSA)
- Operator: William J. Rountree Company
- Ordered: as type (EC2-S-C1) hull, MC hull 1216
- Builder: St. Johns River Shipbuilding Company, Jacksonville, Florida
- Cost: $1,389,365
- Yard number: 24
- Way number: 6
- Laid down: 2 November 1943
- Launched: 14 December 1943
- Sponsored by: Mrs. William L. Marshall
- Completed: 24 December 1943
- Identification: Call sign: KVGS
- Fate: Laid up in the, National Defense Reserve Fleet, Astoria, Oregon, 22 July 1949; Laid up in the, National Defense Reserve Fleet, Astoria, Oregon, 26 June 1952; Sold for scrapping, 8 December 1964, removed from fleet, 21 December 1964

General characteristics
- Class & type: Liberty ship; type EC2-S-C1, standard
- Tonnage: 10,865 LT DWT; 7,176 GRT
- Displacement: 3,380 long tons (3,434 t) (light); 14,245 long tons (14,474 t) (max)
- Length: 441 feet 6 inches (135 m) oa; 416 feet (127 m) pp; 427 feet (130 m) lwl
- Beam: 57 feet (17 m)
- Draft: 27 ft 9.25 in (8.4646 m)
- Installed power: 2 × Oil fired 450 °F (232 °C) boilers, operating at 220 psi (1,500 kPa); 2,500 hp (1,900 kW)
- Propulsion: 1 × triple-expansion steam engine, (manufactured by General Machinery Corp., Hamilton, Ohio); 1 × screw propeller
- Speed: 11.5 knots (21.3 km/h; 13.2 mph)
- Capacity: 562,608 cubic feet (15,931 m^{3}) (grain); 499,573 cubic feet (14,146 m^{3}) (bale)
- Complement: 38–62 USMM; 21–40 USNAG
- Armament: Varied by ship; Bow-mounted 3-inch (76 mm)/50-caliber gun; Stern-mounted 4-inch (102 mm)/50-caliber gun; 2–8 × single 20-millimeter (0.79 in) Oerlikon anti-aircraft (AA) cannons and/or, 2–8 × 37-millimeter (1.46 in) M1 AA guns

SS Owen Wister was a Liberty ship built in the United States during World War II. She was named after Owen Wister, an American writer and historian, considered the "father" of western fiction. He is best remembered for writing The Virginian and a biography of Ulysses S. Grant.

== Construction ==
Owen Wister was laid down on 2 November 1943, under a Maritime Commission (MARCOM) contract, MC hull 1216, by the St. Johns River Shipbuilding Company, Jacksonville, Florida; she was sponsored by Mrs. William L. Marshall, the wife of Gulf Coast Regional construction auditor for MARCOM, and was launched on 14 December 1943.

== History ==
She was allocated to William J. Rountree Company, on 24 December 1943. On 22 July 1949, she was laid up in the National Defense Reserve Fleet, Astoria, Oregon. On 28 June 1954, she was withdrawn from the fleet to be loaded with grain under the "Grain Program 1954", she returned loaded on 17 July 1954. On 3 November 1956, she was withdrawn to be unload, she returned on empty 9 November 1956. She was sold for scrapping, 8 December 1964, to Zidell Explorations, Inc., for $156,006.66, which included her sister ships SS Robert E. Clarkson and SS William C. Endicott. She was removed from the fleet on 21 December 1964.

== Bibliography ==
- "St. John's River Shipbuilding, Jacksonville FL". www.ShipbuildingHistory.com. 16 October 2010.
- Maritime Administration. "Owen Wister". Ship History Database Vessel Status Card. U.S. Department of Transportation, Maritime Administration.
- Davies, James (May 2004). "Specifications (As-Built)" (PDF). p. 23.
- "SS Owen Wister".
