= SS Salvador Brau =

World War II Liberty ship of the United States

History

United States
- Name: Salvador Brau
- Namesake: Salvador Brau
- Owner: War Shipping Administration (WSA)
- Operator: William J. Rountree Company
- Ordered: as type (EC2-S-C1) hull, MC hull 1543
- Builder: J.A. Jones Construction, Panama City, Florida
- Cost: $1,306,833
- Yard number: 25
- Way number: 3
- Laid down: 8 November 1943
- Launched: 15 December 1943
- Completed: 31 January 1944
- Identification: Call Signal: KUWA
- Fate: Laid up in National Defense Reserve Fleet Beaumont, Texas, 1 June 1948; Sold for scrapping, 16 November 1966

General characteristics
- Class & type: Liberty ship; type EC2-S-C1, standard
- Tonnage: 10,865 LT DWT; 7,176 GRT
- Displacement: 3,380 long tons (3,434 t) (light); 14,245 long tons (14,474 t) (max)
- Length: 441 feet 6 inches (135 m) oa; 416 feet (127 m) pp; 427 feet (130 m) lwl
- Beam: 57 feet (17 m)
- Draft: 27 ft 9.25 in (8.4646 m)
- Installed power: 2 × Oil fired 450 °F (232 °C) boilers, operating at 220 psi (1,500 kPa); 2,500 hp (1,900 kW)
- Propulsion: 1 × triple-expansion steam engine, (manufactured by General Machinery Corp., Hamilton, Ohio); 1 × screw propeller
- Speed: 11.5 knots (21.3 km/h; 13.2 mph)
- Capacity: 562,608 cubic feet (15,931 m^{3}) (grain); 499,573 cubic feet (14,146 m^{3}) (bale)
- Complement: 38–62 USMM; 21–40 USNAG
- Armament: Varied by ship; Bow-mounted 3-inch (76 mm)/50-caliber gun; Stern-mounted 4-inch (102 mm)/50-caliber gun; 2–8 × single 20-millimeter (0.79 in) Oerlikon anti-aircraft (AA) cannons and/or, 2–8 × 37-millimeter (1.46 in) M1 AA guns

SS Salvador Brau was a Liberty ship built in the United States during World War II. She was named after Salvador Brau, a journalist, poet, dramatist, novelist, historian, and sociologist. He was designated the official historian of Puerto Rico in 1903, by the first American-appointed governor William Henry Hunt.

== Construction ==
Salvador Brau was laid down on 8 November 1943, under a United States Maritime Commission (MARCOM) contract, MC hull 1543, by J.A. Jones Construction, Panama City, Florida; she was launched on 15 December 1943.

== History ==
She was allocated to William J. Rountree Company, on 31 January 1944. On 1 June 1948, she was laid up in the National Defense Reserve Fleet, in Beaumont, Texas. On 16 November 1966, she was sold for $45,179.79 to Southern Scrap Material Co., Ltd., for scrapping. She was withdrawn from the fleet on 21 December 1966.

== Bibliography ==
- "Jones Construction, Panama City FL". ShipbuildingHistory.com. 13 October 2010.
- "Liberty Ships – World War II".
- Maritime Administration. "Salvador Brau". Ship History Database Vessel Status Card. U.S. Department of Transportation, Maritime Administration. Archived from the original on 12 December 2019.
- Davies, James (May 2004). "Specifications (As-Built)" (PDF). p. 23.
- "SS Salvador Brau".
