= SS El Estero =

Ammunition ship that caught fire in New York Harbor in 1943

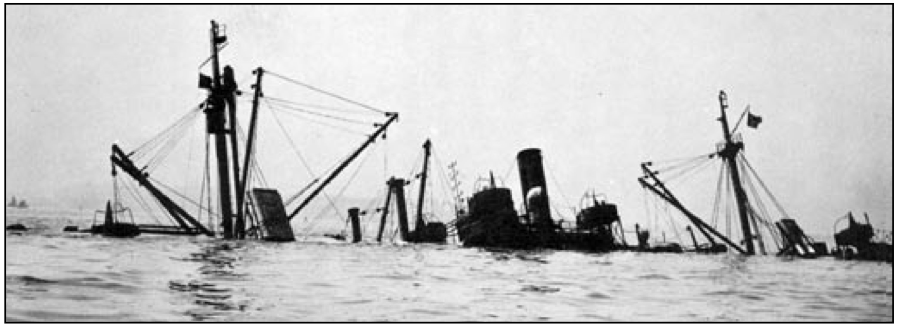
- SS El Estero with a full load of ammunition resting on the bottom of New York Harbor after being filled with water to put out a fire that threatened a major explosion. She is still flying the red signal flag B indicating dangerous cargo.

History

Panama
- Name: SS El Estero
- Operator: United States Lines July 7, 1941 to Jan. 4, 1943; William J. Rountree Company, Jan. 4, 1943 to April 24, 1943
- Builder: Downey Shipbuilding
- Yard number: 12
- Launched: September 16, 1920
- Completed: September 1920
- Out of service: April 24, 1943
- Fate: Scuttled due to onboard fire, expended as Naval Gunnery target.

General characteristics
- Tonnage: 4,219 GRT
- Length: 102 m (335 ft)
- Beam: 14.4 m (47 ft)
- Installed power: 2,500 Horsepower
- Propulsion: Triple expansion steam engine
- Speed: 12 knots (22 km/h; 14 mph)

SS El Estero was a ship filled with ammunition that caught fire at dockside in New York Harbor in 1943, but was successfully moved away and sunk by the heroic efforts of tugboat and fireboat crews, averting a major disaster.

== The ship ==
The El Estero was built as a general cargo steamship for the Southern Pacific Steamship Lines at the Downey Shipbuilding Yard in Staten Island, New York and delivered for service in September 1920. The first of three sister ships built for the line, El Estero was operated by the Morgan Line in the short-sea shipping trade primarily between the ports of New York City, Baltimore and Galveston for much of her commercial service life.

Acquired by the US Maritime Commission on June 10, 1941, as part of an effort to increase US-Flag merchant marine shipping capacity, El Estero was purchased from Southern Pacific and placed operation with United States Lines under a Panamanian registry. Pressed into service carrying war supplies from the United States to Europe during World War II, the ship made several Atlantic crossings in convoys which frequently came under U-boat attack, including Convoy PQ 13 in March 1942. Continued this duty until Jan. 4, 1943. On Jan. 4, 1943 operation of the ship was turned over to William J. Rountree Company.El Estero put into New York Harbor in early April 1943 where she waited her turn to load munitions at the long finger pier of the New York Port of Embarkation's Caven Point Terminal off Jersey City, New Jersey.

== The fire ==
El Estero had taken on 1,365 tons of mixed munitions on April 24, 1943, and was preparing to depart at approximately 5:30PM when a boiler flashback started a fire on oily water in her bilges which quickly grew out of control.

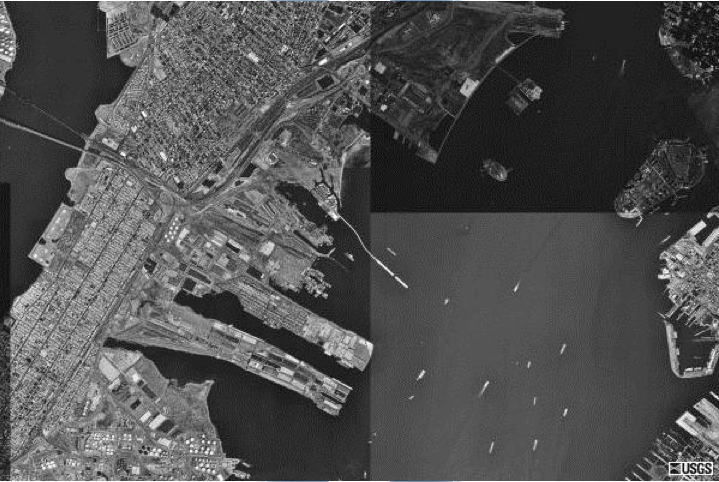
Upper New York Bay with Caven Point Pier (thin white line in the center), where El Estero was moored when it caught fire

The fire brought an immediate response of five fire trucks from the Jersey City Fire Department, two 30-foot fireboats, and roughly 60 volunteers from the U.S. Coast Guard to battle and contain the flames aboard the ship, which was moored directly opposite two other fully loaded ammunition ships and two ammunition-laden railroad boxcars. More than 5,000 tons of ammunition was in immediate danger of being set off by the fire on El Estero (comparable to a tactical nuclear weapon), and fire fighting efforts began in earnest. It was quickly discovered that the location and intensity of the fire prevented access to the ships' seacocks, making it impossible to scuttle the ship, so the New York City Fire Department dispatched its two most powerful fireboats: Fire Fighter and John J. Harvey.

The fireboats arrived at 6:30 p.m. and immediately ran hoses up to Coast Guardsmen on the burning ship, then took positions directly alongside El Estero, as a trio of commercial tugboats made up a towline to her bow and began pulling her off the Caven Point Pier towards open waters on through The Narrows. There was a high probability that the ship's volatile cargo could explode at any moment, but the Coast Guardsmen, fire fighters, and tug crews continued their efforts to contain the fire and to save as much of the ship and cargo as possible. However, the Port Admiral of New York Harbor soon ordered the ship to be sunk. The fireboats then moved to a shallow area of water off of Constable Hook in Bayonne, New Jersey near Robbins Reef Light in Upper New York Bay and began pumping 38,000 gallons of water per minute into El Estero's cargo holds, which succeeded in swamping the ship and sending her to the bottom shortly after 9 p.m. with much of her superstructure still above the surface. All hot spots were declared extinguished by 11:30 p.m. on the 24th, and what is considered to have been the single greatest threat to New York City during World War II passed without major incident or loss of life.

== Aftermath ==
With a shroud of secrecy soon in place over the events surrounding the sinking of El Estero due in large part to the then-classified mission of the Caven Point Army Depot, public knowledge of the near disaster remained low until 1944 when the first of several awards for heroism were distributed to the first responders. El Estero herself would remain in her sunken state for the better part of four months before the still-loaded ship was finally raised from the seafloor and towed out of the harbor for use as a naval gunnery target.

Her untimely end and its legacy are still very much visible today in the modern-day Sandy Hook Bay, where in August 1943 the US Navy began construction of a new ammunition depot in New Jersey, now known as Naval Weapons Station Earle which features a 2.9-mile pier designed to move the hazardous activity of loading and unloading munitions away from densely populated areas. Over half a century later, both the Fire Fighter and John J. Harvey, the latter then a museum ship, helped fight fires at Ground Zero in the aftermath of the September 11, 2001 attacks.

== See also ==
- List of accidents and incidents involving transport or storage of ammunition
