= William J. Rountree Company =

Former US Shipping and ship broker company

- Industry: Transportation and shipping
- Founded: 1912 in New York City
- Key people: William J. Rountree; Leater Wolfe; Albert E. Gorge; Lowell Lincoln Richards VP; Lowell Richards VP

William J. Rountree Company was a steamship agent and broker company founded by William J. Rountree in New York City in 1912. William J. Rountree Company was active in supporting the World War II effort by chartering and operating Liberty ships and Victory ships.

== History ==
William J. Rountree was born on May 22, 1882, in New York City. In 1901 he and his brother John Rountree became ship brokers in New York City. William J. Rountree started his own ship broker firm in 1912 William J. Rountree Company, In 1935 William J. Rountree Company became the US agent for the Chilean North American Line. William J. Rountree Company was also the US general agent for Mitsul Line, of the Mitsui Steamship Company Ltd., with routes between Japan and the United States in the 1950s. William J. Rountree Company was also President of the Ship Operators and Owners Association founded in March 1943 at the request of Admiral Emory S. Land.

- Lester Wolfe (1897–1983) one of the presidents of William J. Rountree Company invented the Sonobuoy that help the American armed forces in World War II. The Sonobuoy is a radio device that helped find enemy submarines. Lester Wolfe also invented "Radiation Fuel Quantity Gauge", which was used in place of a fuel gauge in American fighter planes. Wolfe graduated from Massachusetts Institute of Technology in 1919 with a degree in physics. During his US Army tour in World War I, he worked as an inventor.

== World War II ==
William J. Rountree Company ships were used to help the World War II effort. During World War II William J. Rountree Company operated Merchant navy ships for the United States Shipping Board. During World War II William J. Rountree Company was active with charter shipping with the Maritime Commission and War Shipping Administration. William J. Rountree Company operated Liberty ships and Victory ships for the merchant navy. The ship was run by its William J. Rountree Company crew and the US Navy supplied United States Navy Armed Guards to man the deck guns and radio.

== Ships ==
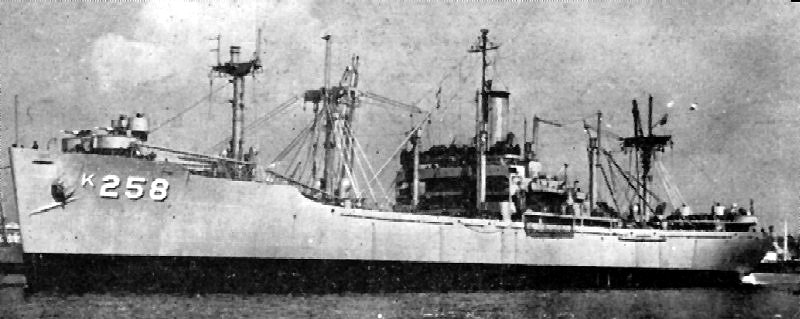
A Victory ship of World War II

Liberty ship of World War II

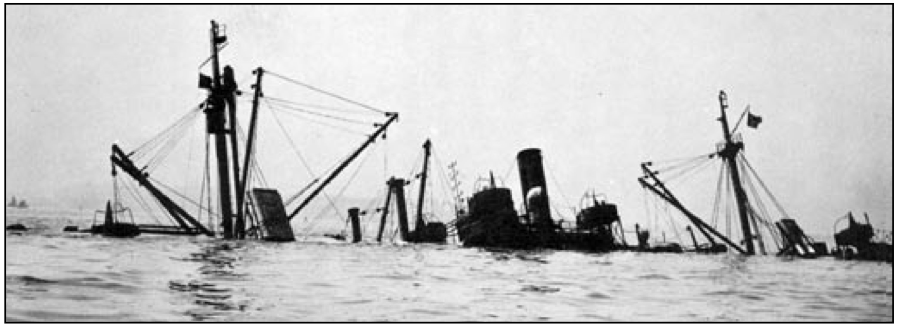
SS El Estero with a full load of ammunition resting on the bottom in New York Harbor after being filled with water on the night of April 24, 1943 to put out a fire on board that threatened a major explosion

  - World War II operated ships:
  - Liberty Ships:
- SS John Owen
- SS Stepas Darius built in 1944 by the J. A. Jones Construction Co.
- SS Salvador Brau
- SS Owen Wister
- SS James A. Wetmore
- SS Lunsford Richardson
- SS Augustine B. McManus
- SS John H. Hammond On July 17, 1945, hit mined and damaged off Elba, towed to Naples, but was total lose, in 1948 Scrapped Savona.
- Nachman Syrkin
- Jose G. Benitez
- Park Holland
- Lucius Fairchild
- Wilfred R. Bellevue
- William D. Bloxham
- Ernest W. Gibson
- Richard J. Hopkins
- William W. Johnson
- Jesse Billingsley

- Victory ships:
- C.C.N.Y. Victory, named after City College of New York
- Biddeford Victory, named after Biddeford, Maine
- Howard Victory, named after Howard University

  - Other
- SS El Estero, built in 1920, William J. Rountree Company took over operations of the ship on Jan. 4, 1943. On April 26, 1943, the ship was declared a total lost due to onboard fire in New York Harbor.

== See also ==
- World War II United States Merchant Navy
