= Fire Fighter (fireboat) =

New York City fireboat

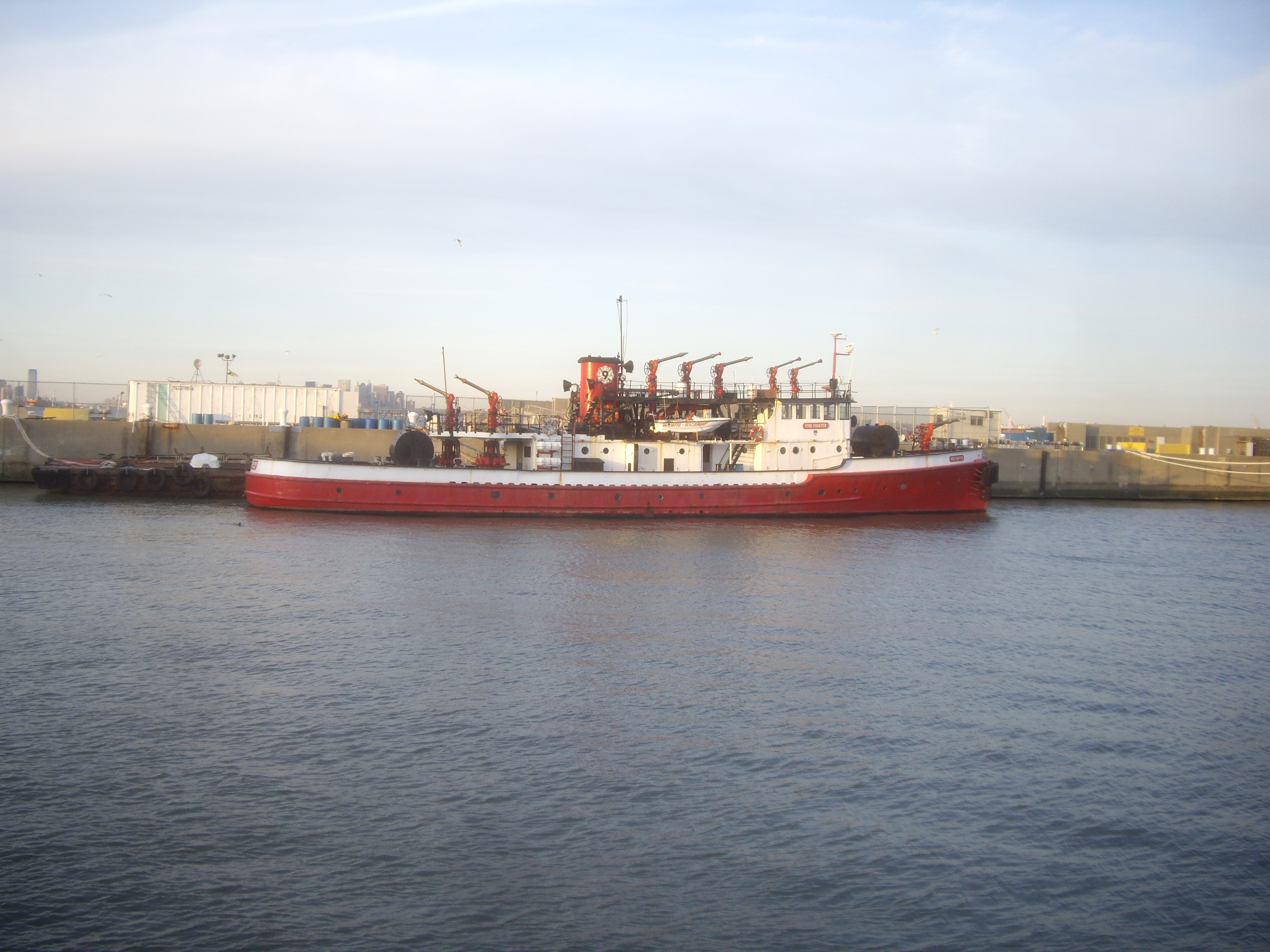
- Fireboat Fire Fighter

History

New York City Fire Department
- Name: Fire Fighter
- Operator: New York City Fire Department
- Builder: United Shipyards
- Laid down: 1937
- Launched: August 26, 1938
- Christened: August 26, 1938
- Commissioned: November 16, 1938
- Decommissioned: July 17, 2010
- Home port: New York City
- Nickname(s): The Fighter
- Honors and awards: 1974 Merchant Marine Gallant Ship Citation
- Fate: Museum Ship

General characteristics
- Tonnage: 220.44 net
- Length: 134 ft (41 m)
- Beam: 32 ft (9.8 m)
- Height: 25 ft (7.6 m)
- Draft: 9 ft (2.7 m)
- Installed power: Twin 1500 hp, 16-cylinder, 3968 CID General Motors Winton diesel engines
- Propulsion: Twin Westinghouse 1000 hp Electric Propulsion Motors
- Speed: 14 knots (16 mph)
- Capacity: 20,000gpm
- Crew: 7-11
- Fire Fighter (fireboat)
- U.S. National Register of Historic Places
- U.S. National Historic Landmark
- Location within Long Island Location within New York Location within the United States
- Location: Mystic Seaport
- Built: 1938
- Built by: United Shipyards
- Architect: William Francis Gibbs
- NRHP reference No.: 89001447

Significant dates
- Added to NRHP: June 30, 1989
- Designated NHL: June 30, 1989

Merchant Marine Gallant Ship Citation
- Awarded for: Actions on May 30th, 1973 following the collision of the SS Esso Brussels and SS Sea Witch and the rescue of 31 trapped crew from life-threatening fire aboard the SS Sea Witch.
- Presented by: United States Maritime Administration

Fire Fighter is a fireboat which served the New York City Fire Department from 1938 through 2010, serving with Marine Companies 1, 8 and 9 during her career. The most powerful diesel-electric fireboat in terms of pumping capacity when built in 1938, Fire Fighter fought more than 50 major fires during her career, including fires aboard the SS Normandie in 1942 and the SS El Estero in 1943, the 1973 collision of the Esso Brussels and SS Sea Witch, and the terrorist attacks on September 11, 2001.

== Service history ==
Authorized for construction in early 1937 by Mayor Fiorello LaGuardia based on designs submitted by noted naval architect William Francis Gibbs and his firm Gibbs & Cox, Fire Fighter was laid down at United Shipyards as Hull #856 and was christened and launched on August 28, 1938, by Eleanor Grace Flanagan. After fitting out and sea trials, Fire Fighter officially entered service with the New York City Fire Department at 9:00 a.m. on November 16, 1938, with Engine 57 at the Battery, as well as Pier 1 by the mid 1940s. Serving from this post until 1955 when she was Replaced as Engine 57 by the John D. McKean, Fire Fighter would respond to two of her most famous actions; the fire and capsizing of the SS Normandie in 1942 and the fire aboard the ammunition-laden SS El Estero in 1943, among dozens of other vessel and pier fires across New York Harbor.

Shifting with the majority of commercial steamship line freight operations from Manhattan to the Brooklyn waterfront, Fire Fighter served as Engine 223 and later Marine 8 at the 37th Street Pier until 1959, where she moved to Marine 5 for a few months. She then moved to Marine 3 that same year and in 1962 she was taken out of service for a rebuilding of the boat, which included removing her 55' Tower. before shifting once again to the Staten Island Ferry Terminal on Staten Island, later the Homeport Pier in Stapleton where she joined Marine Unit 9, an assignment which made her the first-due marine firefighting asset at the heavily trafficked Narrows of New York Harbor and throughout the tight confines of both the Arthur Kill and Kill van Kull. With both waterways already heavily utilized by marine traffic calling at ports on the Chemical Coast, the rise of both the Port Newark-Elizabeth Marine Terminal and Howland Hook Marine Terminal saw an increasing number of container ships transiting the same waters. These conditions led to several major vessel collisions and shoreside fires during her tenure in Staten Island, but the 1973 collision of SS Esso Brussels and SS Sea Witch would prove to be the largest fires she would ever fight single-handedly. For her and her crew's part in the response, firefighting and rescue of 31 surviving crewmen from the burning SS Sea Witch, the Fire Fighter was named a Gallant Ship and her crew received the American Merchant Marine Seamanship Trophy. To date, Fire Fighter remains the only fireboat to have received this award.

A 1974 article in The New York Times described how fires in New Jersey frequently resulted in requests to the FDNY commissioner for the loan of Fire Fighter. Once authorized it would take Fire Fighter approximately 45 minutes to arrive at waterfront communities such as Carteret.

The boat, as Firefighter, was declared a U.S. National Historic Landmark in 1989.

On September 11, 2001, Fire Fighter, along with the rest of the FDNY Marine Units, responded to the terrorist attack on the World Trade Center and took up a station at the foot of Albany Street in Battery Park City and began pumping at her maximum capacity to supply water to landside units fighting fires in the still-standing towers. Following the collapse of both buildings and resultant failure of the majority of the water mains serving lower Manhattan, Fire Fighter and the rest of the FDNY Marine Units became the sole source of water for firefighting efforts at Ground Zero, a duty which Fire Fighter maintained for a period of three weeks until sufficient repairs were completed on landside water mains to permit her release from what had become her longest emergency response call. Following a shipyard period in 2003 to rebuild her worn-out engines, the Fire Fighter resumed her post and continued to respond to marine emergencies, including a gasoline barge explosion in Port Mobil, Staten Island, in February 2003, and to the ditching of US Airways Flight 1549 on the Hudson River in 2009.

Replaced in frontline service by the fireboat Fire Fighter II, in 2010 at Marine Unit 9, Fire Fighter was placed into reserve status at the former Brooklyn Navy Yard where she remained in FDNY custody until October 15, 2012. Transferred on that date to the ownership of the non-profit Fireboat Fire Fighter Museum, Fire Fighter is now operated by an all-volunteer group dedicated to preserving the historic fireboat in running condition as a museum ship, befitting her over 70 years of service to the people and mariners of New York City and New York Harbor.

== As a museum ship ==
Under the stewardship of the museum, Fire Fighter found a home in Greenport, New York, on Long Island's North Fork and relocated to the village from the Brooklyn Navy Yard in February 2013. Eventually shifting to the village's commercial pier in accordance with their contractual agreement with the village, the museum has continued to grow in popularity and was granted 501(c)(3) status by the IRS in October 2013 as a tax-exempt non-profit organization. The museum was awarded a National Park Service Maritime Heritage Grant in 2014 to pursue hull upkeep and preventative maintenance shipyard work.

Gathering matching funds for the National Park Service grant lasted through December 2016, when Fire Fighter reported to Goodison Shipyard in Kingston, Rhode Island, for four months of shipyard work, overhaul and hull inspection. Completed in April 2017, Fire Fighter returned to Greenport, New York, in her as-built, late 1930 FDNY color scheme, with a black hull, white topsides and buff smokestack, and with all topside brass returned to its bare metal appearance. As of the summer of 2021, the vessel is currently on exhibit at the Mystic Seaport Museum in Mystic, CT.

== Photo gallery ==
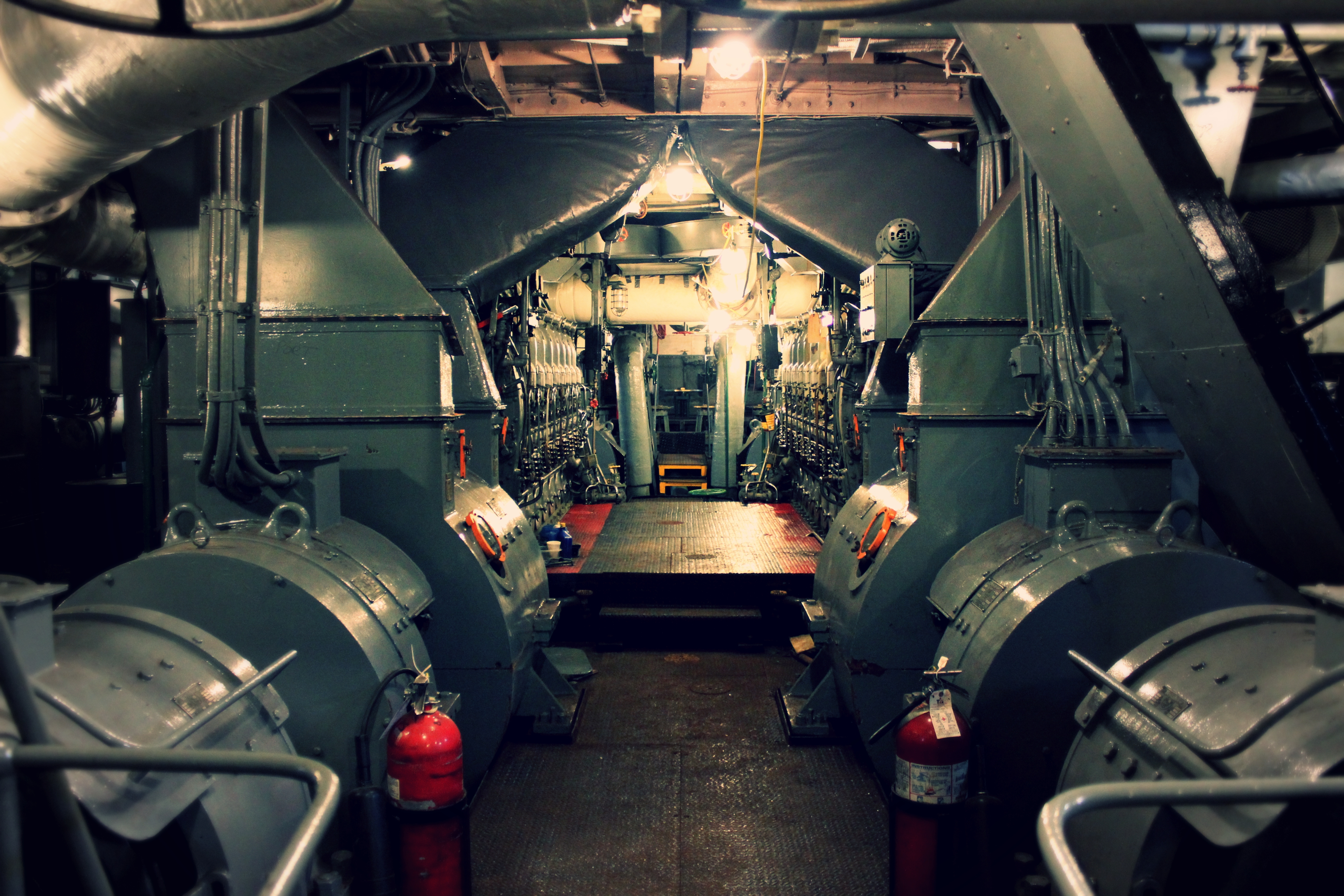
Fire Fighter's engineering space containing her four DeLaval 5,000gpm fire pumps, twin 16-cylinder 1500HP main engines and electric propulsion motors

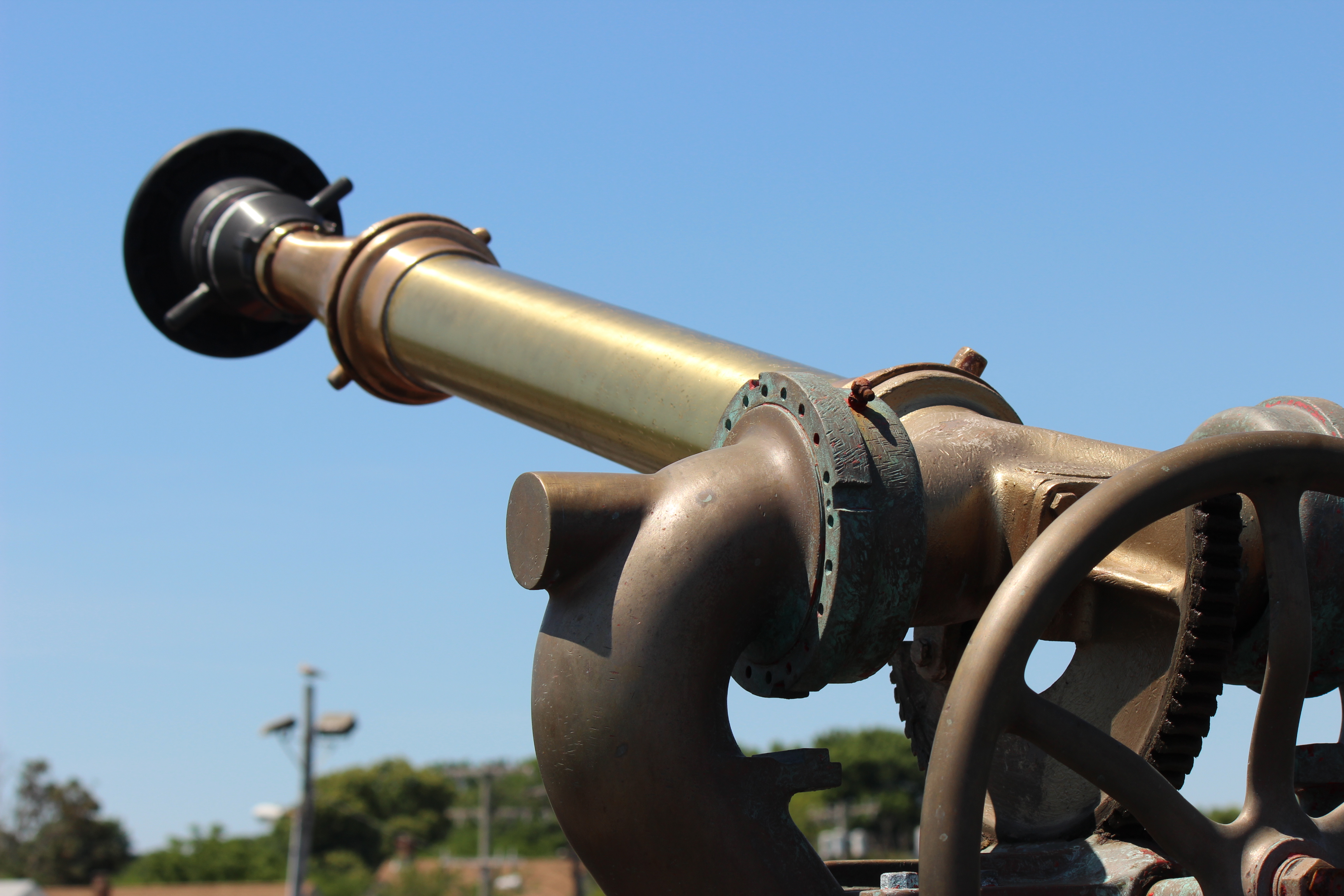
One of Fire Fighter's smaller 2,000gpm monitors, located on her fore Portside top deck

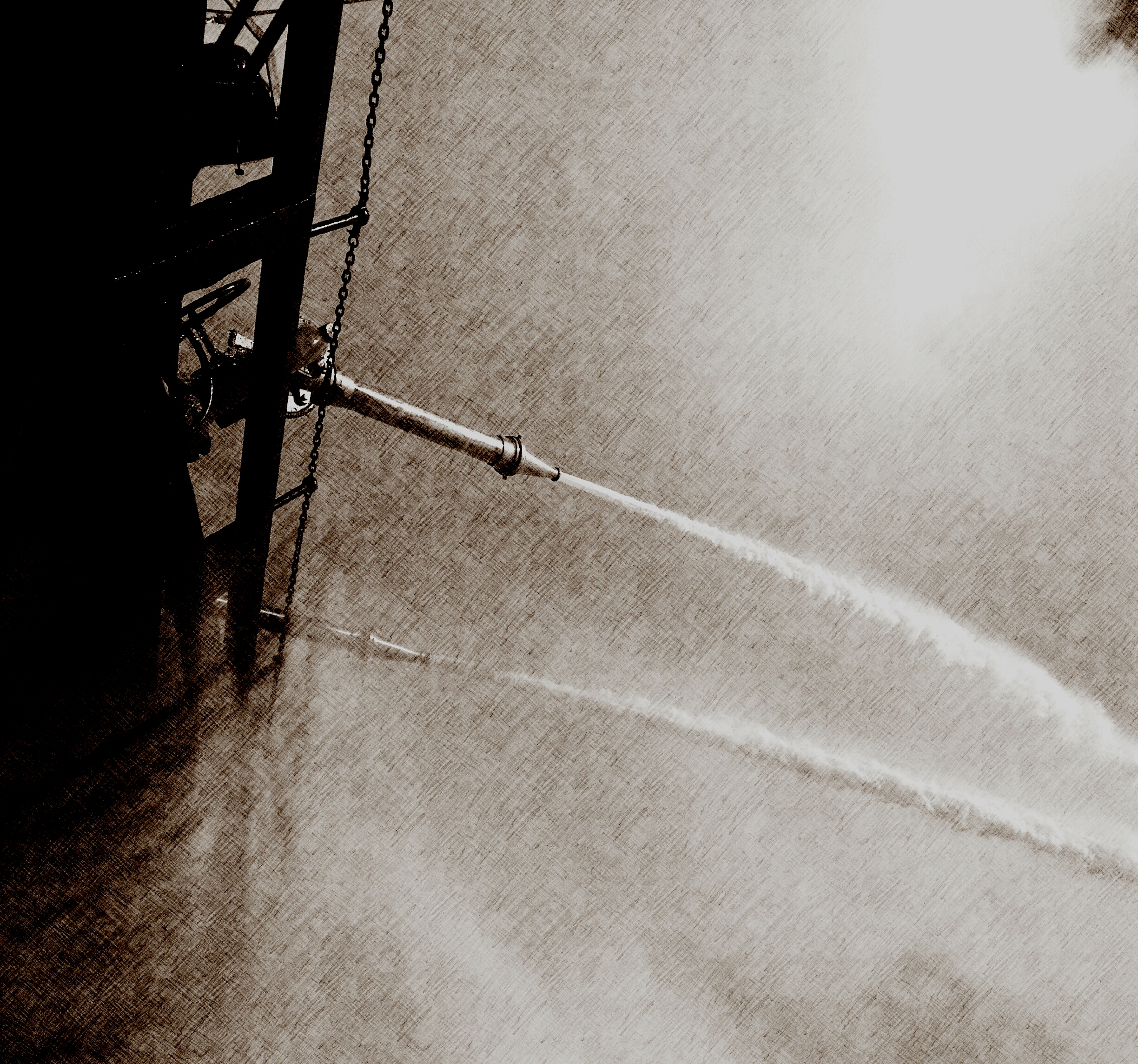
Fire Fighter 's water monitors in operation

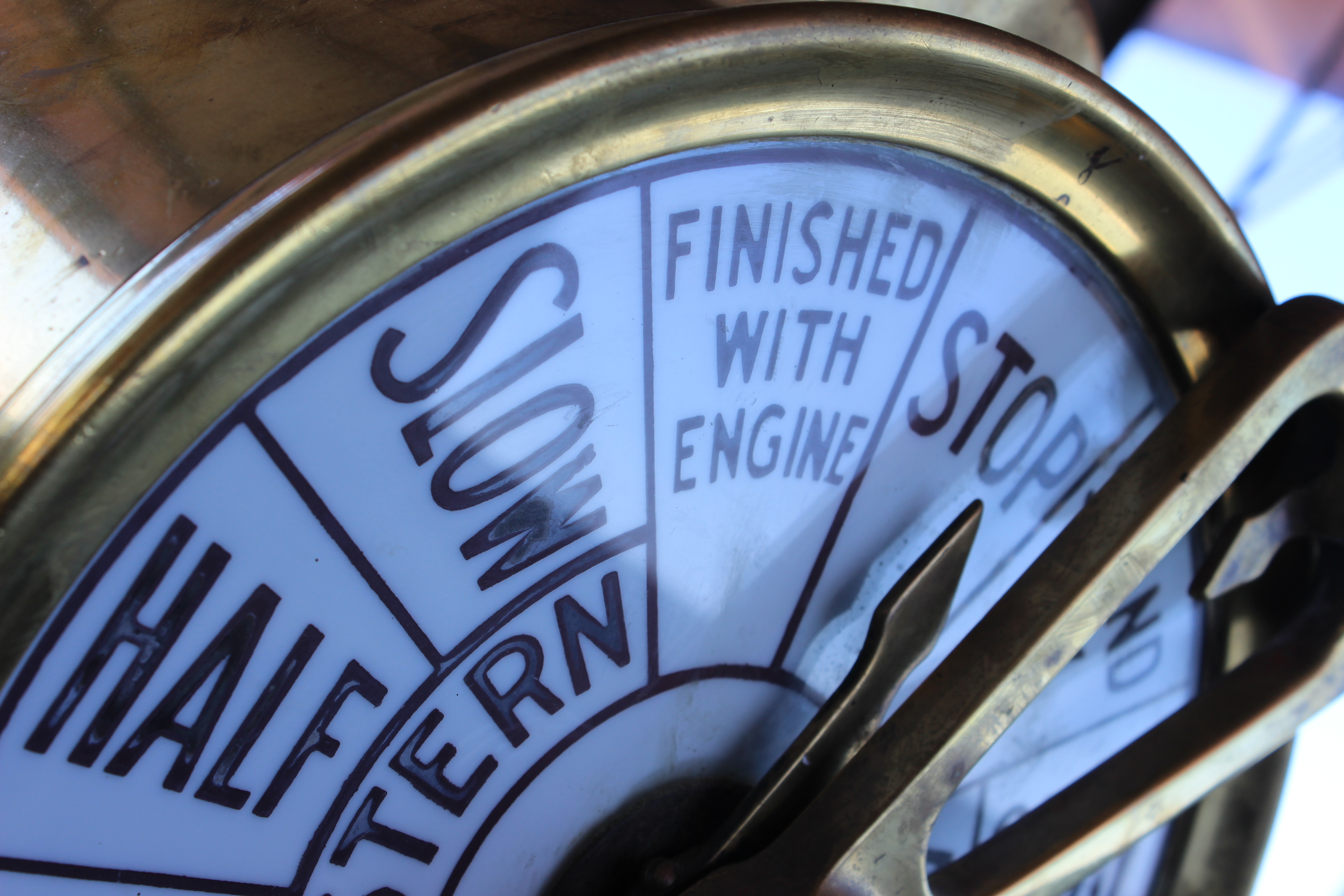
Fire Fighter's original 1938 engine order telegraph

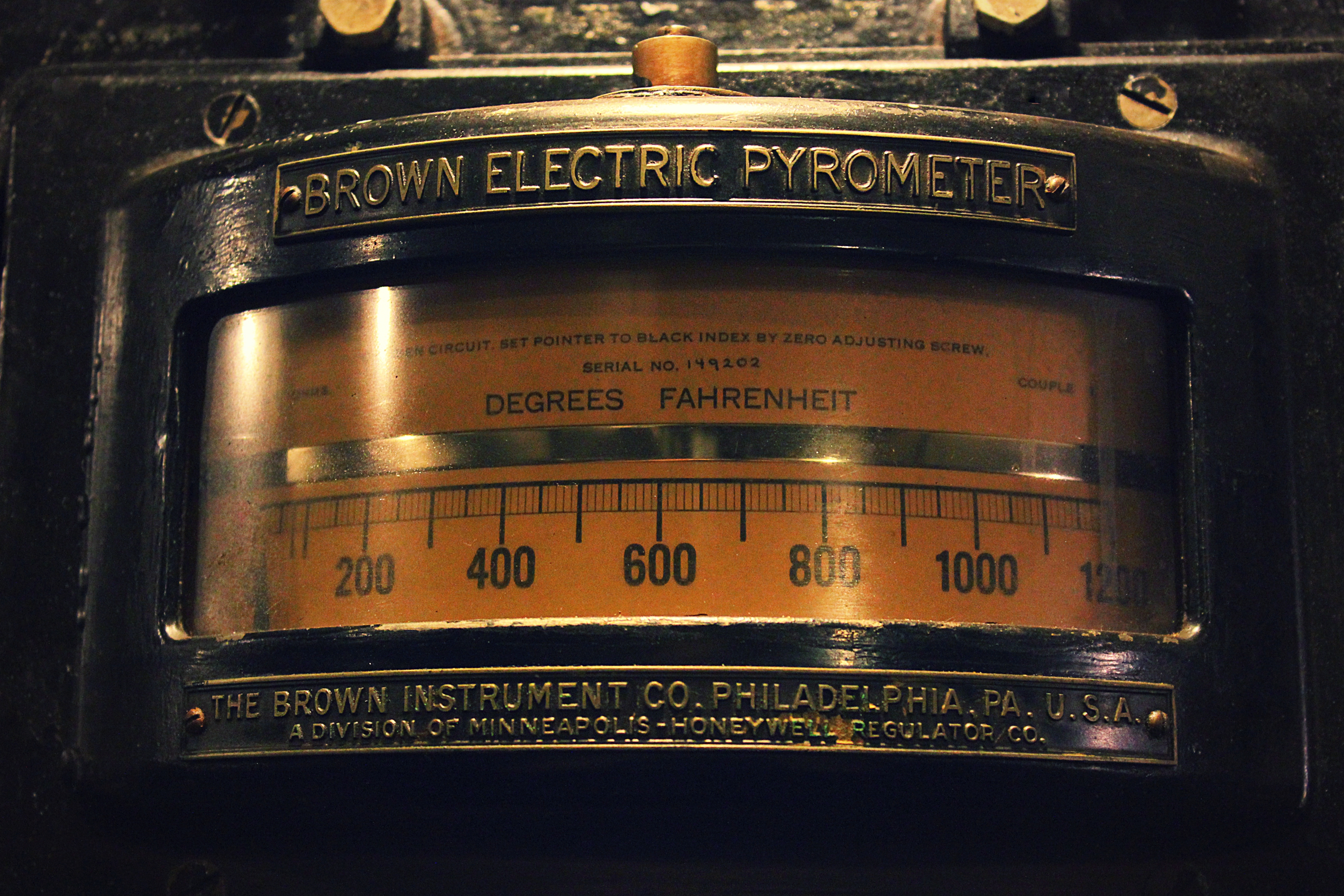
Pyrometer from Fire Fighter's Engine Room

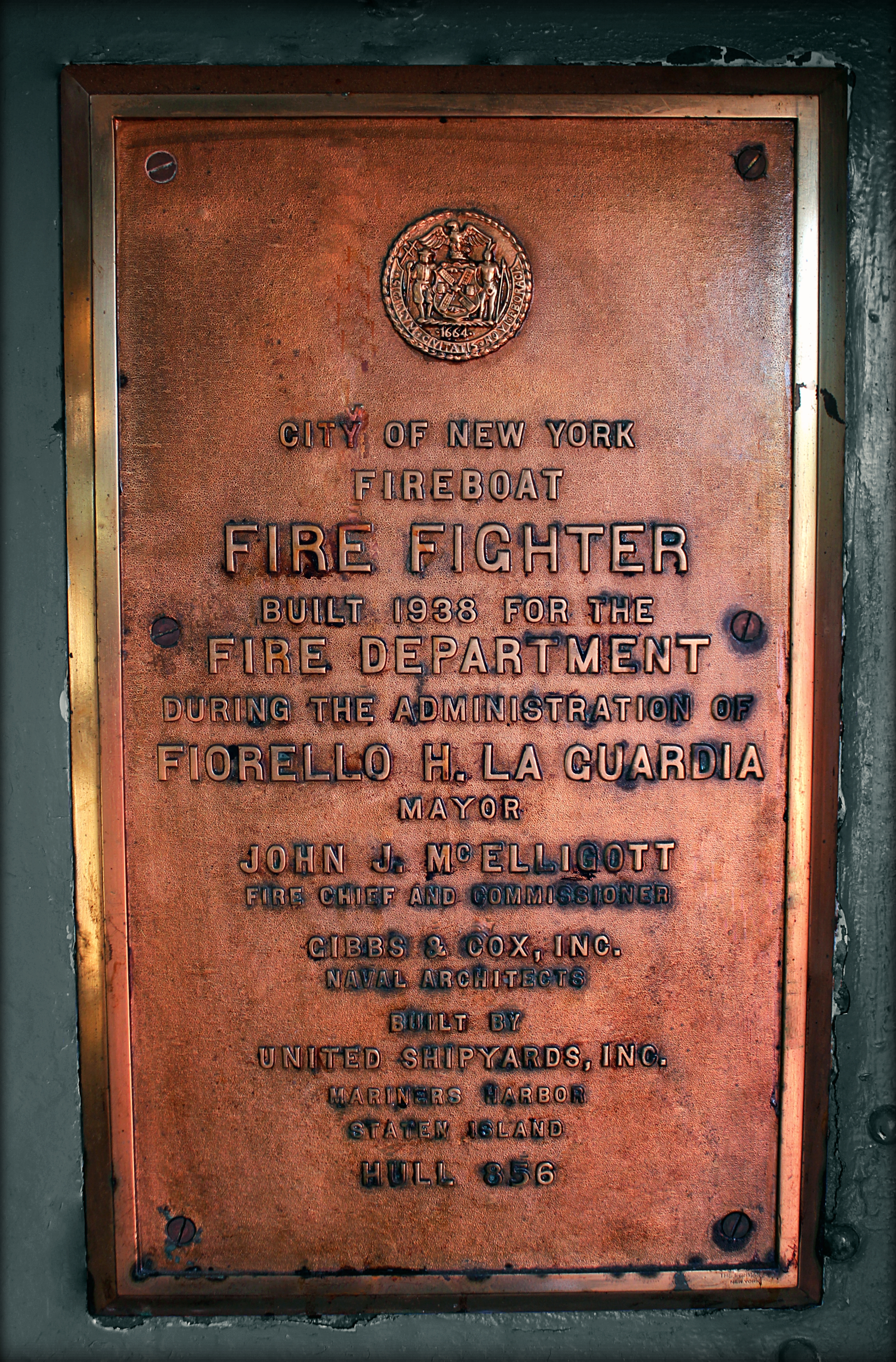
Fire Fighter's Builder's Plate

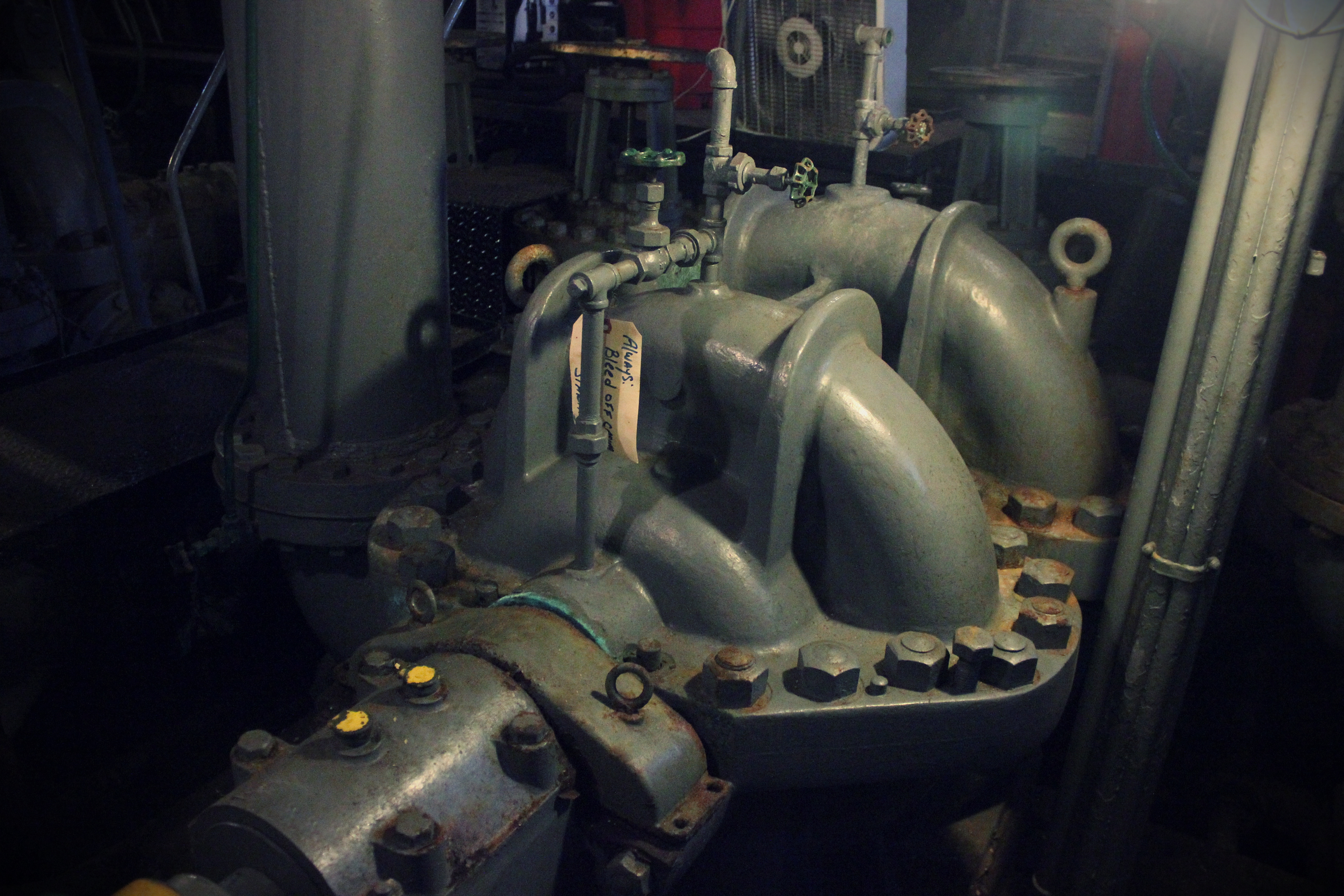
One of four 5,000gpm two-stage centrifugal DeLaval Marine Fire Pumps.

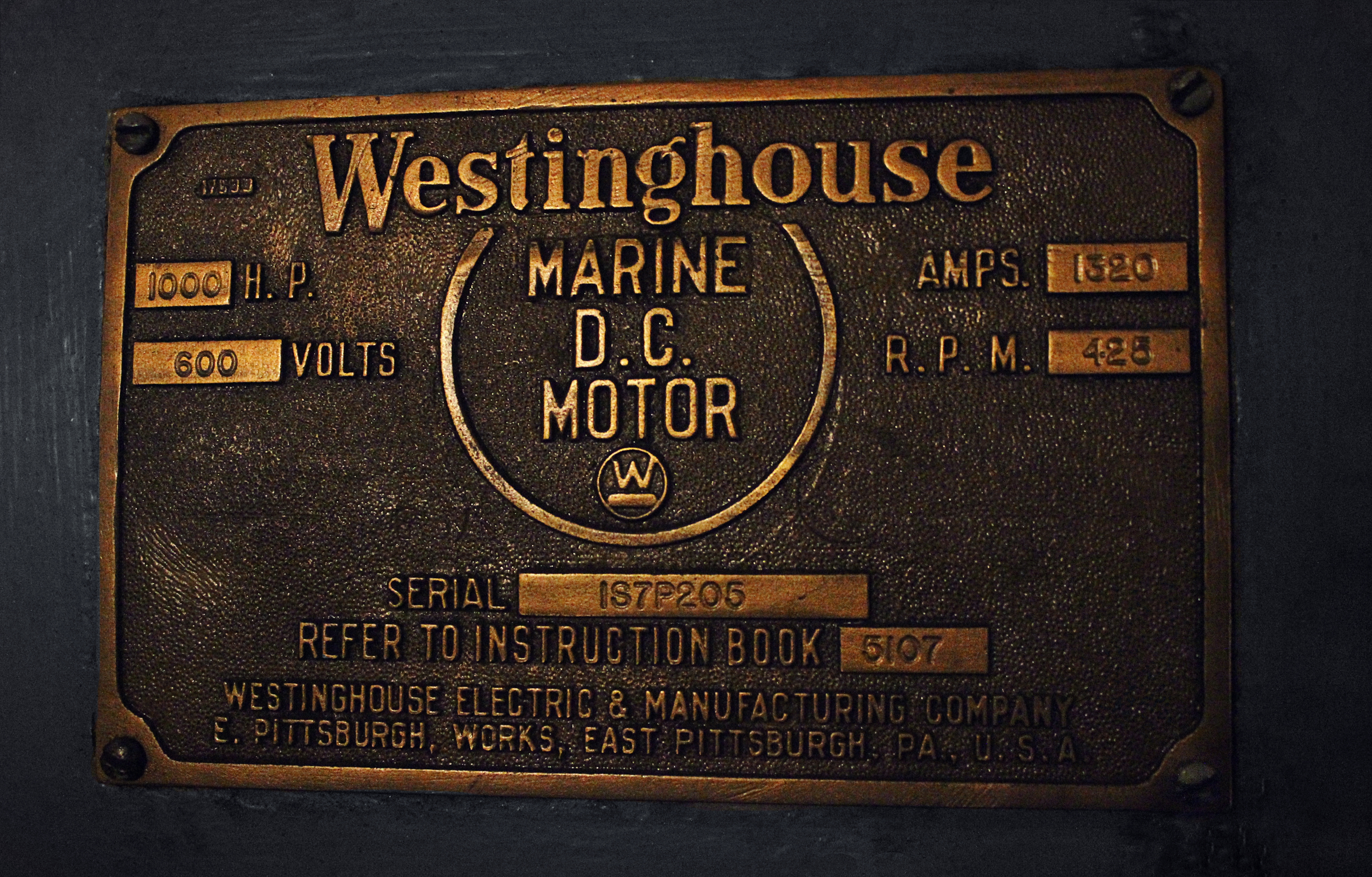
Builder's plate for one Fire Fighter's Westinghouse Electric motors

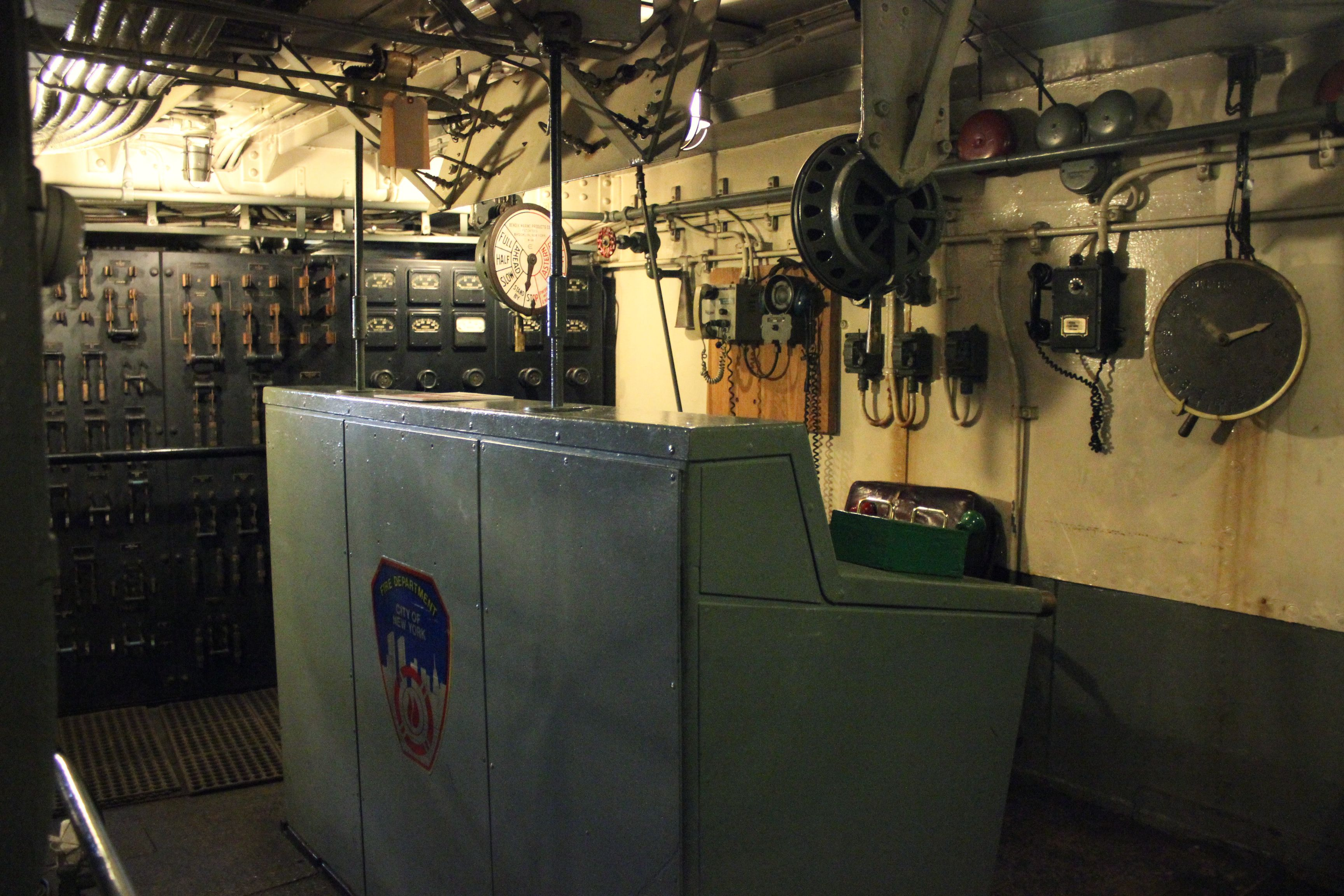
Chief Marine Engineer's control console

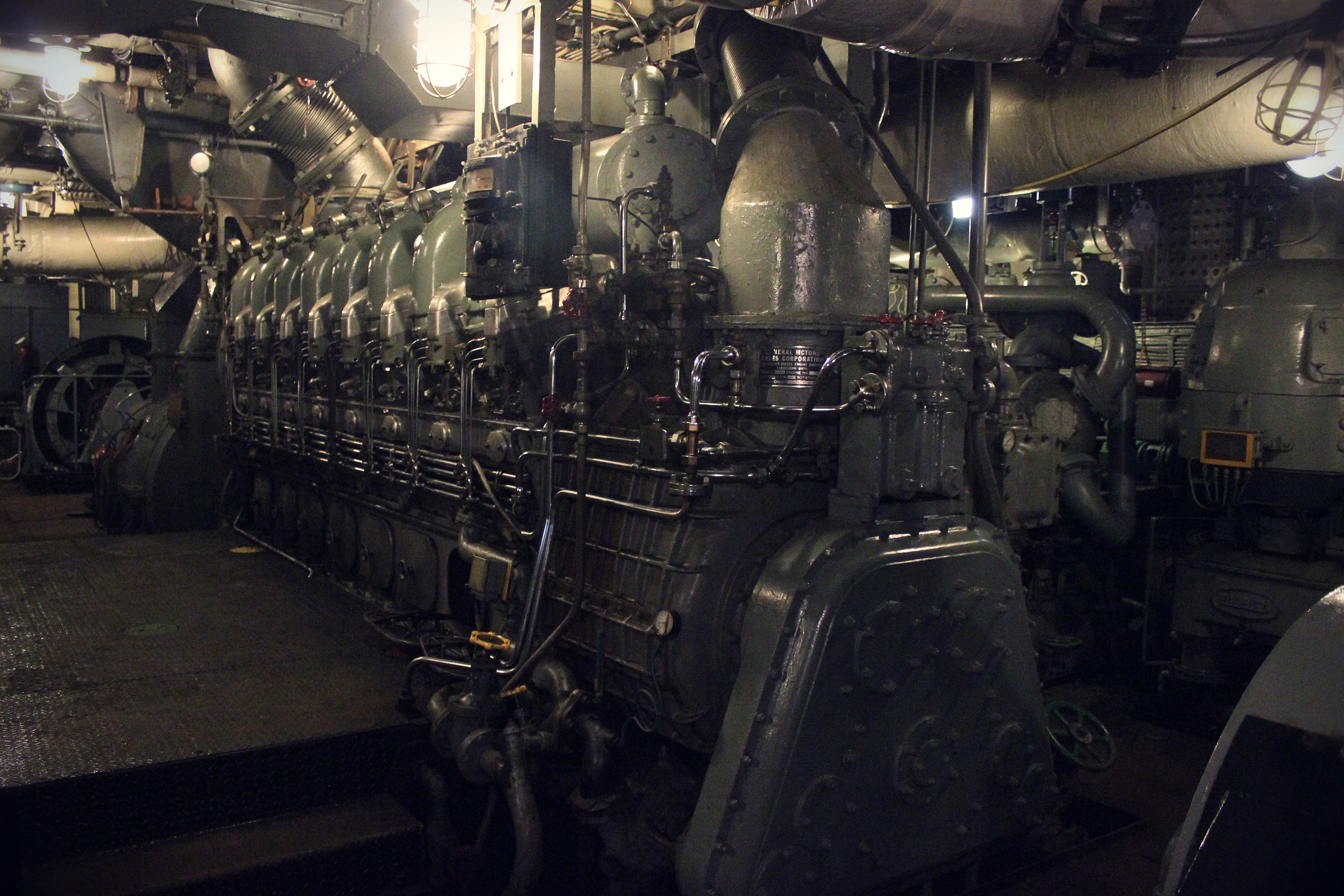
Port side 16-cylinder GM/Winton Diesel Engine

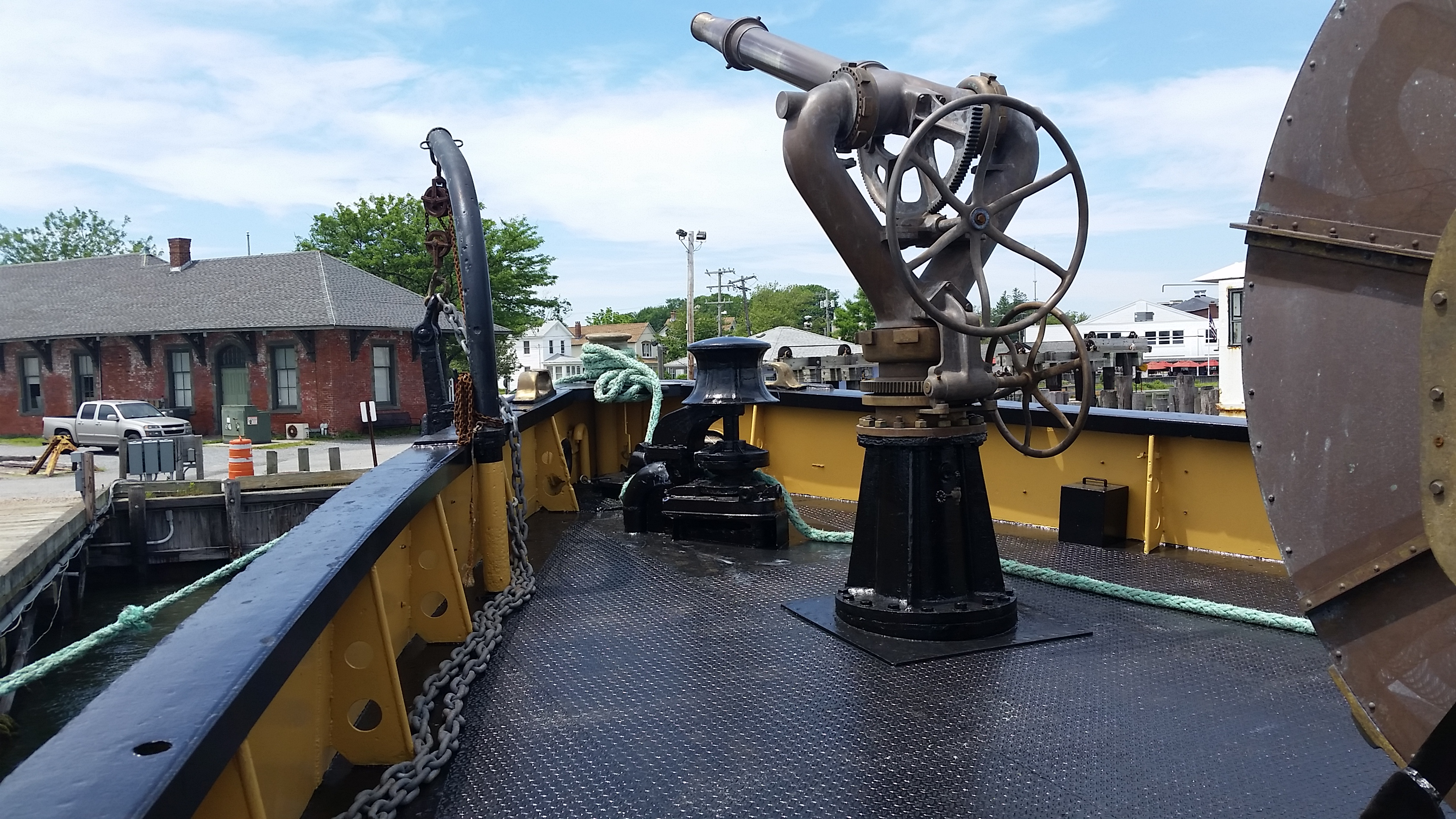

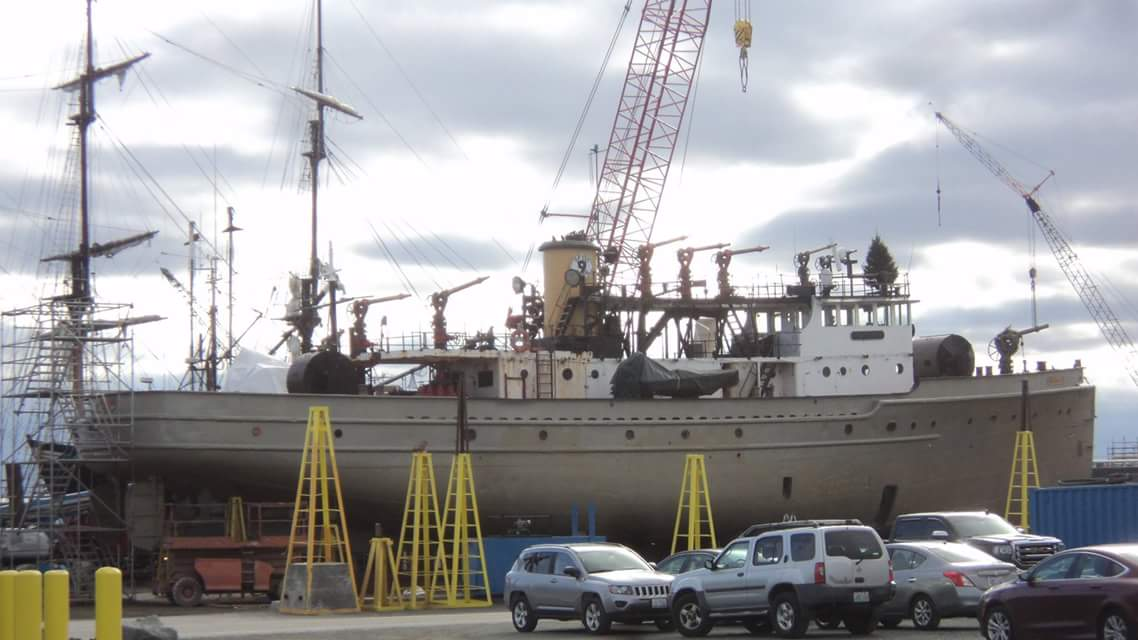

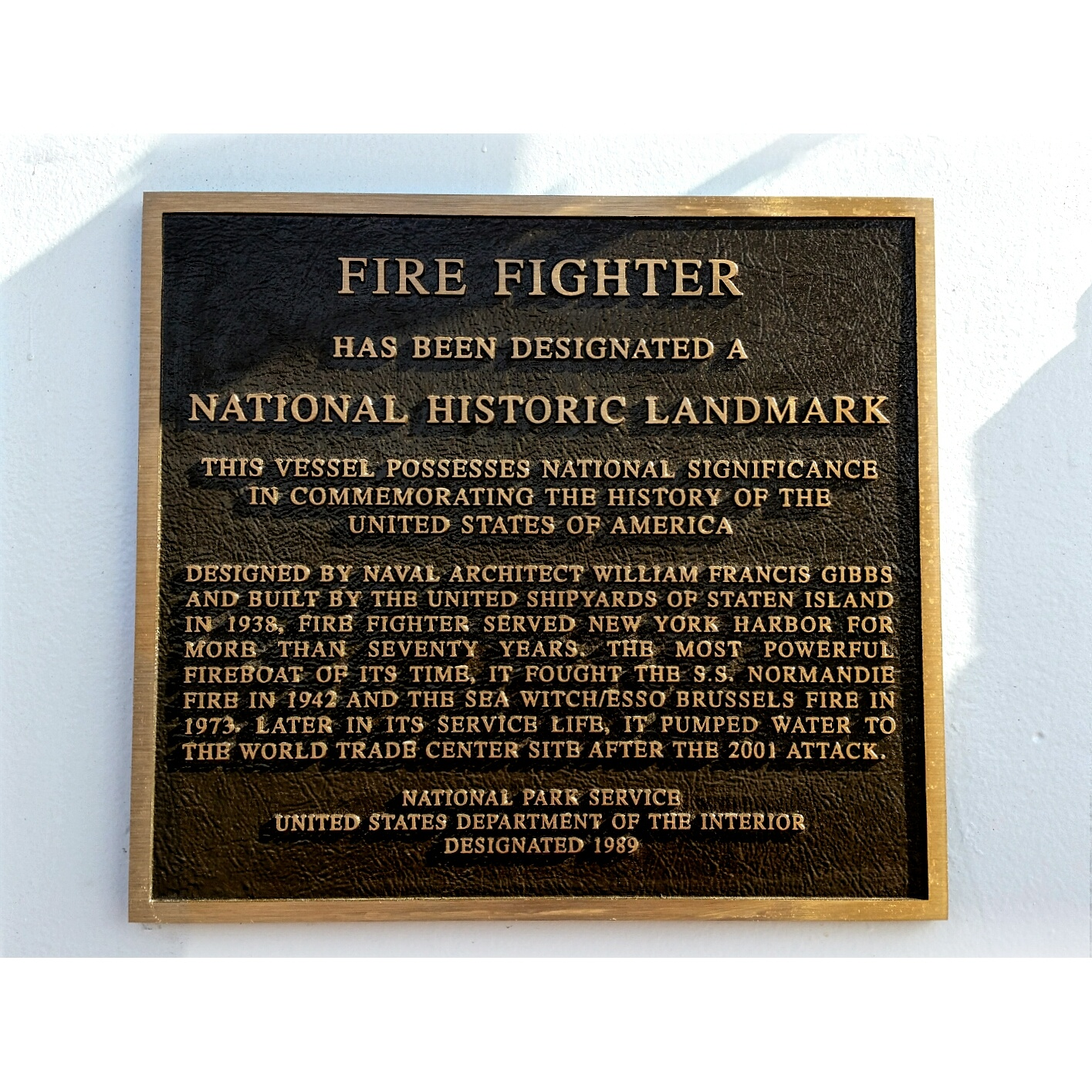

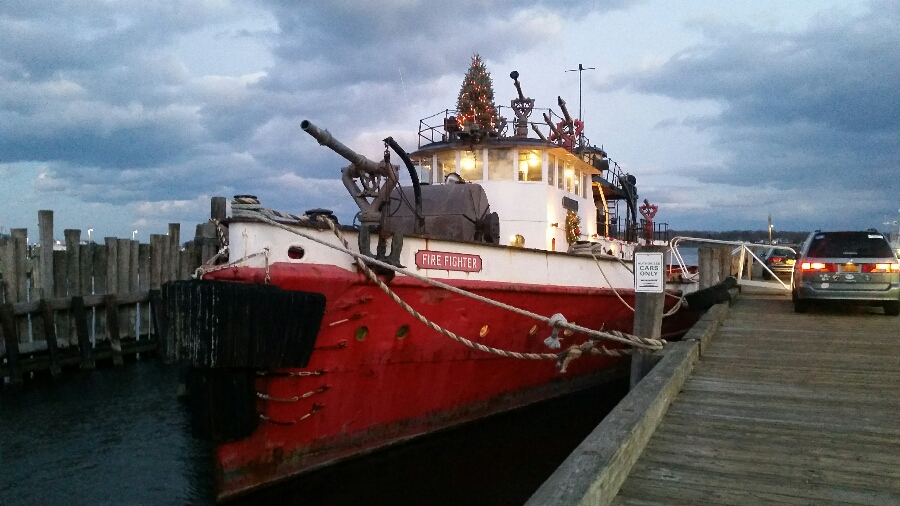

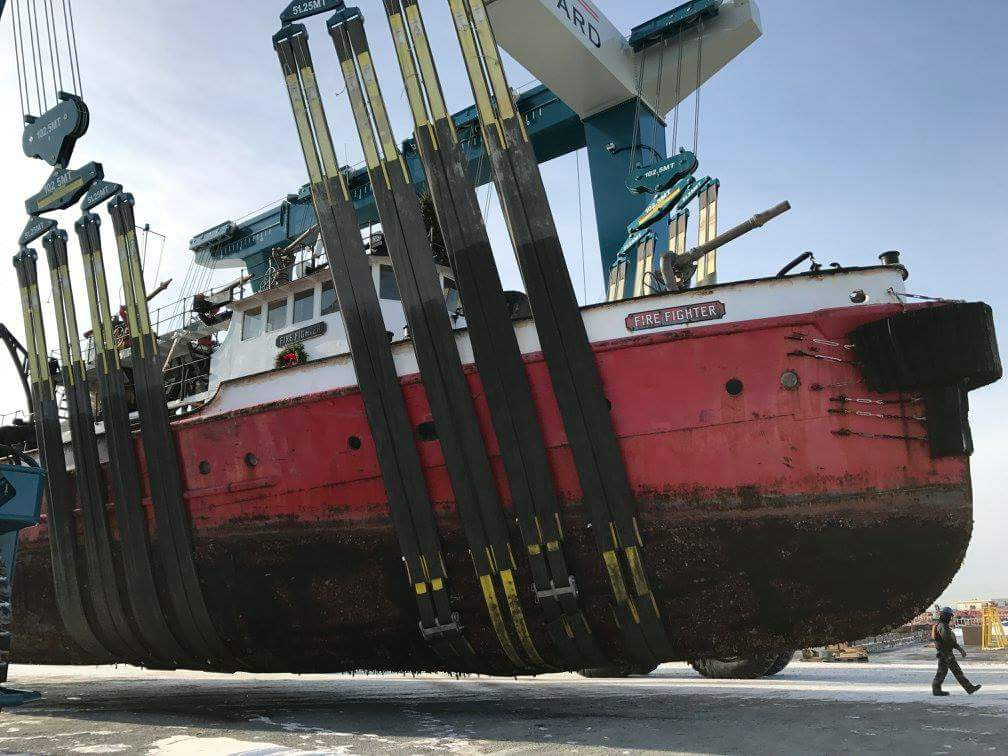
