= SS John Owen =

United States WWII Liberty Ship

History

United States
- Name: John Owen
- Namesake: John Owen
- Builder: North Carolina Shipbuilding Company, Wilmington, North Carolina
- Laid down: 15 April 1943
- Launched: 10 May 1943
- Fate: Scrapped 1964

General characteristics
- Type: Liberty ship
- Tonnage: 7,000 long tons deadweight (DWT)
- Length: 441 ft 6 in (134.57 m)
- Beam: 56 ft 11 in (17.35 m)
- Draft: 27 ft 9 in (8.46 m)
- Propulsion: Two oil-fired boilers; Triple expansion steam engine; Single screw; 2,500 hp (1,864 kW)
- Speed: 11 knots (20 km/h; 13 mph)
- Capacity: 9,140 tons cargo
- Complement: 41
- Armament: 1 × Stern-mounted 4 in (100 mm) deck gun; AA guns

SS John Owen (MC contract 1970) was a Liberty ship built in the United States during World War II. She was named after John Owen, Governor of North Carolina from 1828 to 1830.

The ship was laid down by North Carolina Shipbuilding Company in their Cape Fear River yard on April 15, 1943, and launched on May 10, 1943. Owen was chartered to the William J. Rountree Company most of World War II. First stored at the Suisun Bay Reserve Fleet, she was transferred to the Astoria Reserve Fleet in 1949. While there, Owen was part of the United States Department of Agriculture grain storage program, holding 7000 tons of grain from 1954 to 1957. It was sold for scrap in 1964.

On March 10, 1944, somewhere in the vicinity of Midway, SS John Owen's master, Robert Ogg, "drowned accidentally at sea." A certified master, A. H. Hammet, was sent to Midway to take command of the ship.
