= SS Stepas Darius =

Liberty ship built in the United States during World War II

History

United States
- Name: Stepas Darius
- Namesake: Steponas Darius
- Owner: War Shipping Administration (WSA)
- Operator: William J. Rountree Company
- Ordered: as type (EC2-S-C1) hull, MC hull 2320
- Builder: J.A. Jones Construction, Panama City, Florida
- Cost: $989,881
- Yard number: 61
- Way number: 6
- Laid down: 14 August 1944
- Launched: 25 September 1944
- Sponsored by: Mrs. Harley Ferguson
- Completed: 10 October 1944
- Identification: Call sign: WSSW
- Fate: Laid up in the National Defense Reserve Fleet, in James River Reserve Fleet, Lee Hall, Virginia, 27 June 1946; Sold for commercial use, 10 January 1947, withdrawn from fleet, 24 January 1947

Panama
- Name: MANDO
- Owner: Compania de Navegacion Phoceana de Panama
- Fate: Grounded, 21 January 1955

General characteristics
- Class & type: Liberty ship; type EC2-S-C1, standard
- Tonnage: 10,865 LT DWT; 7,176 GRT
- Displacement: 3,380 long tons (3,434 t) (light); 14,245 long tons (14,474 t) (max)
- Length: 441 feet 6 inches (135 m) oa; 416 feet (127 m) pp; 427 feet (130 m) lwl
- Beam: 57 feet (17 m)
- Draft: 27 ft 9.25 in (8.4646 m)
- Installed power: 2 × Oil fired 450 °F (232 °C) boilers, operating at 220 psi (1,500 kPa); 2,500 hp (1,900 kW)
- Propulsion: 1 × triple-expansion steam engine, (manufactured by General Machinery Corp., Hamilton, Ohio); 1 × screw propeller
- Speed: 11.5 knots (21.3 km/h; 13.2 mph)
- Capacity: 562,608 cubic feet (15,931 m^{3}) (grain); 499,573 cubic feet (14,146 m^{3}) (bale)
- Complement: 38–62 USMM; 21–40 USNAG
- Armament: Varied by ship; Bow-mounted 3-inch (76 mm)/50-caliber gun; Stern-mounted 4-inch (102 mm)/50-caliber gun; 2–8 × single 20-millimeter (0.79 in) Oerlikon anti-aircraft (AA) cannons and/or, 2–8 × 37-millimeter (1.46 in) M1 AA guns

SS Stepas Darius was a Liberty ship built in the United States during World War II. She was named after Steponas Darius, a Lithuanian American pilot, who died in a non-stop flight attempt with Lituanica from New York City to Kaunas, Lithuania, in 1933.

== Construction ==
Stepas Darius was laid down on 14 August 1944, under a Maritime Commission (MARCOM) contract, MC hull 2320, by J.A. Jones Construction, Panama City, Florida; sponsored by Mrs. Harley Ferguson, wife of assistant general manager JAJCC; and launched on 25 September 1944.

== History ==
She was allocated to William J. Rountree Company, 9 October 1944. On 27 June 1946, she was laid up in the National Defense Reserve Fleet, in James River Reserve Fleet, Lee Hall, Virginia.

She was sold, on 10 January 1947, to Compania de Navegacion Phocena de Panama, for $562,854.89 and commercial use, she was renamed Mando. She was withdrawn from the fleet on 15 January 1947.

On 21 January 1955, while sailing from Hampton Roads to Rotterdam, with 9,000 st (130,000 lb; 57,000 kg) of coal, she ran aground off the Round Island, Scilly Islands, when her engines failed. She was declared a total loss.

Wreck located at: 49.5827°N 06.2015°W

== Bibliography ==
- "Jones Construction, Panama City FL". www.ShipbuildingHistory.com. 13 October 2010.
- Maritime Administration. "Stepas Darius". Ship History Database Vessel Status Card. U.S. Department of Transportation, Maritime Administration. This article incorporates text from this source, which is in the public domain.
- Davies, James (May 2004). "Specifications (As-Built)" (PDF). p. 23.
- "SS Stepas Darius".
