= SS Augustine B. McManus =

World War II Liberty ship of the United States

History

United States
- Name: Augustine B. McManus
- Namesake: Augustine B. McManus
- Ordered: as type (EC2-S-C1) hull, MC hull 2361
- Builder: J.A. Jones Construction, Brunswick, Georgia
- Cost: $1,048,743
- Yard number: 146
- Way number: 6
- Laid down: 21 April 1944
- Launched: 10 June 1944
- Sponsored by: Mrs. William J. Harrison
- Completed: 24 June 1944
- Identification: Call Signal: WPYY
- Fate: Laid up in National Defense Reserve Fleet, Wilmington, North Carolina, 27 March 1948; Laid up in National Defense Reserve Fleet, Hudson River Group, 27 May 1952; Sold for scrapping, 30 September 1970

General characteristics
- Class & type: Liberty ship; type EC2-S-C1, standard
- Tonnage: 10,865 LT DWT; 7,176 GRT
- Displacement: 3,380 long tons (3,434 t) (light); 14,245 long tons (14,474 t) (max)
- Length: 441 feet 6 inches (135 m) oa; 416 feet (127 m) pp; 427 feet (130 m) lwl
- Beam: 57 feet (17 m)
- Draft: 27 ft 9.25 in (8.4646 m)
- Installed power: 2 × Oil fired 450 °F (232 °C) boilers, operating at 220 psi (1,500 kPa); 2,500 hp (1,900 kW)
- Propulsion: 1 × triple-expansion steam engine, (manufactured by National Transit Company, Oil City, Pennsylvania); 1 × screw propeller
- Speed: 11.5 knots (21.3 km/h; 13.2 mph)
- Capacity: 562,608 cubic feet (15,931 m^{3}) (grain); 499,573 cubic feet (14,146 m^{3}) (bale)
- Complement: 38–62 USMM; 21–40 USNAG
- Armament: Varied by ship; Bow-mounted 3-inch (76 mm)/50-caliber gun; Stern-mounted 4-inch (102 mm)/50-caliber gun; 2–8 × single 20-millimeter (0.79 in) Oerlikon anti-aircraft (AA) cannons and/or, 2–8 × 37-millimeter (1.46 in) M1 AA guns

SS Augustine B. McManus was a Liberty ship built in the United States during World War II. She was named after Augustine B. McManus, a US Navy officer and a Navy Hydrographic Bureau scientist that had testified at the Titanic disaster trials.

== Construction ==
Augustine B. McManus was laid down on 21 April 1944, under a Maritime Commission (MARCOM) contract, MC hull 2361, by J.A. Jones Construction, Brunswick, Georgia; she was sponsored by Mrs. William J. Harrison, and launched on 10 June 1944.

== History ==
She was allocated to William J. Rountree Company, on 24 June 1944. On 17 December 1945, she was laid up in the National Defense Reserve Fleet in Wilmington, North Carolina. On 27 May 1952, she was laid up in the National Defense Reserve Fleet in the Hudson River Group. On 4 June 1953, she was withdrawn from the fleet to be loaded with grain under the "Grain Program 1953", she returned loaded with grain on 17 June 1953. She was again withdrawn from the fleet on 27 April 1956, to have the grain unloaded, she returned reloaded on 22 May 1956. She was withdrawn from the fleet on 23 May 1963, to have the grain unloaded, she returned empty on 28 May 1963. On 30 September 1970, she was sold to Union Mineral & Alloys Corporation, along with three other ships, for $160,646.16, for scrapping. She was delivered on 18 November 1970.

== Bibliography ==
- "Jones Construction, Brunswick GA". www.ShipbuildingHistory.com. 13 October 2010.
- "Liberty Ships – World War II".
- Maritime Administration. "Augustine B. McManus". Ship History Database Vessel Status Card. U.S. Department of Transportation, Maritime Administration. Archived from the original on 12 December 2019.
- Davies, James (May 2004). "Specifications (As-Built)" (PDF). p. 23.
- "SS Augustine B. McManus".
