= SS Niels Poulson =

World War II Liberty ship of the United States

History

United States
- Name: Niels Poulson
- Namesake: Niels Poulson
- Ordered: as type (EC2-S-C1) hull, MC hull 2371
- Builder: J.A. Jones Construction, Brunswick, Georgia
- Cost: $972,154
- Yard number: 156
- Way number: 4
- Laid down: 6 July 1944
- Launched: 18 August 1944
- Sponsored by: Mrs. W.H. McWhirter
- Completed: 5 September 1944
- Identification: Call Signal: WSLR
- Fate: Struck a mine off Gorgona, Italy, 6 December 1946; Sold for scrapping, 20 February 1948

General characteristics
- Class & type: Liberty ship; type EC2-S-C1, standard
- Tonnage: 10,865 LT DWT; 7,176 GRT
- Displacement: 3,380 long tons (3,434 t) (light); 14,245 long tons (14,474 t) (max)
- Length: 441 feet 6 inches (135 m) oa; 416 feet (127 m) pp; 427 feet (130 m) lwl
- Beam: 57 feet (17 m)
- Draft: 27 ft 9.25 in (8.4646 m)
- Installed power: 2 × Oil fired 450 °F (232 °C) boilers, operating at 220 psi (1,500 kPa); 2,500 hp (1,900 kW)
- Propulsion: 1 × triple-expansion steam engine, (manufactured by General Machinery Corp., Hamilton, Ohio); 1 × screw propeller
- Speed: 11.5 knots (21.3 km/h; 13.2 mph)
- Capacity: 562,608 cubic feet (15,931 m^{3}) (grain); 499,573 cubic feet (14,146 m^{3}) (bale)
- Complement: 38–62 USMM; 21–40 USNAG
- Armament: Varied by ship; Bow-mounted 3-inch (76 mm)/50-caliber gun; Stern-mounted 4-inch (102 mm)/50-caliber gun; 2–8 × single 20-millimeter (0.79 in) Oerlikon anti-aircraft (AA) cannons and/or, 2–8 × 37-millimeter (1.46 in) M1 AA guns

SS Niels Poulson was a Liberty ship built in the United States during World War II. She was named after Niels Poulson, an architect and philanthropist.

== Construction ==
Niels Poulson was laid down on 6 July 1944, under a United States Maritime Commission (MARCOM) contract, MC hull 2371, by J.A. Jones Construction, Brunswick, Georgia; she was sponsored by Mrs. W.H. McWhirter, and launched on 18 August 1944.

== History ==
She was allocated to the Dichmann Wright & Pugh Company, on 5 September 1944. On 6 December 1946, she struck a mine off Gorgona, Italy, and was towed to Leghorn, Italy, where she was declared a constructive total loss (CTL) on 19 December. On 20 February 1948, she was sold, along with 39 other vessels, including her sister ships SS Isaac Shelby and SS Cassius Hudson, for $520,000, to Venturi Salvaggi Ricuperi Imprese Marittime Societa per Azioni, Genoa.

== Bibliography ==
- "Jones Construction, Brunswick GA". ShipbuildingHistory.com. 13 October 2010.
- "Liberty Ships – World War II".
- Maritime Administration. "Niels Poulson". Ship History Database Vessel Status Card. U.S. Department of Transportation, Maritime Administration. Archived from the original on 12 December 2019.
- Davies, James (May 2004). "Specifications (As-Built)" (PDF). p. 23.
- "SS Niels Poulson".
