= SS Esso Brussels =

Ship built in 1960

History

Belgium
- Name: Esso Brussels (1959–73); Petrola XVII (1973–74); Spiro (1974–75); Petrola XXXVI (1976–83); Petrola 36 (1983–85)
- Owner: Esso Marine (Belgium) SA (1959–73); Iphigenia Shipping & Trading Co (1973–75); John D Latsis (1975–76); Iphigenia Shipping & Trading Co (1976–85)
- Operator: Esso Marine (Belgium) SA (1959–73); John D Latsis (1973–83); Bilinder Marine Corp (1983–85)
- Builder: Kockums shipyard FH, Malmö, Sweden
- Laid down: 4 May 1959
- Launched: 26 October 1959
- In service: 1960
- Out of service: 21 October 1985
- Home port: (Belgium) Antwerp (1959–73); (Greece) Piraeus (1973–85)
- Identification: IMO number: 5107035
- Fate: Scrapped at Aliağa, Turkey 1985

General characteristics
- Type: Oil Tanker
- Tonnage: 16,422 NRT; 43,964 DWT
- Length: 213.12 m (699 ft 3 in)
- Beam: 29.65 m (97 ft 3 in)
- Height: 11.59 m (38 ft 0 in)
- Installed power: Two steam turbines (12,309 kilowatts (16,507 hp)), double reduction geared.
- Propulsion: Single screw
- Speed: 17.25 knots (31.95 km/h)
- Crew: 52

Esso Brussels was a commercial oil tanker built for the Esso Oil company in 1959. She was involved in a collision in 1973 in which thirteen of her crew perished. She was rebuilt and sailed under various other names until being scrapped in 1985.

== Construction and service ==
She was built at Kockums shipyard in Malmö, Sweden and launched on 26 October 1959. Following outfitting, she entered commercial service transporting crude and refined oil products for the Esso Oil Company throughout Europe, Africa, and North America. Built along classic lines with the bridge and the officer's quarters located amidships and the engines, crew quarters and aft deckhouse located toward the stern, Esso Brussels was a typical oil tanker in both size and design for her time.

== Collision with the container vessel Sea Witch ==
The Esso Brussels dropped anchor in the southernmost anchorage of The Narrows in New York Harbor on June 1, 1973, fully loaded with 319,402 barrels (50,780.9 m^{3}) of light Nigerian crude oil destined for Exxon's Bayway Refinery. While she waited for the high tide, her mixed European crew of 36 men and one woman, first steward Gisele Rome, under the command of Captain Constant Dert went about their daily routine into the evening of the 1st. When the 12 a.m. to 4 a.m. watch came on duty all seemed normal.

At roughly the same time, the container ship Sea Witch left the Howland Hook Marine Terminal on Staten Island. She headed for the sea, carrying some 730 containers on board. Twenty-nine minutes after midnight, the Sea Witch passed the ferry terminal at the tip of St. George, Staten Island, and turned to a heading of 167 degrees in order to begin transiting the Narrows separating Staten Island from Brooklyn. Seven minutes later the Sandy Hook pilot Jack Cahill ordered a change in course to 156 degrees so the ship would pass through the shipping lane in the general anchorage. The second turn never occurred. When the ship did not respond as expected, the helmsman told the Captain that Sea Witch was no longer steering. Both the captain's and the pilot's attempts to re-engage the steering gear and check the Sea Witch's continuing turn to starboard proved futile.

With all steering control was lost and the ship proceeding at 15 knots with the aid of an outbound tide the Sea Witch was being forced out of the channel toward Staten Island. The Pilot immediately ordered the engines to full astern and the port anchor to be let go in an effort to stop the ship. Blowing a series of short rapid blasts on the ship's whistle signaling that Sea Witch was in distress and ordering the general alarm bell rung to alert the crew, both the pilot and the captain watched as both of her anchors failed to deploy. A mere two and a half minutes after control was lost on board Sea Witch she was a mere 200 feet (61 m) from the starboard side of the Esso Brussels and realizing that the ship was not going to be able to stop in time, the Sea Witch's whistle was locked to sound continuously and her crew abandoned the forward section of the ship.

The mate standing what was a quiet and uneventful watch on Esso Brussels's bridge heard Sea Witch's distress whistle and watched as the container ship began to head out of the channel towards his ship. First thinking that the disabled ship would pass astern of his tanker, the Mate sounded the general alarm as the Sea Witch continued to veer in his direction. With only about two minutes of warning, many of the crew of the Esso Brussels were still below decks when the collision occurred.

Making about 13 knots and her engines in full reverse, Sea Witch rammed its ice-reinforced bow into the starboard side of the Esso Brussels between the midship and aft deckhouses, piercing three of the Esso Brussels' cargo tanks and locking the two ships together. The light crude oil spewed out of the punctured tanks and its vapors quickly caught fire wreathing both ships in a pool of burning oil. Despite the sudden chaos on the Esso Brussels Capt. Dert supervised the terrified crew as they abandoned the burning ship onto the only available lifeboat. Having lowered the motorized aft port lifeboat the crew tried to release it from its lines and get its engine started, but the hand crank to start the engine was impossible to operate on the overloaded lifeboat once freed from the ship.

Despite the resistance from the anchors of the Esso Brussels, the engines of Sea Witch, still running full reverse, were pulling both ships down the Narrows. This movement created a suction force which pinned the Esso Brussel's lifeboat against the tanker's hull and brought the pool of flaming oil around to the port side of the ship. A last-second attempt to row the lifeboat away from the advancing fire failed to overpower the suction, and as the flames grew nearer to the lifeboat, many of the crew jumped into the water in a desperate attempt to escape the flames.

Within minutes of the collision the veteran FDNY fireboat Fire Fighter arrived to what the firefighters aboard would later describe as a sea of flames that extended 3,000 yards in front of them. Thinking there had been an explosion on the Esso Brussels, the fireboat began to pour water onto the ship from its starboard bow, keeping their ship upwind and upcurrent from the smoke and flames now heading towards the Verrazzano–Narrows Bridge. As the two ships passed beneath the bridge, the pool of burning oil surrounding the ships sent flames high enough to scorch the bottom of the bridge 228 feet (69 m) above the water's surface. Fortunately, the anchor chains on the Esso Brussels parted at this point and both ships passed under the bridge quickly, preventing the steel from suffering heat damage.

Propelled by the Sea Witch's still-running engines and the outbound tide, the ships proceeded into outer New York Harbor and ran aground in Gravesend Bay, burning furiously. After both ships grounded, Fire Fighter moved into position and fought the oil fire from the port side of Esso Brussels. To their horror, as they extinguished the fire they saw the bow of Sea Witch was embedded in the starboard side and realized that two vessels were involved in the inferno. Moving quickly along the port side of the container ship they began to pour water on the blazing container stack of the Sea Witch and moved toward its stern, hoping to find some evidence of the ship's crew, 30 of whom were rescued from the stern of the ship.

At dawn on June 2, 1973, the fires from the oil cargo on board the Esso Brussels were mostly under control, aided by her sound construction which prevented the oil in her undamaged tanks from leaking out or catching fire. Sea Witch was in much worse condition, as almost all the on-deck containers were still burning. The US Coast Guard and FDNY agreed to have tugs separate the vessels to avoid the risk of the rest of the oil aboard the Esso Brussels catching fire. Once separated, the four FDNY fireboats easily extinguished what little oil continued to burn and the hulk of the Esso Brussels was towed to the Military Ocean Terminal at Bayonne to have the balance of her oil cargo removed onto barges for delivery.

By this time, tugs and small craft managed to rescue the Esso Brussels survivors from the water, but 13 of her crew were lost and never seen again, including Captain Dert. Two members of the Sea Witch's crew were lost below decks, unable to escape the fire and heat.

== Later life ==
In the months following the collision the severely damaged Esso Brussels remained at the Military Ocean Terminal until November 1973, when she was purchased by Iphigenia Shipping & Trading Co, Piraeus, Greece. Esso Brussels was towed to Piraeus to be rebuilt. Emerging from the shipyard in 1973, the newly named Petrola XVII was placed under the management of John D Latsis. In 1974, she was renamed Spiro, then Petrola XXXVI in 1975, when she was sold to Latsis. In 1976, she was sold back to Iphigenia Shipping & Trading and was renamed Petrola 36. In 1983, management was transferred to Bilinder Marine Corp. Petrola 36 served until 1985, arriving on 21 October at Aliağa, Turkey for scrapping.
