= SS Isaac Shelby =

World War II Liberty ship of the United States

History

United States
- Name: Isaac Shelby
- Namesake: Isaac Shelby
- Ordered: as type (EC2-S-C1) hull, MC hull 1518
- Builder: J.A. Jones Construction, Brunswick, Georgia
- Cost: $1,097,546
- Yard number: 134
- Way number: 6
- Laid down: 22 January 1944
- Launched: 6 March 1944
- Sponsored by: Mrs. K.D. Nichols
- Completed: 18 March 1944
- Identification: Call Signal: KWAE
- Fate: Struck a mine and sunk off Italy, 5 January 1945; Sold for scrapping, 20 February 1948

General characteristics
- Class & type: Liberty ship; type EC2-S-C1, standard
- Tonnage: 10,865 LT DWT; 7,176 GRT
- Displacement: 3,380 long tons (3,434 t) (light); 14,245 long tons (14,474 t) (max)
- Length: 441 feet 6 inches (135 m) oa; 416 feet (127 m) pp; 427 feet (130 m) lwl
- Beam: 57 feet (17 m)
- Draft: 27 ft 9.25 in (8.4646 m)
- Installed power: 2 × Oil fired 450 °F (232 °C) boilers, operating at 220 psi (1,500 kPa); 2,500 hp (1,900 kW)
- Propulsion: 1 × triple-expansion steam engine, (manufactured by Filer and Stowell, Milwaukee, Wisconsin); 1 × screw propeller
- Speed: 11.5 knots (21.3 km/h; 13.2 mph)
- Capacity: 562,608 cubic feet (15,931 m^{3}) (grain); 499,573 cubic feet (14,146 m^{3}) (bale)
- Complement: 38–62 USMM; 21–40 USNAG
- Armament: Varied by ship; Bow-mounted 3-inch (76 mm)/50-caliber gun; Stern-mounted 4-inch (102 mm)/50-caliber gun; 2–8 × single 20-millimeter (0.79 in) Oerlikon anti-aircraft (AA) cannons and/or, 2–8 × 37-millimeter (1.46 in) M1 AA guns

SS Isaac Shelby was a Liberty ship built in the United States during World War II. She was named after Isaac Shelby, the first and fifth Governor of Kentucky.

== Construction ==
Isaac Shelby was laid down on 22 January 1944, under a United States Maritime Commission (MARCOM) contract, MC hull 1518, by J.A. Jones Construction, Brunswick, Georgia; she was sponsored by Mrs. K.D. Nichols, and launched on 6 March 1944.

== History ==
She was allocated to the Smith & Johnson Company, on 18 March 1944. On 5 January 1945, she struck a mine off Naples, Italy, 41°12′N 13°30′E. She broke in two and sank with no loss of life. On 20 February 1948, she was sold, along with 39 other vessels, including her sister ship SS Niels Poulson, for $520,000, to Venturi Salvaggi Ricuperi Imprese Marittime Societa per Azioni, Genoa.

== Bibliography ==
- "Jones Construction, Brunswick GA". ShipbuildingHistory.com. 13 October 2010.
- "Liberty Ships – World War II".
- Maritime Administration. "Isaac Shelby". Ship History Database Vessel Status Card. U.S. Department of Transportation, Maritime Administration. Archived from the original on 12 December 2019.
- Davies, James (May 2004). "Specifications (As-Built)" (PDF). p. 23.
- "SS Isaac Shelby".
