= Housatonic =

Housatonic may refer to:

== Place names in the United States ==
- Housatonic, Massachusetts, a census-designated place in the town of Great Barrington
- Housatonic River, a river in western Massachusetts and western Connecticut, and the source for other uses of the word
- Housatonic Valley, the valley and watershed of the Housatonic River

== Schools ==
- Housatonic Community College, in Bridgeport, Connecticut
- Housatonic Valley Regional High School, Falls Village, Connecticut

== Transport ==
- Housatonic Railroad, a railroad that operated independently 1836–1892, as a subsidiary 1892–1970s, and a separate company started in 1983 in western Connecticut
- SS Georgia (1890), a German passenger liner seized by the United States during World War I, renamed Housatonic, and sunk by a German submarine
- USS Housatonic, any of three United States Navy vessels, including the first ship to be sunk by a submarine

== Other uses ==
- Housatonic, a dialect of the Unami language
- Housatonic (a.k.a. Housatannuck), reference to the Stockbridge Indians
- Housatonic, an American nuclear weapon test of the Operation Dominic I and II series
