= SS Housatonic =

A number of ships were named Housatonic, including:

- SS Housatonic (1890), an American cargo ship torpedoed and sunk in 1917
- SS Housatonic (1893), a British tanker wrecked in 1908
- SS Housatonic (1919), a British tanker sunk by aircraft bombing in 1941

== See also ==
- USS Housatonic, several United States Navy vessels
