= SS Vigilancia =

US steamship sunk in the First World War

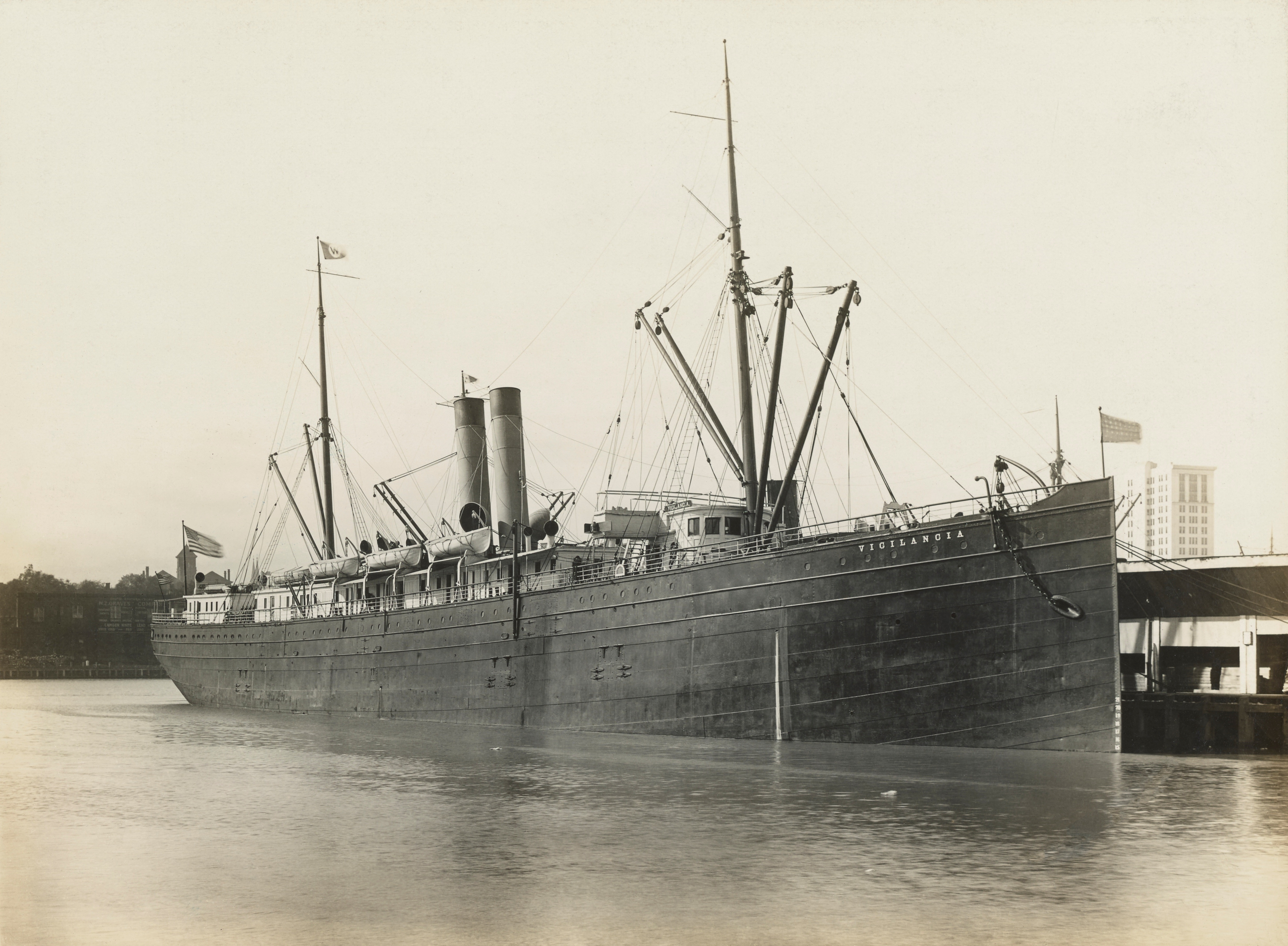
- Vigilancia in Ward Line colors

History

United States
- Name: Vigilancia
- Namesake: Spanish for "vigilance"
- Owner: 1890: US & Brazil SS Co; 1893: Ludlow & Co; 1894: New York & Cuba Mail SS Co; 1915: Walker, Armstrong & Co; 1916: Gaston, Williams & Wigmore
- Operator: 1894: Ward Line
- Port of registry: 1890: New York; 1915: Savannah; 1916: Wilmington
- Route: 1891: New York – Río de la Plata; 1894: New York – Tampico; 1896: New York – Vera Cruz; 1911: New York – Tampico
- Builder: Delaware River Co, Chester, PA
- Cost: between $400,000 and $450,000
- Yard number: 259
- Launched: 17 September 1890
- Completed: 1890
- Identification: US official number 161643; code letters KHSN; by 1914: call sign KWV
- Fate: sunk by torpedo, 1917

General characteristics
- Type: 1890: ocean liner; 1915: cargo ship
- Tonnage: 4,115 GRT, 2,934 NRT
- Length: 321.3 ft (97.9 m)
- Beam: 45.3 ft (13.8 m)
- Depth: 27.3 ft (8.3 m)
- Decks: 3
- Installed power: 339 NHP; 2,900 ihp
- Propulsion: 1 × triple-expansion engine; 1 × screw
- Sail plan: barquentine
- Speed: 13.89 knots (25.7 km/h) maximum
- Capacity: passengers: 118 × 1st class; 42 × steerage; cargo: by 1914 included 2,500 cubic feet (71 m^{3}) refrigerated
- Troops: 1898: 45 officers + 800 enlisted
- Crew: 1909: 87; 1917: 43
- Notes: sister ship: Seguranca

SS Vigilancia was a merchant steamship that was built in Pennsylvania in 1890. It sailed between New York and Brazil via the West Indies until 1893, when its original owners went bankrupt. The New York and Cuba Mail Steamship Company, commonly known as Ward Line, owned her from 1894 until 1914, and ran it between New York and Mexico via Cuba. In 1898 it was a troopship in the Spanish–American War.

Vigilancia was a passenger and cargo ship until 1915, when it was bought by a company in Georgia to export US cotton to Germany. In 1916 it was bought by a new company that exported US trucks to the Entente Powers. In March 1917 a U-boat sank it in the North Atlantic, killing 15 of its crew, including six US citizens. This is one of several German attacks on US merchant ships that helped to provoke the US to declare war on Germany.

== Building ==
In 1890 the Delaware River Iron Ship Building and Engine Works of Chester, Pennsylvania built a pair of sister ships for the United States and Brazil Steam Ship Company. They were named Seguranca and Vigilancia, meaning "Security" and "Vigilance". Vigilancia was said to have cost between $400,000 and $450,000.

Vigilancia was built as yard number 259 and launched on 17 September 1890. She was of mixed iron and steel construction. Her registered length was 321.3 ft (97.9 m), her beam was 45.3 ft (13.8 m), and her depth was 27.3 ft (8.3 m). Her tonnages were 4,115 GRT and 2,934 NRT. As built, she had berths for 160 passengers: 118 in first class, and 42 in steerage.

She had a single screw, driven by a three-cylinder triple-expansion engine that was rated at 339 NHP or 2,900 ihp. She had two funnels, two masts, and was rigged as a barquentine.

== United States – Brazil service ==
The US and Brazil SS Co registered Vigilancia in New York. Her US official number was 161643 and her code letters were KHSN. By December 1891 her route was between New York and Río de la Plata via St Thomas in the Danish West Indies; Barbados; and ports in Brazil. By 1892 the US and Brazil SS Co was offering fortnightly sailings between New York and Brazil, and Vigilancia's ports of call included Santos; Montevideo; Buenos Aires, and Rosario. By 1893 she also served Martinique.

In December 1892 Vigilancia passed a trial for a contract to carry mail between the US and Brazil. The contract required her to maintain 12 knots (22 km/h). She achieved 13.89 knots (25.7 km/h) with 1,500 tons of cargo in her holds.

=== Bankruptcy, seizure and sale ===
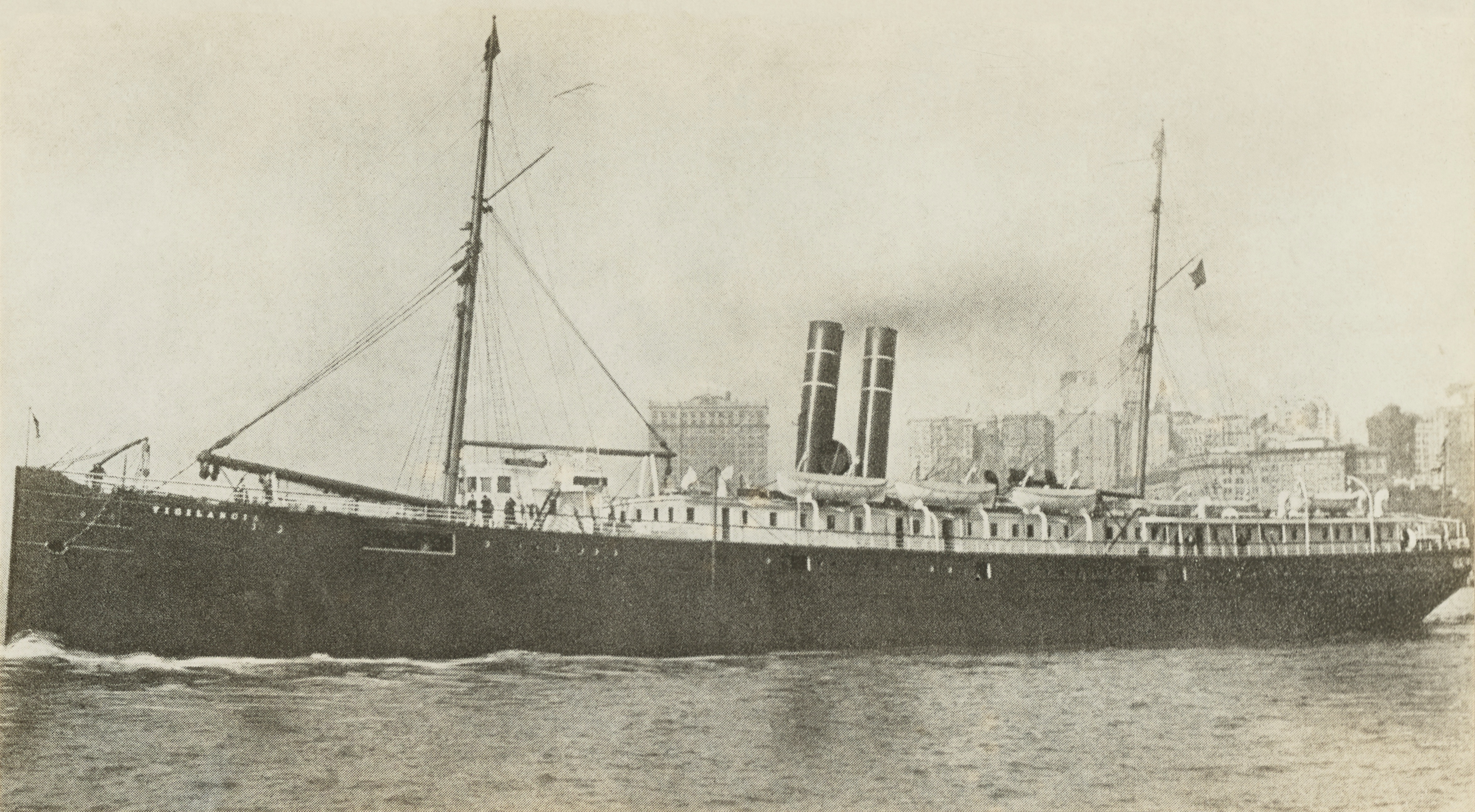
Vigilancia under way

In April 1893 the US and Brazil SS Co went bankrupt, and its five ships were seized in lieu of debts to suppliers and unpaid wages to crew. EH Ludlow and Company bought four of them at auction, including Vigilancia for $81,000 and Seguranca for $125,000.

On 1 November 1893 it was reported that the Brazilian Government had bought ten US merchant ships to convert into auxiliary cruisers to fight against the Revolta da Armada. They included Seguranca, Vigilancia, and three other former US and Brazil SS Co steamships.

== Ward Line ==
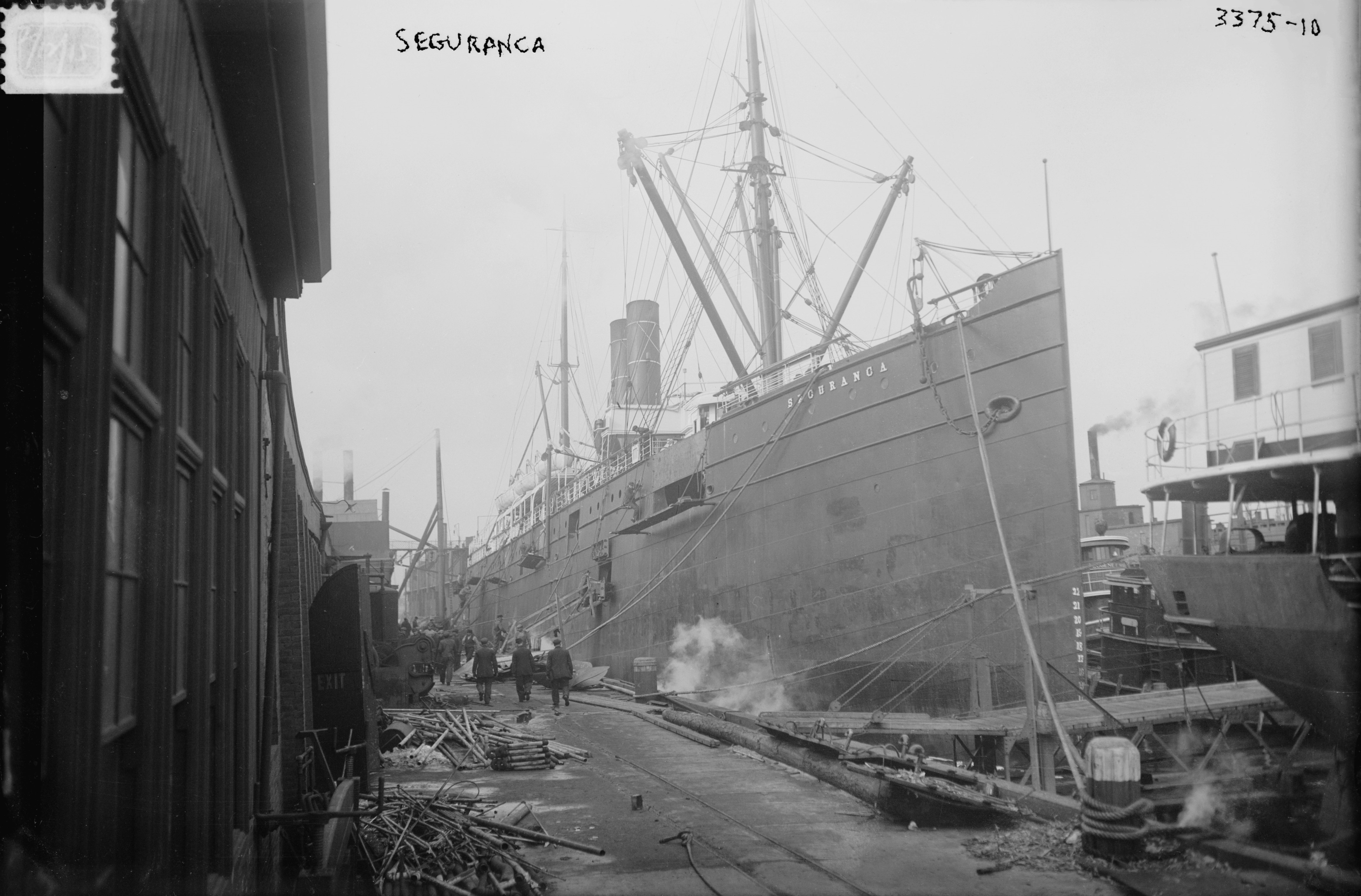
Vigilancia's sister ship Seguranca

In 1894 Ward Line bought both Seguranca and Vigilancia. By December 1894 Vigilancia's route was between New York, Tampico, and Progreso via Havana, Cuba. By October 1896 Vigilancia's ports of call included Vera Cruz. On 1 November Fitzhugh Lee, US Consul-General, left Havana for New York aboard her.

On 11 June 1897 Vigilancia was steaming from Havana to New York when a passenger in her second-class accommodation died. He was buried at sea. There was no ship's doctor aboard, and the cause of death was unknown. When the ship reached New York on 14 June, 11 passengers from second class were quarantined on Hoffman Island as a precaution against yellow fever.

=== Troopship ===
In the Spanish–American War in 1898 Vigilancia was converted into Transport No. 23, with capacity for 45 officers and 800 enlisted men. On 14 June that year she left Tampa carrying the 71st New York Infantry Regiment. She arrived off Cuba on 22 June, and disembarked her troops at Siboney two days later. On 24 August that year she left Pacific Street, Brooklyn carrying 875 men of the 23rd Regiment, Kansas Volunteers. This was an African-American regiment, with an African-American commander, Colonel James Beck. She had rough weather on the voyage, and disembarked her troops at Santiago de Cuba on 31 August. On 6 September she left Santiago carrying 140 soldiers who were described as "convalescents". Three of them died at sea. Two were buried at sea, and the third was brought ashore for burial on land. On 13 September she disembarked her troops at Camp Wikoff at Montauk, Long Island. 12 of her patients were brought ashore on stretchers.

=== San Ciriaco hurricane ===
On 9 August 1899 Vigilancia left New York with 50 or 60 passengers. On 12 August she ran into the San Ciriaco hurricane. She hove to for two days, then turned north to get out of the storm. She then sighted the Morgan Line steamship Winifred, which was disabled with her engine room flooded, superstructure damaged, and her funnel and lifeboats lost. Vigilancia towed Winifred to Nassau, Bahamas, where the pair arrived on 18 August. Vigilancia had been due in Havana on 13 August, and since 15 August there had been fears that she had foundered in the hurricane.

=== Aground off Cuba ===
On 10 January 1901 Vigilancia left Vera Cruz for New York via Progreso and Havana. On 15 January she grounded in fog on a reef called Los Colorados, about 80 nautical miles (150 km) west of Havana, and 6 nautical miles (11 km) from land. She was lying in 11 feet (3 m) of water forward and 14 feet (4 m) aft. Her boilers were displaced, but she was not leaking. Another Ward Line steamship, Orizaba, went to her aid; took off the passengers, cattle and cargo she was carrying were taken off; and landed the 58 passengers at Havana. By 17 January a high north wind and heavy rain were pounding Vigilancia, and it was feared she would be wrecked. She was on the reef until 3 June, when she was refloated and towed to Havana.

=== Two fires ===
On 12 May 1906 Vigilancia was en route from New York to Havana, carrying 62 passengers, when a fire was discovered in her cargo hold. She was near Cape Lookout Lightship at the time, and a boat from the lightship went alongside her. Her stores were destroyed, and her cargo was badly damaged by flooding her holds to extinguish the fire. She reached Havana on 15 May, a day late.

By 1909 Vigilancia's ports of call included Guantánamo, Manzanillo, and Santiago. At 11:55 hrs on 25 July 1909 she reached New York from the West Indies and Cuba; docked at Pier 18 at the foot of Joralemon Street; and disembarked 54 passengers. At 15:20 hrs her Second Officer discovered a fire in one of her forward holds. By 1909 she was equipped with wireless telegraphy, so her wireless operator transmitted a distress signal to call the New York City Fire Department.

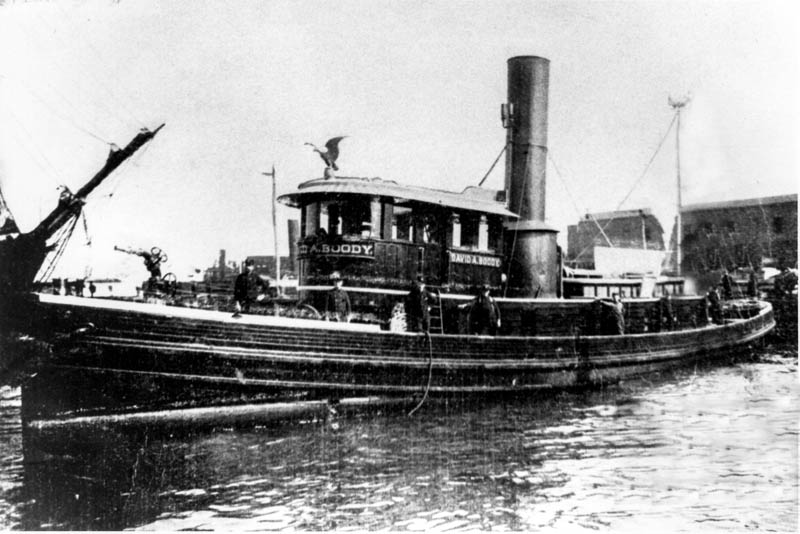
New York fireboat David A. Boody

The fireboats Abram S. Hewitt and David A. Boody fought the fire, pouring water into her forward holds. Engine Company 124 also fought the fire, along with a dozen men of the Fourth Division of the United States Navy Reserve's Second Naval Battalion, who arrived in a launch. Later, Seth Low relieved Abram S. Hewitt. Eventually Vigilancia was afire from amidships to her bow, listing to starboard because of the water the firefighters poured into her, and her masts and one of her funnels collapsed. At 21:30 hrs she broke her after mooring line, sank in 24 feet (7 m) of water, and righted herself as she settled on the bottom. By October 1909 Vigilancia had been raised and repaired, and was back in service.

=== Rescuing Atlas passengers ===
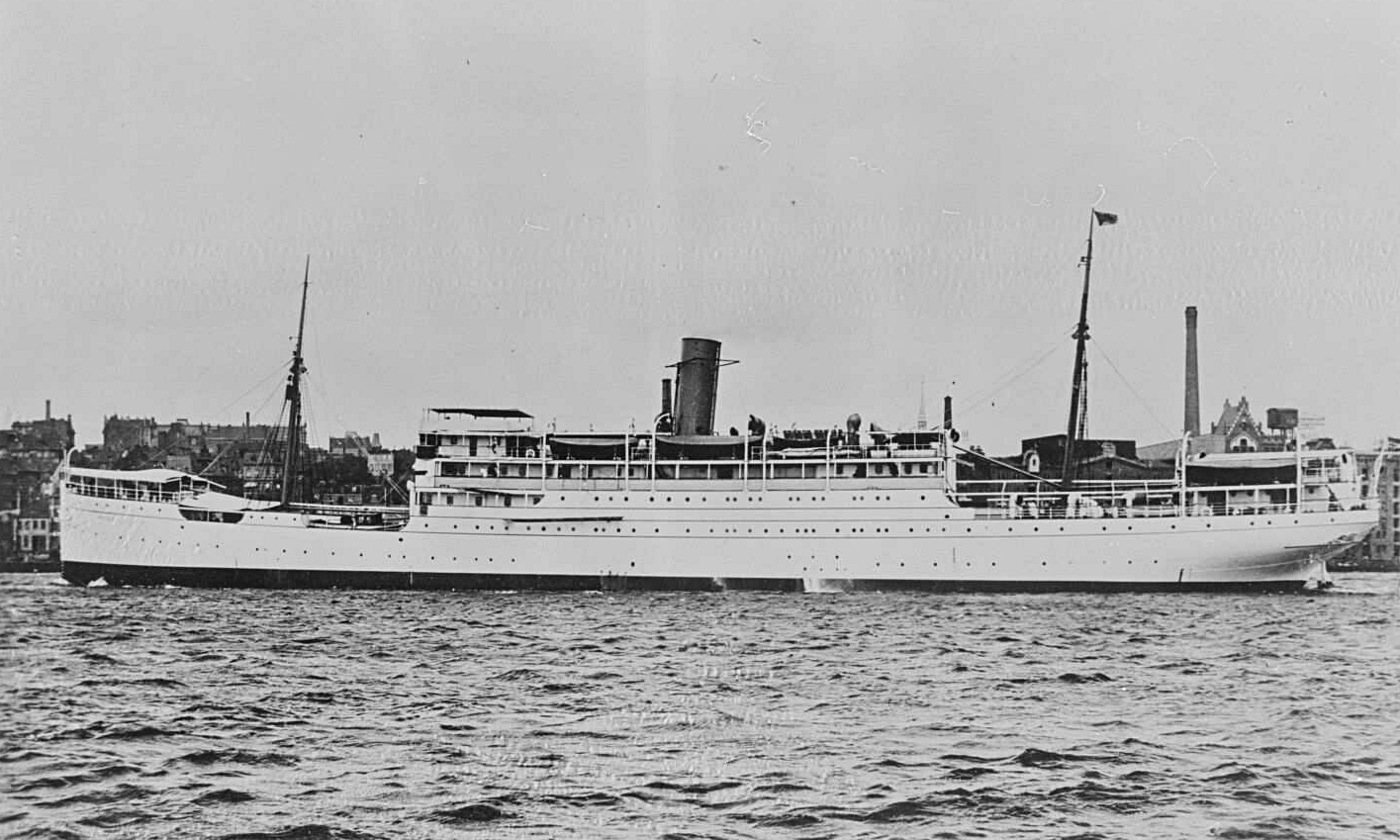
HAPAG Atlas liner Prinz Joachim

By July 1911, Seguranca and Vigilancia's scheduled route was between New York and Tampico in Mexico, via Nassau. On 22 November 1911 the Hamburg America Line ship Prinz Joachim grounded off Samana Cay in the Bahamas. Seguranca rescued her 84 passengers and took them to Nassau. There, all but eight of them transferred to Vigilancia, which took them to Jamaica.

By 1912 Vigilancia's ports of call included Cienfuegos. By 1914 her wireless call sign was KWV. In September 1914 she was still in Ward Line service.

== Cotton to Germany ==
By January 1915 Walker, Armstrong & Co had bought Vigilancia, registered her in Savannah, and had her converted into a cargo-only ship to export cotton to Europe. Walker, Armstrong & Co had bought several ships, and planned a regular service between Savannah and Europe. A different shipowner, Edward N Breitung, was negotiating to buy Seguranca for the same purpose.

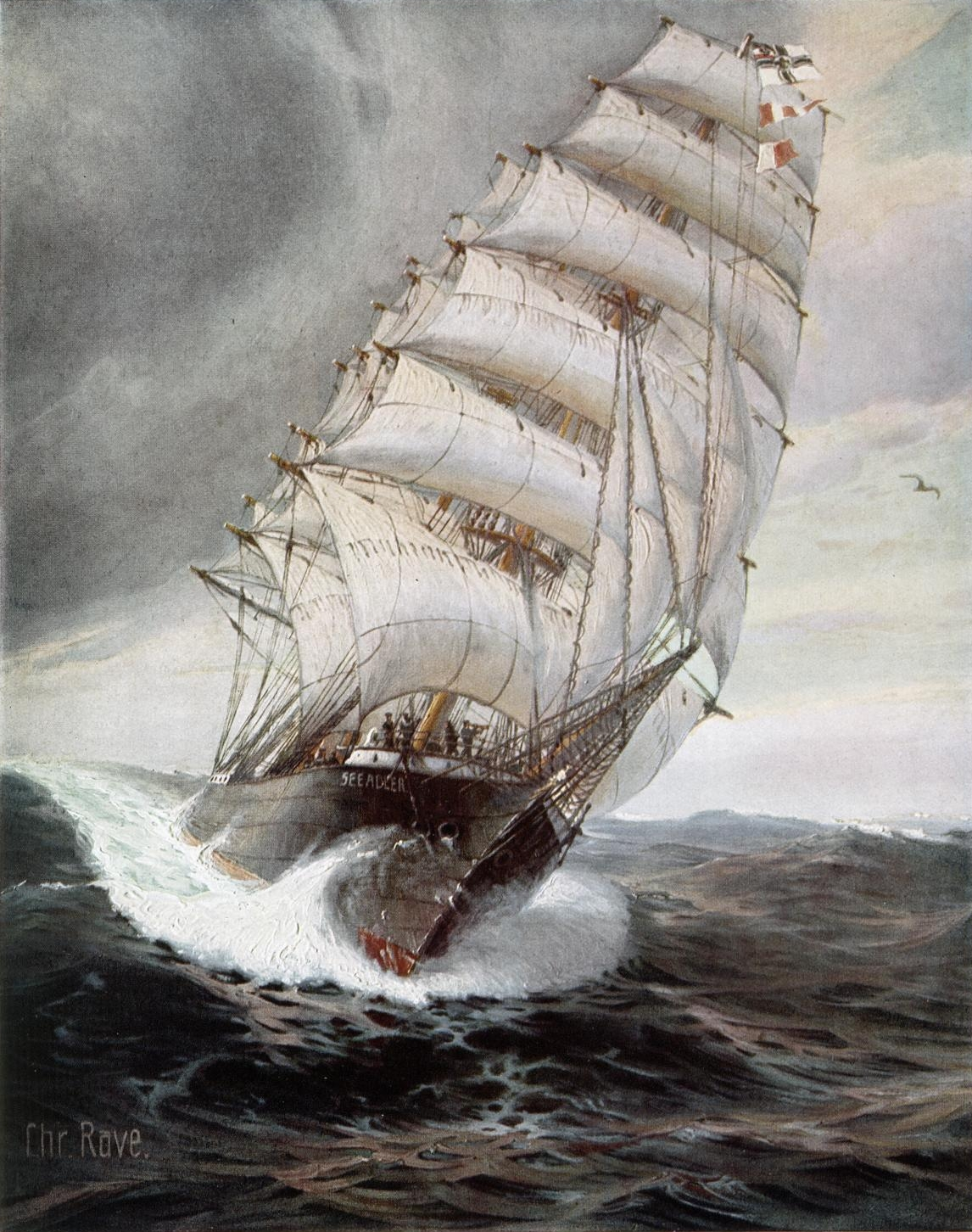
Pass of Balmaha, painted by Christopher Rave

On 22 February Vigilancia left Savannah with her first cargo of cotton for Bremen in Germany. She bore neutrality markings, including the Flag of the United States painted prominently on both sides of her hull, and a large US flag suspended between her foremast and mainmast. The next day a mine sank Carib, another of Walker, Armstrong's ships, off the German island of Norderney in the North Sea. Walker, Armstrong routed Vigilancia around the north of Scotland into the North Sea, claiming that this was to avoid minefields. By 10 March a Royal Navy cruiser had intercepted her and taken her to Kirkwall in Orkney to inspect her cargo. Another US ship carrying cotton to Germany, Pass of Balmaha, was likewise detained. The British inspected the cargo of both ships, and then allowed them to continue.

== Trucks to the Entente ==
In June 1916 the Gaston, Williams and Wigmore Steamship Corporation (GW&W) bought Vigilancia. She was registered in Wilmington, Delaware.

GW&W had been founded in October 1914 with the support of the Guaranty Trust Company. It planned cargo-only services, both transatlantic between New York and Archangelsk; and transpacific between San Francisco and the Far East. By February 1916 GW&W claimed to have bought six ships, chartered another six, and ordered six new ones to be built. GW&W shipped large numbers of US-built motor vehicles to the Entente Powers, including Packard and Peerless trucks. By October 1916 GW&W was operating the Globe Steamship Company, with five ships, and GW&W stock was listed by the New York Stock Exchange. In December 1916 GW&W paid its staff a 10 percent bonus. In February 1917 GW&W bought 35, 37 and 39 Broadway, on which to build a new six-storey headquarters.

On 13 November 1916 Vigilancia reached Norfolk, Virginia from Bordeaux, France. On 9 January 1917 she left Lisbon, Portugal, for New York, where she was due on 23 January.

== Loss ==
Despite US neutrality, the Central Powers sank a number of US merchant ships. On 1 February 1917 Germany announced it was resuming unrestricted submarine warfare. On 3 February U-53 captured and scuttled the cargo ship Housatonic, and on 12 February U-35 did the same to the schooner Lyman M. Law. On 26 February President Woodrow Wilson addressed both houses of Congress, asking for the power to arm US merchant ships defensively, and to give those ships gunners to crew them. Also on 26 February, Vigilancia was due to leave New York for Le Havre in France. Just after she left her pier, 35 members of her crew of 45 refused to sail; went over her side; and boarded a tug to return to shore, because her owners refused to pay war bonuses of 75 percent for deck crew and 100 percent for engine room crew.

Vigilancia left New York on 28 February. Her Master was a Captain Frank A Middleton, and her crew had 43 or 45 members (sources differ). 20 including Captain Middleton were US citizens; another five were Puerto Ricans; and the crew also included at least four other nationalities. She carried a cargo of sugar and other foods, and had orders to sail via São Miguel in the Azores, where she was to bunker if necessary. Her neutrality markings included her name and "NEW YORK" painted on both sides of her hull in white letters five feet high, was well as the US flag painted on both sides of her hull.

At 10:00 hrs on 16 March 1917 Vigilancia was in the Southwestern Approaches, making about 11 knots (20 km/h), when U-70 fired two torpedoes at her without warning. One missed, passing astern of her. The other torpedo hit her starboard side in way of her Number 3 cargo hatch, and Vigilancia foundered between seven and ten minutes later. Her crew lowered two lifeboats, but one of them capsized, throwing 25 men into the sea. Their shipmates in the other lifeboat rescued ten of the men, but the other 15 drowned. The capsizing was variously attributed to a heavy swell, or to there being no time to stop her engine before abandoning ship, so she was still under way when her boats were launched. The ship sank 145 nautical miles (269 km) west of Bishop Rock at position 48°57′N 9°34′W.

The survivors were in the lifeboat for about 36 hours. Hypothermia paralysed one of the engine room staff. At night Captain Middleton fired several distress flares. These elicited no response, so at 16:00 hrs on 18 March the lifeboat reached St Mary's, Isles of Scilly by the survivors' own effort. The US Consul at Plymouth, England reported that the dead were five US citizens, five Spaniards, two Greeks, one Peruvian, one Puerto Rican, and one Venezuelan.

== Context and consequences ==
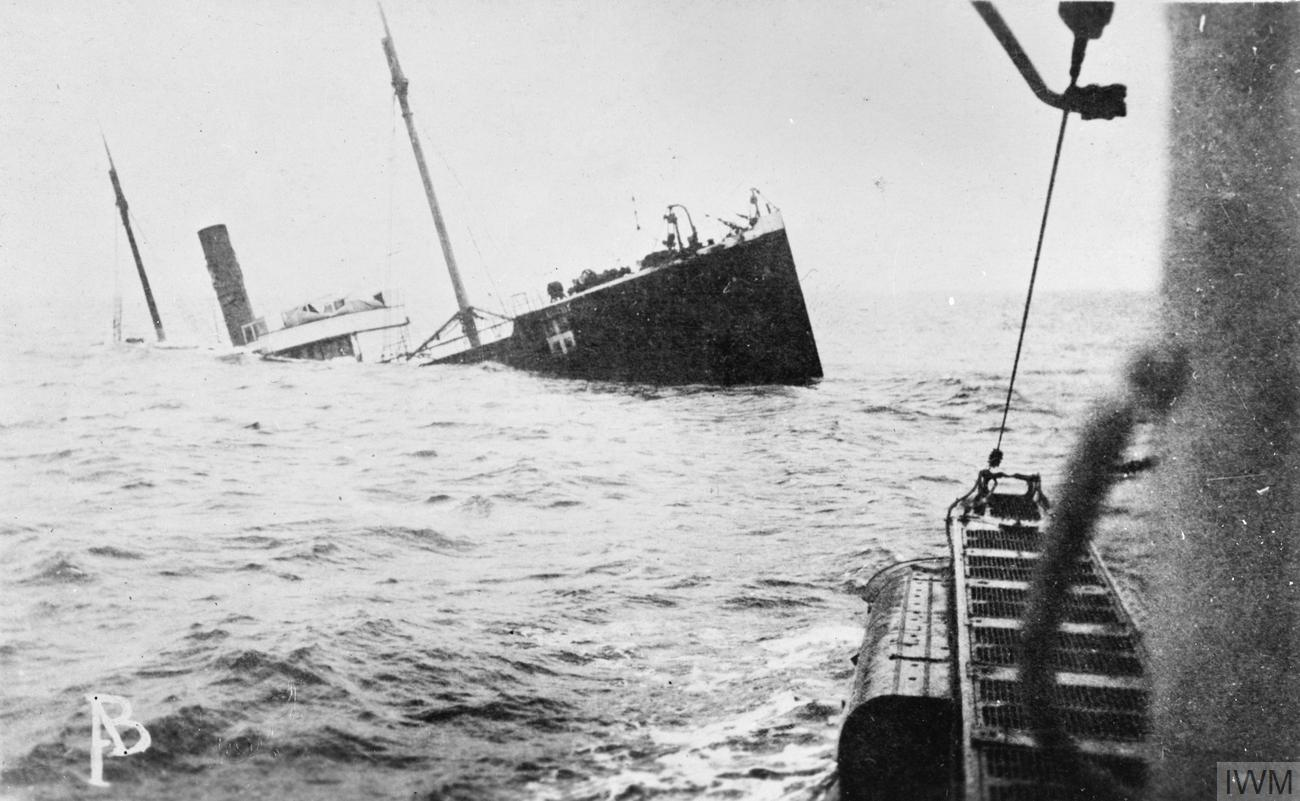
View from UC-21 of Illinois sinking

On 17 March, the day after Vigilancia was sunk, U-boats stopped and sank the cargo ship City of Memphis and the tanker Illinois. In those two cases the U-boats had followed surfaced; forced the ship to heave to; and allowed the crew to abandon her without loss of life before sinking her. However, one of the five lifeboats that City of Memphis launched became separated from the others. For at least 24 hours this caused fear that its occupants must have died or been captured. Three sinkings within two days, added to earlier sinkings such as the cargo ship Algonquin on 12 March, had an effect on public and political opinion in the US. Newspapers called it an act of war, or words to that effect.

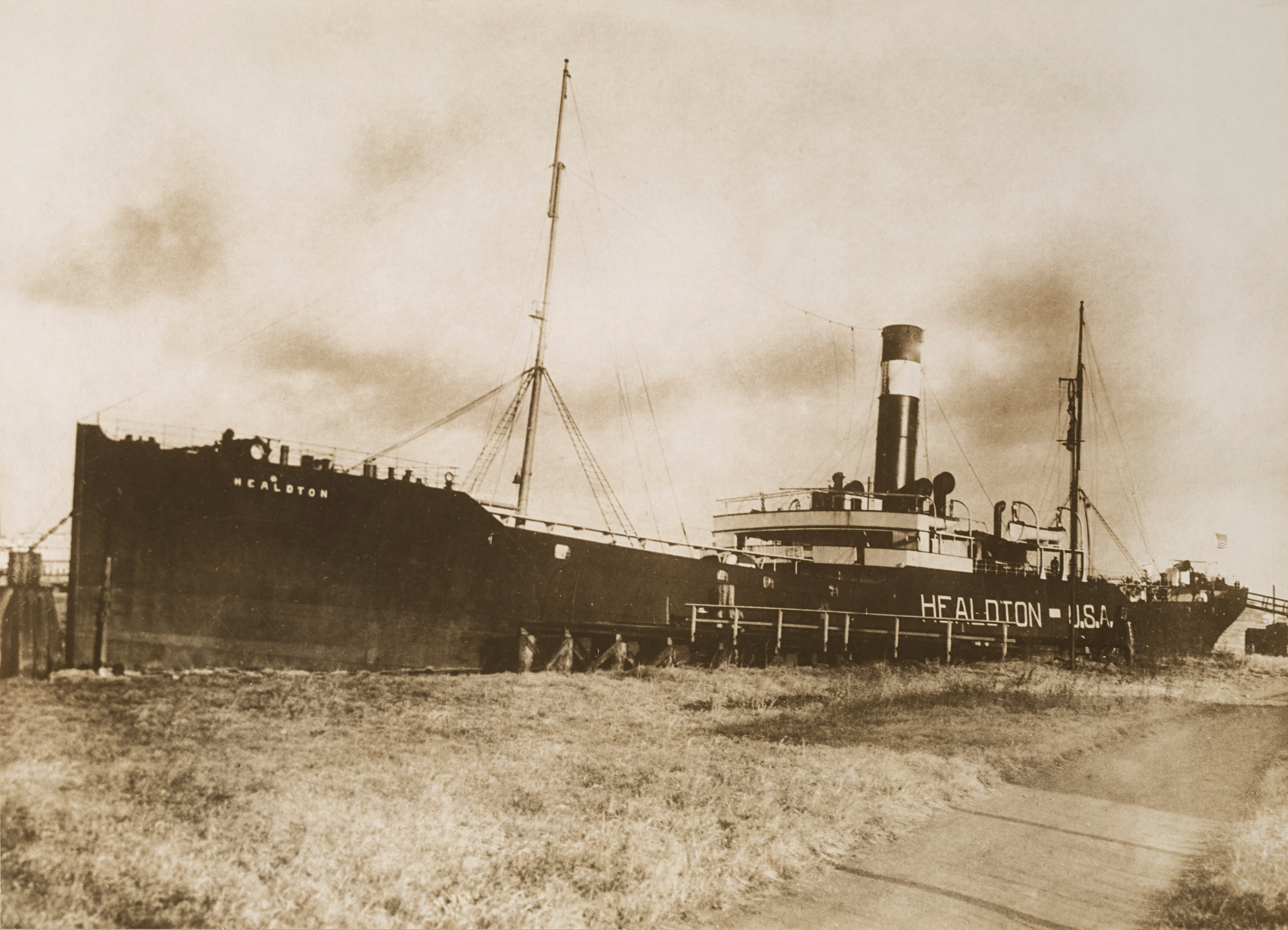
The tanker Healdton with "HEALDTON – U.S.A." painted in large white letters on her black hull to emphasise her neutrality

In Germany, writing in the Deutsche Tageszeitung, the former naval officer Ernst Graf zu Reventlow welcomed the sinkings. "It is good that American ships have been obliged to learn that the German prohibition is effective and that there is no question of distinctive treatment for the United States...". The Dusseldorfer General Anzieger was also said to have welcomed the sinkings. About the same time as Reventlow's comments were published, either a U-boat or a mine sank the Standard Oil Company of New Jersey's tanker Healdton on 21 March. 21 members of her crew were killed, including seven US citizens.

On 2 April, President Wilson asked Congress to declare war against Germany. During the congressional debate of the proposal, news came that a U-boat had sunk Aztec, causing the death of 28 of her crew, including 11 US citizens. On 6 April, Congress passed the motion by an overwhelming majority, and the US declared war on Germany.

== Bibliography ==
- Bureau of Navigation (1917). Forty-Eighth Annual List of Merchant Vessels of the United States (PDF). Washington, DC: Government Publishing Office – via ibiblio.
- Carlisle, Rodney (2011). "1: The Voyage of the Vigilancia". Sovereignty at Sea: U.S. Merchant Ships and American Entry into World War I. New Perspectives on Maritime History and Nautical Archaeology. Gainesville, Florida: University Press of Florida. ISBN 978-0813037622.
- "Germany's acts of war against people of U. S." The Washington Times. Washington, D.C. 7 April 1917. p. 2 – via Library of Congress.
- Lloyd's Register of British and Foreign Shipping. Vol. I.–Steamers. London: Lloyd's Register of Shipping. 1891 – via Internet Archive.
- Lloyd's Register of British and Foreign Shipping. Vol. I.–Steamers. London: Lloyd's Register of Shipping. 1896 – via Internet Archive.
- Lloyd's Register of British and Foreign Shipping. Vol. I.–Steamers. London: Lloyd's Register of Shipping. 1910 – via Internet Archive.
- Lloyd's Register of Shipping. Vol. I.–Steamers. London: Lloyd's Register of Shipping. 1914 – via Internet Archive.
- The Marconi Press Agency Ltd (1914). The Year Book of Wireless Telegraphy and Telephony. London: The Marconi Press Agency Ltd.
