= Zophar Mills =

Former New York City fireboat

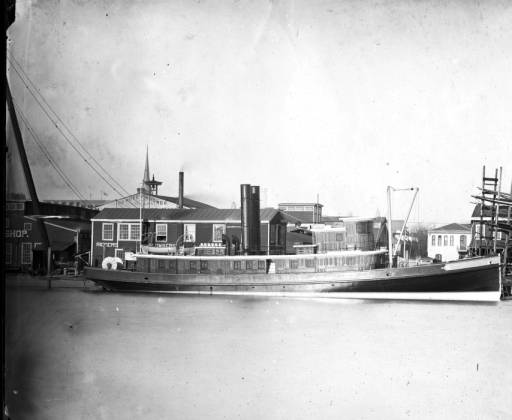
- Zophar Mills in 1882.

History

United States
- Name: Zophar Mills
- Operator: Fire Department of New York City
- Launched: 1882
- In service: 1883
- Out of service: 1958
- Fate: Abandoned at Staten Island boat graveyard

General characteristics
- Type: Fireboat
- Length: 120 ft (37 m)
- Beam: 25 ft (7.6 m)
- Draft: 12 ft (3.7 m)

Zophar Mills was a fireboat operated by the Fire Department of New York City from 1883 to 1958. She was the department's first iron-hulled vessel and had a pumping capacity of 6,000 US gal (23,000 L; 5,000 imp gal) per minute.

Around 1882, Zohpar Mills reportedly collided with a pier at Little 12th Street (as of 2022, the present-day location of Little Island at Pier 55).

According to some accounts, she was the first fireboat called to the burning of General Slocum, where over a thousand people died. Other accounts say Abram S. Hewitt was the first fireboat to be dispatched.

== See also ==
- Fireboats in New York City
