= Seth Low (fireboat) =

Retired New York fireboat (1885–1917)

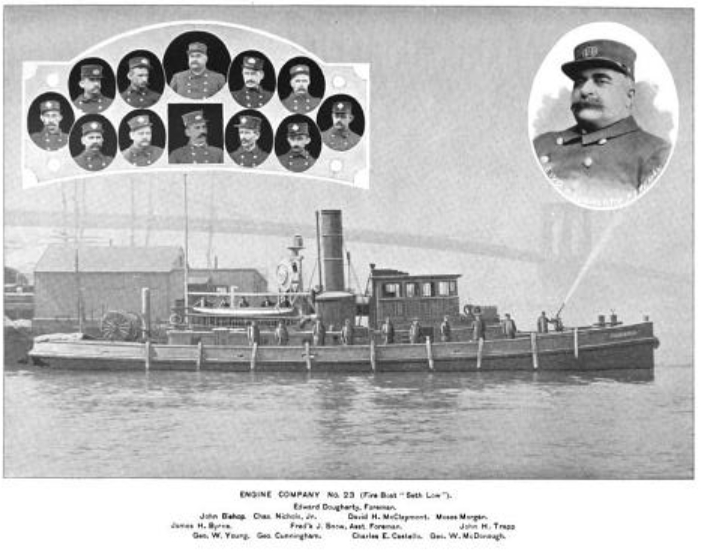
Seth Low

The Seth Low was a fireboat built for the Brooklyn Fire Department in Brooklyn, New York, which operated from 1885 to 1917. Prior to her commissioning the Brooklyn Fire Department had relied on fireboats from neighboring municipality New York City. Unlike her opposite number of the New York City Fire Department (FDNY), which had hulls of iron, or steel, the Seth Low was a wooden-hulled vessel.

Her namesake Seth Low was the 23rd mayor of Brooklyn from 1882 to 1885 and later served as the 92nd mayor of New York City from 1902 to 1903.

The Seth Low had a small lounge for her officers in the bows, and a small bunkroom, with four bunks, for off-duty sailors in the stern.

On 25 July 1909 Seth Low relieved Abram S. Hewitt, which with David A. Boody had been fighting a cargo fire aboard the Ward Line steamship Vigilancia.

== See also ==
- Fireboats in New York City
