= SS Aztec =

US-owned cargo ship sunk in 1917

History
- Name: 1894: Canterbury; 1894: Aztec
- Namesake: 1894: Canterbury; 1895: Aztecs
- Owner: 1894: Blindell Bros & Co; 1895: Albert Smith; 1897: Pacific Mail SS Co
- Port of registry: 1895: (United Kingdom) London; 1897: (Hawaii) Honolulu; 1902: (United States) New York
- Builder: Edwards Shipbuilding Co, Howdon
- Yard number: 69
- Launched: 21 June 1894
- Completed: September 1894
- Identification: 1895: UK official number 104837; 1895: code letters NRHS; 1898: code letters HBFN; 1899: Hawaiian official number 324; 1901: US official number 107547; 1901: code letters KPWD; by 1914: call sign WWQ
- Fate: sunk by torpedo, 1 April 1917

General characteristics
- Type: cargo ship
- Tonnage: 3,508 GRT, 2,303 NRT
- Length: 349.2 ft (106.4 m)
- Beam: 43.0 ft (13.1 m)
- Depth: 26.6 ft (8.1 m)
- Decks: 2
- Installed power: 299 NHP
- Propulsion: 1 × triple-expansion engine; 1 × screw
- Crew: 1917: 34 + 13 US Navy gunners
- Armament: March 1917: 2 × 5-inch guns

SS Aztec was a cargo steamship that was built in England in 1894 as Canterbury. She was renamed Aztec when she changed owners in 1895. The Pacific Mail Steamship Company bought her in 1897. In March 1917 she was the first United States merchant ship to be defensively armed in response to the Central Powers' attacks on neutral US shipping in the First World War.

A U-boat sank Aztec in April 1917, killing 28 of her ship's company. 11 were US citizens, making her the third US merchant ship to suffer fatalities when sunk by the Imperial German Navy while the US was still neutral. Six of her crew were native Hawaiians, and all but one of them were killed. They were the first native Hawaiians killed by German forces in the First World War.

President Woodrow Wilson had already decided to ask the United States Congress to declare war before Aztec was sunk. The sinkings of other US merchant ships before her, including two with fatalities in March 1917, was one of the factors that helped to ensure a congressional majority to declare war before the news of Aztec's loss reached the US. However, the news did affect political and public opinion in the Territory of Hawaii.

== Building ==
In 1894 the Edwards Shipbuilding Company at Howdon on the River Tyne built three sister ships. Yard numbers 67 and 68 were launched on 20 February and 7 April as Kurrachee and Caspian respectively. Both ships were for Nelson, Donkin and Company of London. Yard number 69, built to the same measurements, was launched on 21 June as Canterbury and completed that September for Blindell Brothers and Company of Newcastle upon Tyne.

Canterbury's registered length was 349.2 ft (106.4 m), her beam was 43.0 ft (13.1 m), and her depth was 26.6 ft (8.1 m). As built, her tonnages were 3,508 GRT and 2,303 NRT. She had a single screw, driven by a three-cylinder triple-expansion engine built by Blair and Company of Stockton-on-Tees that was rated at 299 NHP. As built, the ship was a coal-burner. By 1914 she had been converted to burn oil fuel.

== Ownership, registration and identification ==
In 1895 Albert Smith of London bought Canterbury, renamed her Aztec, and registered her in London. Her United Kingdom official number was 104837 and her code letters were NRHS.

In 1897 the Pacific Mail Steamship Company bought Aztec and registered her in Honolulu in the Republic of Hawaii. By 1898 her code letters were HBFN, and by 1899 her Hawaiian official number was 324. By 1901 she was still registered in Hawaii, but under the United States, with the US official number 107547 and code letters KPWD. By 1902 she was registered in New York.

By 1914 Aztec was equipped with wireless telegraphy. Her call sign was WWQ.

News reports from 1917 say that the Oriental Navigation Company, of 17 Battery Place, New York, either owned Aztec, or managed her for Pacific Mail. An Oriental Navigation Company with that address did exist, but was not incorporated until 1923.

While the US was neutral in the First World War, Pacific Mail had neutrality markings painted on Aztec's hull. Amidships below her superstructure was painted "S.S. AZTEC NEW YORK U.S.A." in large white capital letters on her black hull. The Flag of the United States was painted on two places on each side of her hull: abreast of her foremast, and abreast of her poop.

== Arming US merchant ships ==
Despite US neutrality, the Central Powers sank a number of US merchant ships. On 1 February 1917 Germany announced it was resuming unrestricted submarine warfare. On 3 February U-53 captured and scuttled the cargo ship Housatonic, and on 12 February U-35 did the same to the schooner Lyman M. Law. On 26 February President Wilson addressed both houses of Congress, asking for the power to arm US merchant ships defensively, and to give those ships gunners to crew them.

The House of Representatives overwhelmingly passed an Armed Ships Bill, but on 28 February the Senate Foreign Affairs Committee reduced the bill's scope and powers. Republican Senator Robert M. La Follette of Wisconsin led a small group of Progressive Republicans who filibustered it on 28 February and 2, 3, and 4 March, ensuring that it was talked out before the end of the 64th United States Congress.

On 5 March, Wilson asked Attorney General Thomas Gregory whether he had the power to arm merchant ships under existing law, without the bill being enacted. Secretary of State Robert Lansing and Navy Secretary Josephus Daniels thought that he did. On 9 March, Wilson told Congress that he would start arming US merchant ships at once; that US Navy shipyards had already made all necessary preparations to do so; and work would start on 12 March.

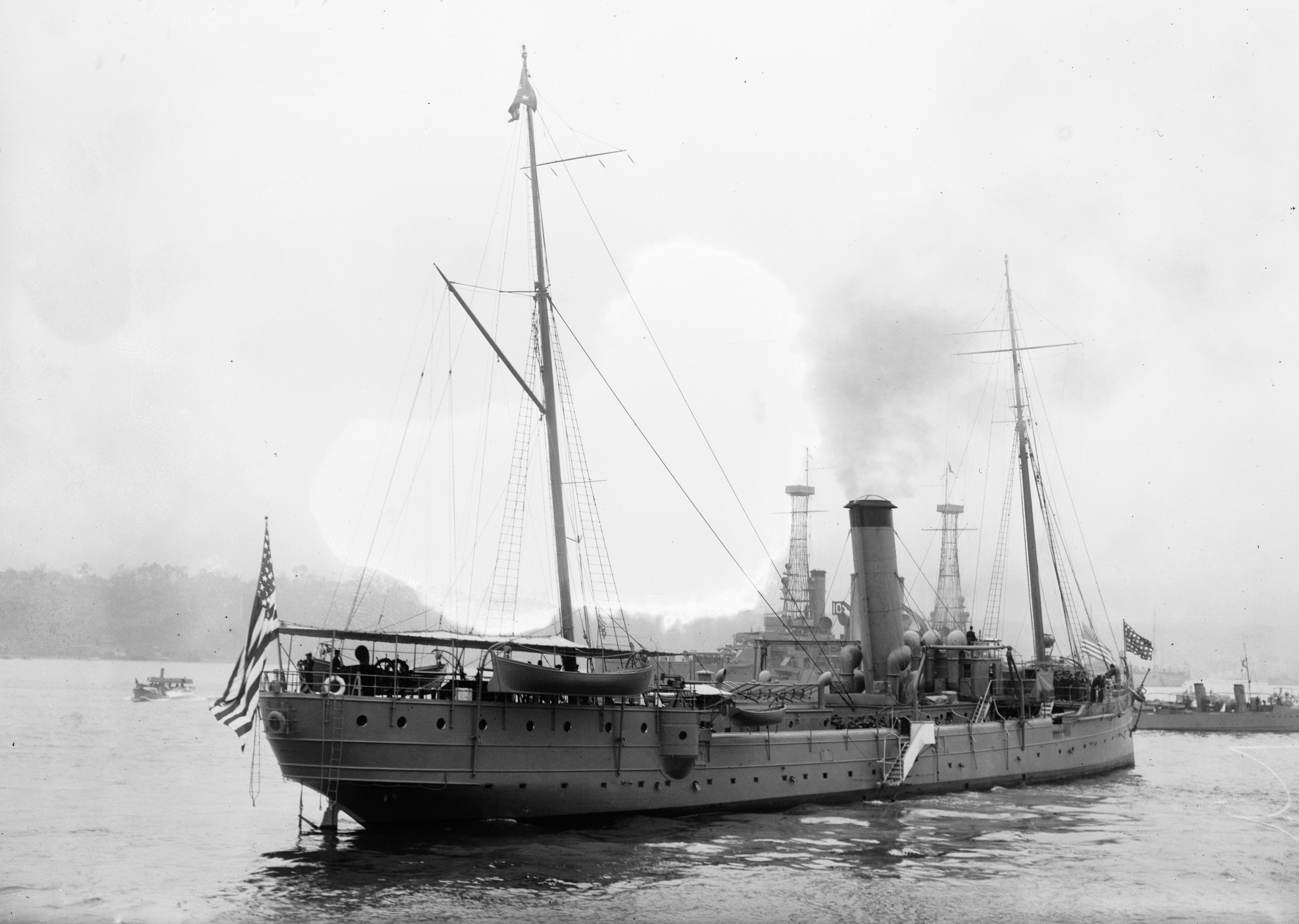
USS Dolphin, from which a lieutenant and 11 ratings were transferred to Aztec to crew her guns

Aztec was the first US merchant ship to be armed. She was equipped with two 5-inch guns: one forward, and the other on her poop. A lieutenant and 11 ratings were detached from USS Dolphin at Washington Navy Yard and transferred to Aztec to crew her guns.

== Loss ==
On 18 March 1917 Aztec left New York for Le Havre in France with a cargo of copper, steel, lumber, machinery, and chemicals. On the voyage, Lieutenant William Fuller Gresham, the Navy officer, ordered gunnery practice twice every day, aiming at barrels thrown overboard.

On 1 April Aztec was only a few hours away from the coast of Brittany when the German submarine SM U-46 torpedoed her without warning at 21:30 hrs. Her port side was hit amidships, she heeled over to starboard, and a man on deck was thrown overboard. The impact put her electric lighting and wireless out of action. She settled by her bow and listed to starboard. Lieutenant Gresham ordered his crews to their guns. As her bow was sinking, Number 1 gun could not be used. Number 2 gun on her poop was quickly manned, but neither Gresham nor the gun crew could see the attacker.

By about 21:40 hrs her bow was under water, and her Master, Captain Walter O'Brien, gave the order to abandon ship. The Third Engineer shut down her furnaces, cut off the oil supply, stopped her engine, and evacuated the engine room and stokehold. Aztec sank in the Southwestern Approaches at position 48°20′N 06°00′W, 25 nautical miles (46 km) west of Ushant. It was a moonlit night, but with hail and rain squalls impairing visibility. None of Aztec's complement saw a submarine or torpedo.

== Rescue and search ==
Aztec was listing to starboard, and that side of the ship was in the lee from the high wind. The crew launched boats 1 and 3 on that side. Captain O'Brien commanded Number 1 boat. His Second Officer commanded Number 3 boat. Despite the list to starboard, and the high wind on the port side, some of the crew tried to launch the number 2 boat on that side. The boat crashed against the side of the ship, and some of the crew were either crushed or drowned. According to some accounts, the boat may also have capsized.

Gresham had ordered his men to take a Colt machine gun and several hundred rounds of ammunition in Number 1 boat. But the boat was small and crowded, and twice nearly capsized in the heavy sea, so he ordered the gun and ammunition thrown overboard. Boats 1 and 3 were separated after about 15 minutes.

After about three hours the occupants of Number 1 boat could see a lighthouse at a range of 9 to 10 nautical miles (17 to 19 km), and the sighted the lights of an unidentified craft. Once they were sure it was not a submarine, they signaled to it with a Coston flare. The craft was a French Navy trawler. One early report said her name was Sirius; a later one said it was Jeanne d'Arc. The trawler towed the Number 1 boat until the sea calmed enough to transfer survivors aboard, then searched for Number 3 boat and its 18 occupants. A second patrol craft joined the search, but Number 3 boat was never found. It was presumed to have been swamped or capsized in the rough sea. The trawler then took the survivors to Brest. A total of 28 men from Aztec were lost. 27 were members of her merchant crew, and one was a Navy gunner.

Survivors suffered from intense cold, worsened by the rain, and the sea washing over the lifeboat. Some were hospitalised in Brest. On 4 April, Captain O'Brien and Lieutenant Gresham went to Paris to report to the US Embassy. With no sighting of a submarine or torpedo, Ambassador William G. Sharp's report to Washington, D.C. gave the impression that the ship could have struck a mine.

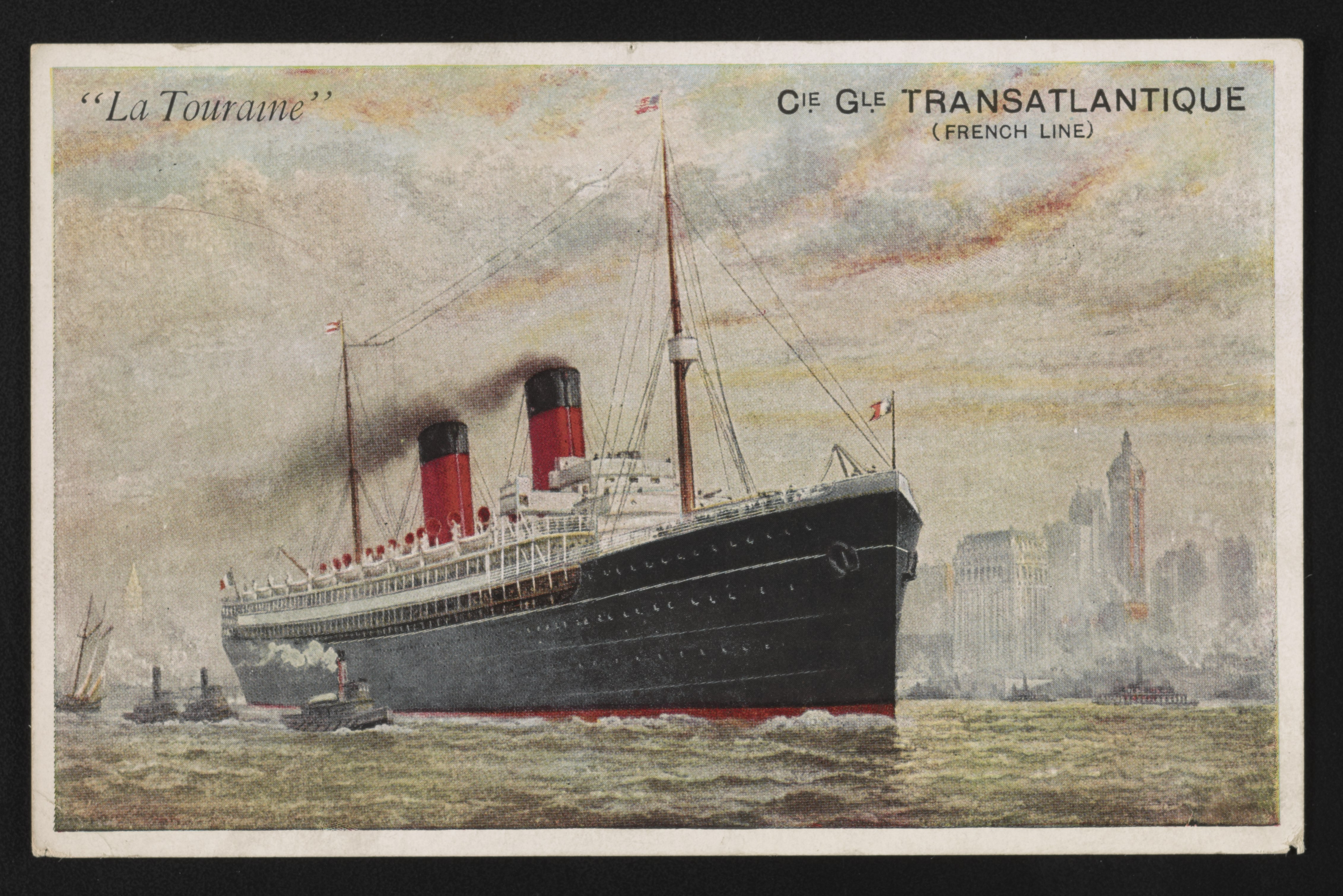
La Touraine, on which some of Aztec's survivors returned to New York

Some survivors returned to the US via Bordeaux, where they embarked on the CGT liner La Touraine to New York. They included Charles Nakalo, the only native Hawaiian survivor. Captain O'Brien and the surviving members of his merchant crew reached New York on 20 April. Lieutenant Gresham and his surviving gunners went to England via Boulogne and Folkestone. They embarked on American Line's Manchuria, which on 25 April reached New York, where they reported to Brooklyn Navy Yard.

== US declaration of war ==
On 2 April, Wilson asked Congress to declare war against Germany. At the time, news of Aztec's, late on the evening of 1 April, had not yet reached Washington. However, before the final vote was taken, Congress members had received news of the sinkings of not only Aztec on 1 April but also the cargo ship Missourian on 4 April. All of Missourian's crew survived, but US merchant seafarers had already been killed in the sinkings of Vigilancia on 16 March and Healdton on 21 March. Five other US merchant ships had also been sunk since 1 February.

During the debate, La Follette called Aztec a "problematic" case because she had been armed. When the motion was put on 6 April, he voted against it. However, both houses of Congress passed it overwhelmingly, and the US declared war on Germany.

== Commemorations ==
The men killed in Aztec's sinking included five native Hawaiians, one Chinese who lived in Hawaii, and one Tahitian. Representative George Kawaha prepared an adjournment motion for the Hawaii House of Representatives to honor the five Hawaiians. It asked Hawaiians to "Remember the Aztec" as people had "Remembered the USS Maine" which was sunk by an explosion in Havana Harbor in 1898.

Judge Clarence W. Ashford of the Hawaii state circuit court wrote to both houses of the Territorial Legislature, proposing a memorial service for the five Hawaiians. The service was held on Sunday 22 April 1917 at ʻIolani Palace in Honolulu, attended by about 2,000 people, including members of both houses of the Territorial Legislature, and the consuls of countries including China, France, Japan, Spain, and the United Kingdom.

On 2 April 2017 The Hawaii World War I Centennial Task Force commemorated the centenary of Aztec's sinking. A ceremony at Aloha Tower in Honolulu Harbor was followed by a flotilla going out to sea and casting flowers into the Pacific.

== Bibliography ==
- Carlisle, Rodney (2007). "The Attacks on U. S. Shipping that Precipitated American Entry into World War I" (PDF). The Northern Mariner. XVII (3). Canadian Nautical Research Society. ISSN 2561-5467.
- "Germany's acts of war against people of U. S." The Washington Times. Washington, D.C. 7 April 1917. p. 2 – via Library of Congress.
- Lloyd's Register of British and Foreign Shipping. Vol. I.–Steamers. London: Lloyd's Register of Shipping. 1896 – via Internet Archive.
- Lloyd's Register of British and Foreign Shipping. Vol. I.–Steamers. London: Lloyd's Register of Shipping. 1898 – via Internet Archive.
- Lloyd's Register of British and Foreign Shipping. Vol. I.–Steamers. London: Lloyd's Register of Shipping. 1899 – via Internet Archive.
- Lloyd's Register of British and Foreign Shipping. Vol. I.–Steamers. London: Lloyd's Register of Shipping. 1901 – via Internet Archive.
- Lloyd's Register of British and Foreign Shipping. Vol. I.–Steamers. London: Lloyd's Register of Shipping. 1902 – via Internet Archive.
- Lloyd's Register of Shipping. Vol. I.–Steamers. London: Lloyd's Register of Shipping. 1914 – via Internet Archive.
- The Marconi Press Agency Ltd (1914). The Year Book of Wireless Telegraphy and Telephony. London: The Marconi Press Agency Ltd.
- Mercantile Navy List. London. 1896 – via Crew List Index Project.
