= David A. Boody (fireboat) =

Retired New York fireboat (1892–1914)

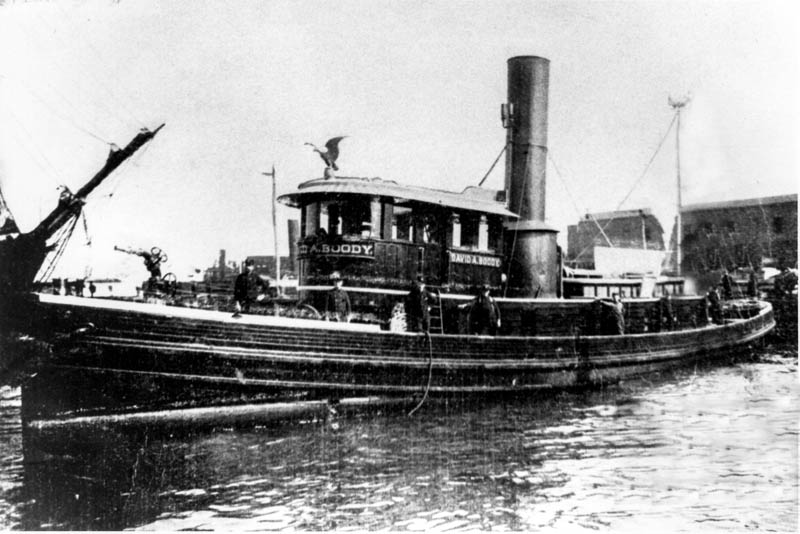

History
- Commissioned: December 15, 1892

The David A. Boody was a fireboat operated on the North River, the lower portion of the Hudson River, within New York state. She was built and commissioned in 1892 for the Brooklyn Fire Department and was operated by the BFD until Brooklyn's fleet was merged with that of nearby New York City.

She was a wooden-hulled steam powered vessel, 106 feet (32 m) long, 23 feet (7.0 m) wide, and 7 feet (2.1 m) deep. Her pumps could project 6,500 gallons per minute.

The boat was first called to action on December 17, 1892, in response to a large fire at a cotton warehouse in Brooklyn's Sunset Park neighborhood. Upon arrival, she assisted the Seth Low in extinguishing the blaze.

On October 22, 1905, the David Boody helped fight a fire that broke out aboard the lighter Joseph Codringham's cargo of barrels of oil. While other fireboats fought the fire on the lighter itself, the David Boody fought the burning oil that had spilled onto the river.

On July 25, 1909, David A. Boody and Abram S. Hewitt fought a cargo fire aboard the Ward Line steamship Vigilancia. Seth Low relieved Abram S. Hewitt before the fire was extinguished.

She was retired in 1914 as a cost-saving measure.
