= Abram S. Hewitt (fireboat) =

Retired New York City fireboat (1903–58)

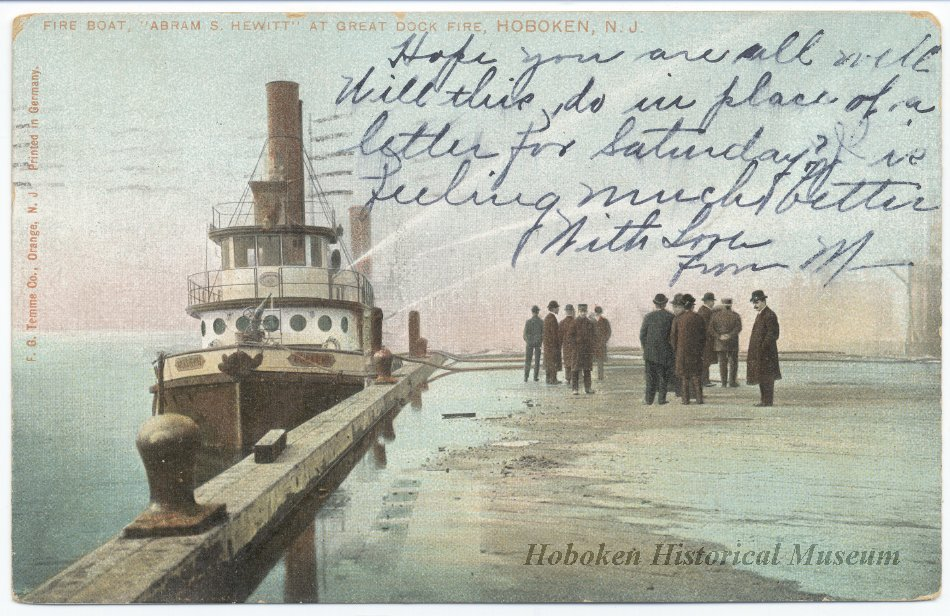
- Abram S. Hewitt in 1905.

History

United States
- Name: Abram S. Hewitt
- Operator: Fire Department of New York City
- Builder: New York Shipbuilding Corporation
- Launched: July 11, 1903
- In service: 1903
- Out of service: 1958
- Fate: Abandoned at Staten Island boat graveyard

General characteristics
- Type: Fireboat
- Length: 117 feet (36 m)
- Beam: 25 feet (7.6 m)
- Draft: 10.5 feet (3.2 m)
- Notes: Pumping capacity 7,000 gallons per minute

The Abram S. Hewitt was a coal-powered fireboat operated by the New York City Fire Department from 1903 to 1958. She was the department's last coal-powered vessel and had a pumping capacity of 7,000 gallons per minute.

She was launched on July 11, 1903, at the shipyards of the New York Shipbuilding Corporation in Camden, New Jersey. She was commissioned in October 1903, and was named after recently deceased former mayor Abram Hewitt.

== Operational history ==
According to some accounts, she was the first fireboat called to the 1904 burning of the General Slocum, in which more than a thousand people died. Other accounts say the Zophar Mills was the first fireboat to be dispatched.

On July 25, 1909, Abram S. Hewitt and David A. Boody fought a cargo fire aboard the Ward Line steamship Vigilancia. Seth Low relieved Abram S. Hewitt before the fire was extinguished.

On August 14, 1913, a fire was discovered at a large oil storage yard, on what was then Long Island City, and the Abram S. Hewitt was sent to try to put it out. While extinguishing the fire her "bow gun", her frontmost water cannon, burst from her footings, flying into the air, and striking Brereton E. Johnson, the firefighter assigned to it. He was declared dead, at the scene.

On January 28, 1927, the Abram S. Hewitt's captain, John Connoly, was jolted into the Hudson River by a collision. Although he was burdened by heavy fire equipment he was able to swim to a barge, where he clung to a boathook lowered to him by a crew member. It took the Abram S. Hewitt half an hour to return and rescue him, because it was damaged by the collision.

On April 29, 1930, the Abram S. Hewitt responded when Cornelius Vanderbilt III's luxurious yacht, the Winchester, was set ablaze following a boiler explosion.

The Abram S. Hewitt was called to assist other fireboats when a large fire burst out of control a second time. The fire burst out at pier 4. Barrels of flammable liquids had destroyed the pier, and two neighboring piers, but firefighters thought the blaze had been brought under control. However, when it burst out again the Abram S. Hewitt was better suited to navigate through debris, close to the fire.

The Abram S. Hewitt was eventually taken to the Staten Island boat graveyard.

== See also ==
- Fireboats in New York City
