= SS Georgia (1890) =

German-built cargo ship sunk in 1917

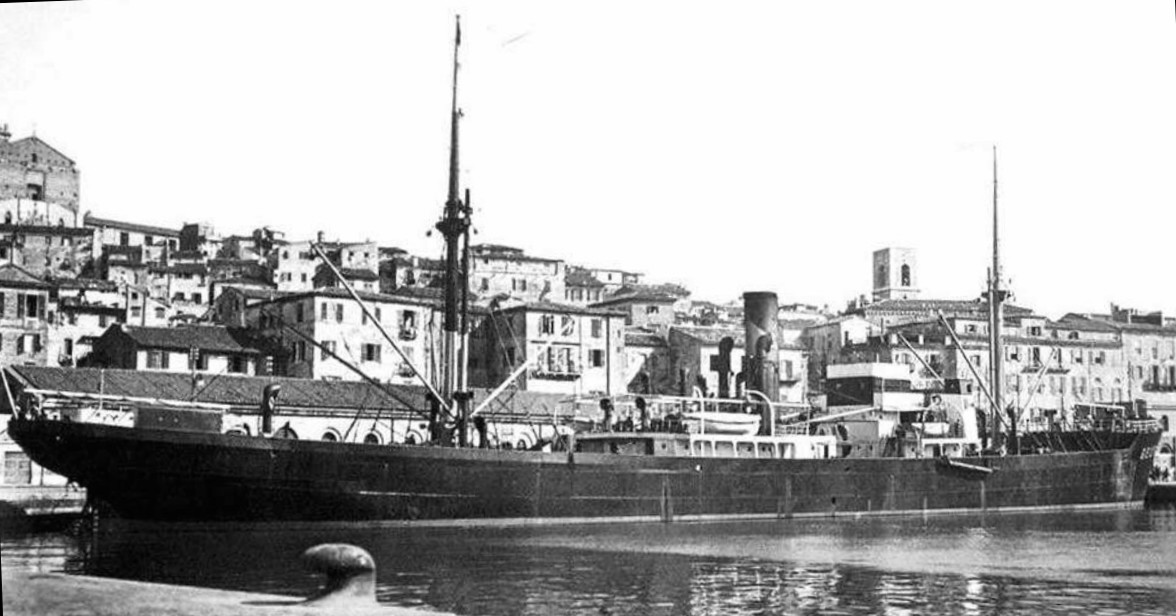
- The ship as Georgia

History
- Name: 1891: Pickhuben; 1895: Georgia; 1915: Housatonic
- Namesake: 1891: a street in Hamburg; 1895: Georgia; 1915: Housatonic River
- Owner: 1891: Dampfschiffs-Reederei „Hansa“; 1892: Hamburg America Line; 1915: Housatonic Steamship Co
- Operator: 1915: Edward F Geer; 1916: Brown, Jenkinson & Co
- Port of registry: 1891: (German Empire) Hamburg; 1915: (United States) New York
- Route: 1891: Hamburg – Montreal; 1895: Stettin – New York; 1900: Genoa – New York; 1902: Odesa – New York
- Builder: Barclay, Curle & Co, Glasgow
- Yard number: 365
- Launched: 14 November 1890
- Completed: January 1891
- Maiden voyage: 15 April 1891
- Identification: 1891: code letters RJFD; 1915: US official number 213094; 1915: code letters LFHT
- Fate: scuttled 1917

General characteristics
- Type: cargo liner
- Tonnage: 3,144 GRT, 2,042 NRT
- Length: 331.0 ft (100.9 m)
- Beam: 41.1 ft (12.5 m)
- Depth: 19.2 ft (5.9 m)
- Decks: 1
- Installed power: 265 NHP or 1,550 ihp
- Propulsion: 1 × triple-expansion engine; 1 × screw
- Speed: 11 knots (20 km/h)
- Capacity: passengers: 10 × 1st class; 620 × 3rd class
- Crew: 1917: 37

SS Georgia was a passenger and cargo ship that was launched in Germany in 1891 as Pickhuben. The Hamburg America Line acquired her in 1892, and renamed her Georgia in 1895. In 1915 a US company bought her and renamed her Housatonic.

Mostly the ship traded across the North Atlantic. She carried European immigrants to the United States. In 1893 she brought to the US the German exhibits for the World's Columbian Exposition. In 1891 and 1894 she voyaged under charter to Australia. In 1914 she took refuge in the neutral US. In 1917 a German U-boat captured and scuttled her, contributing to increasing diplomatic tension that eventually led the US to declare war on Germany.

Pickhuben's first owner was Dampfschiffs-Reederei „Hansa“ ("Steamship line "Hansa") of Hamburg. DR „Hansa“ should not be confused with the larger and better-known DDG „Hansa“ company of Bremen. HAPAG took over DR „Hansa“ in 1892, and renamed the ship in 1895.

This was the first of two steamships that HAPAG named after the US State of Georgia. The second was launched in 1922, sold in 1936, and renamed in 1937.

== Building ==
Between July 1890 and January 1891, DR „Hansa“ enlarged its fleet with five new single-screw cargo ships from four different builders. Charles Connell and Company in Glasgow built Grimm and Stubbenhuk. Blohm+Voss in Hamburg built Baumwall. Joh. C. Tecklenborg in Bremerhaven built Wandrahm. Barclay, Curle & Co in Glasgow built Pickhuben. All five ships were named after streets in Hamburg. No two ships were exactly the same, but all five were two-masted, three-castle ships of similar in size and appearance. They ranged from 319.3 to 331.0 feet (97.3 to 100.9 m) in length, and from 40.0 to 41.3 feet (12.2 to 12.6 m) in beam.

Barclay, Curle built Pickhuben as yard number 365, launched her on 14 November 1890, and completed her in January 1891. Her registered length was 331.0 ft (100.9 m), her beam was 41.1 ft (12.5 m), and her depth was 19.2 ft (5.9 m). She had berths for 630 passengers: ten in first class, and 620 in third class. Her tonnages were 3,144 GRT and 2,042 NRT. Her single screw was driven by a three-cylinder triple-expansion engine that was rated at 265 NHP or 1,550 ihp, and gave her a speed of 11 knots (20 km/h).

== Pickhuben ==
DR „Hansa“ registered Pickhuben at Hamburg. Her code letters were RJFD. On 15 April 1891 she left Hamburg on her maiden voyage, which was to Quebec and Montreal. On a voyage that summer from Hamburg via Antwerp, she carried mostly Jewish refugees from the Russian Empire. On 4 July, at position 50°09′N 14°25′W, she passed the burning wreck of the British barque Octavia from South Shields. No crew and no boats remained aboard the sailing ship, so it was assumed they had abandoned ship in her boats. Pickhuben kept a lookout for boats and survivors, but found none.

Later that year the Deutsch-Australische Dampfschiffs-Gesellschaft (DADG) chartered her for a voyage to Australia. She left Hamburg on 17 October; called at Antwerp; and took 90 passengers and 4,500 tons of general cargo to Melbourne and Sydney, reaching the latter on 22 December. On 13 January 1892 she left Sydney on her return voyage to Hamburg via Melbourne, carrying cargo that included 6,876 bales of wool.

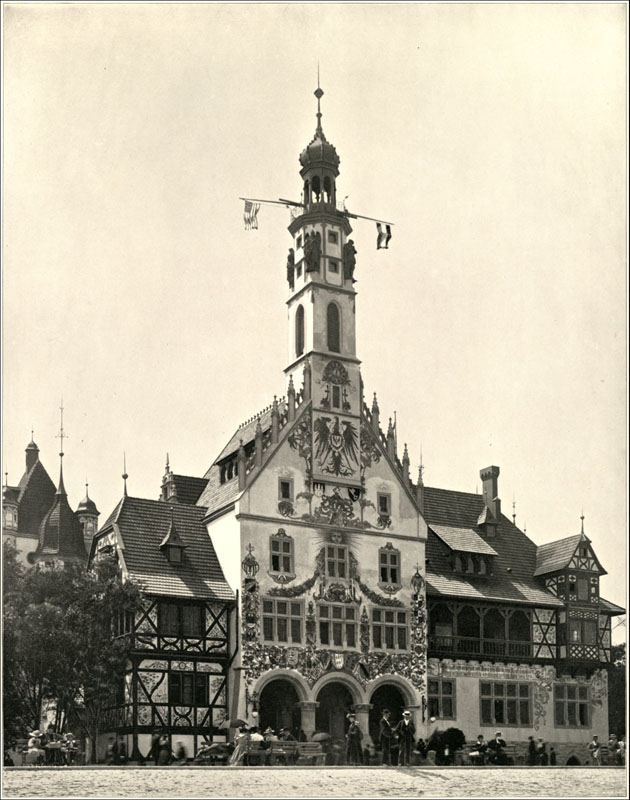
The German pavilion at the World's Columbian Exposition, in which Pickhuben's cargo was exhibited

HAPAG took over DR „Hansa“ in March 1892, and sent Pickhuben on her first voyage to New York on 17 April that year, but thereafter she mostly reverted to the Montreal route. On 8 March 1893 she arrived in Baltimore carrying the German Government's exhibits for the World's Columbian Exposition. They included a railroad coach; exhibits from Saxon woollen mills; electrical products; books; and a gallery of artworks including pictures, bronzes, and statues.

Late in 1894 DADG chartered Pickhuben to go to Australia again, as a substitute for its steamship Erlangen. Pickhuben left Hamburg on 14 September, called at Antwerp and Plymouth, and bunkered at Las Palmas. She sailed via the Cape of Good Hope, and about 80 nautical miles (150 km) from Cape Town she found the British sailing ship Abbie S. Hart flying a distress signal with signal flags. Almost the entire crew of the sailing ship was ill, and her Second Officer had died, so Pickhuben towed Abbie S. Hart to Cape Town. Pickhuben continued her voyage via Port Elizabeth and Adelaide. On 19 November she reached Melbourne, where she collided with the 500-ton hopper barge Fawkner while the tugboat Eagle was towing her along the Coode Canal. Pickhuben reached Sydney on 23 November. On 17 December a court of marine inquiry in Melbourne dismissed charges against Pickhuben's Victorian pilot, and against Fawkner's Captain. Pickhuben loaded 7,344 bales of wool, and in December left Sydney for Hamburg via Melbourne and Antwerp.

== Georgia ==
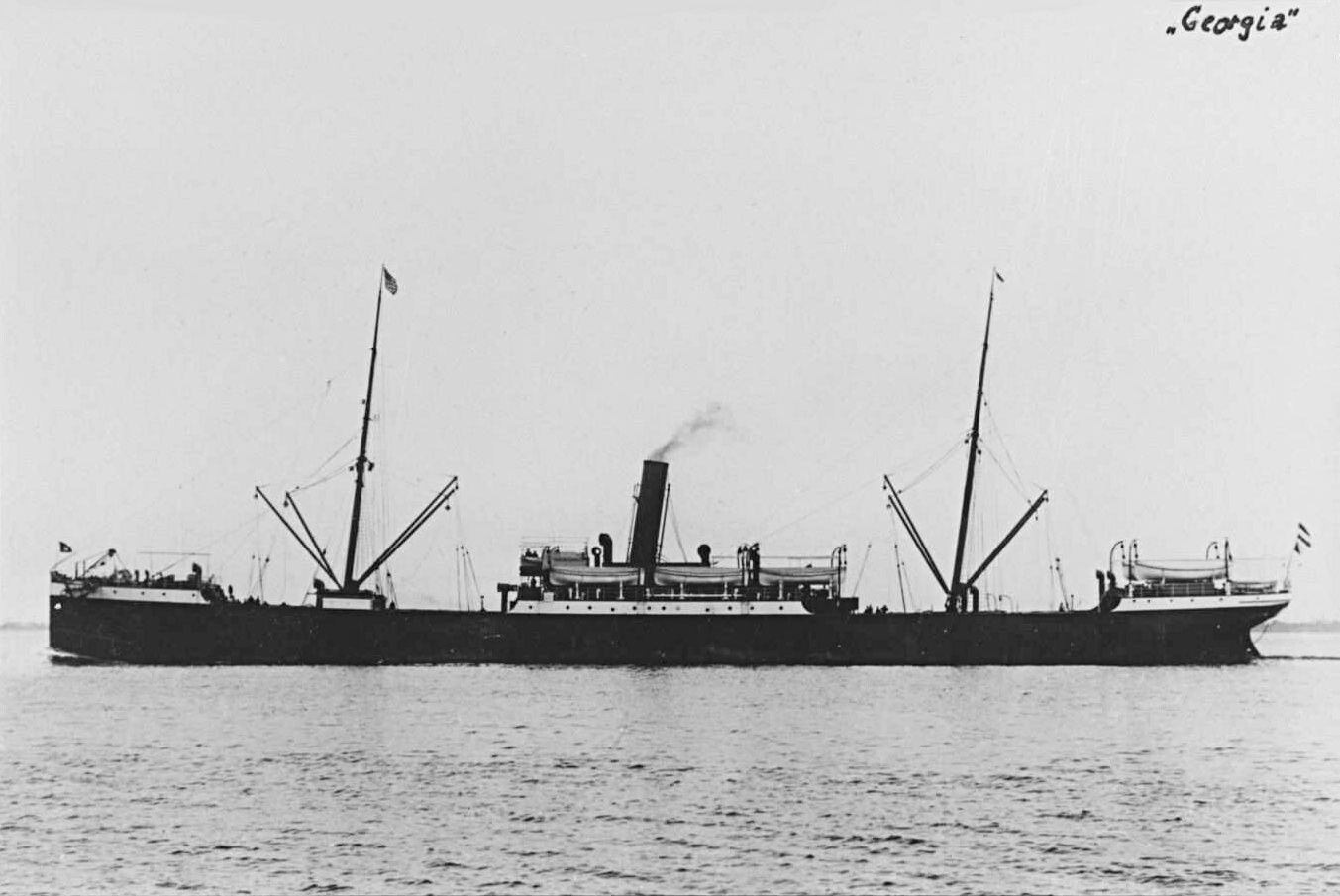
Georgia under way

In 1895 HAPAG renamed the ship Georgia. On 24 April 1895 she sailed from Stettin in Pomerania (now Szczecin in Poland) to New York via Helsingborg and Gothenburg in Sweden, and Kristiansand in Norway. She remained on this route until 11 November 1897. On 2 April 1900 Georgia began her first voyage on the route between Genoa in Italy and New York via Naples. She began her last voyage on this route on 2 March 1902. On 7 May 1902 she began her first voyage on the route between Odesa and New York via Istanbul, Smyrna, and Piraeus. She began her last voyage on this route on 13 March 1904.

== Housatonic ==
When the First World War began in August 1914, Georgia took refuge in New Orleans. On 16 April 1915 the Housatonic Steamship Corporation bought her for $85,000 and renamed her Housatonic. She was registered in New York, her US official number was 213094, her code letters were LFHT, and Edward F Geer was her manager. On 23 February 1916 a British company, Brown, Jenkinson & Company of London, chartered her "for the term of the present war", purely as a cargo ship.

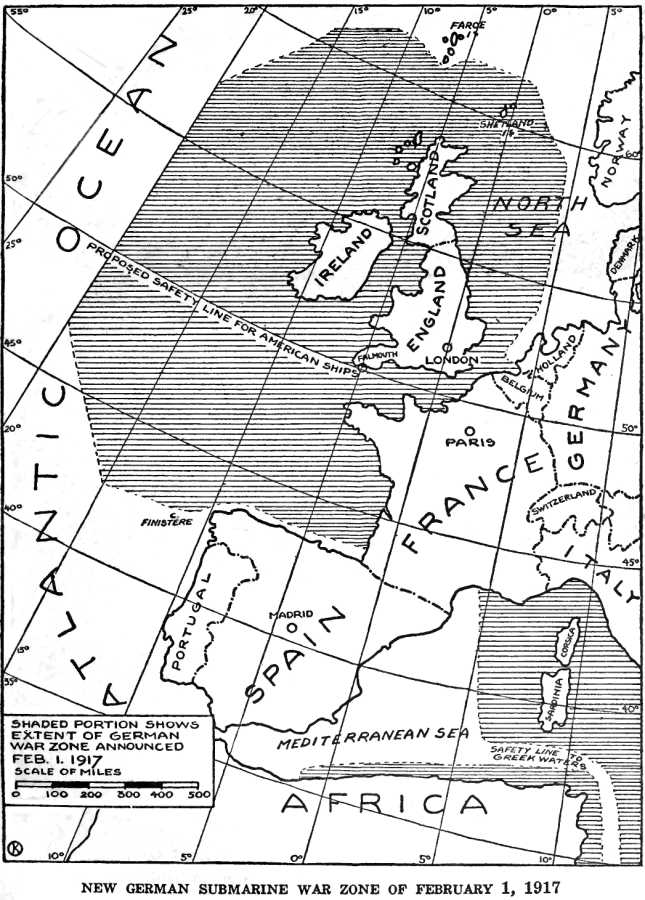
The area with horizontal shading is the German-declared exclusion zone

On 6 January 1917 Housatonic left Galveston, Texas carrying 144,200 bushels of wheat. She called at Newport News, Virginia, where she left on 16 January for Liverpool, England. On 31 January, Germany announced an exclusion zone around the coasts of the Entente Powers. It declared that "Neutral ships navigating these blockade zones do so at their own risk". It imposed conditions on US shipping trading with the Entente Powers, one of which was that the US Government "guarantees that no contraband (according to the German contraband list) is carried by those steamers".

At 10:30 hrs on 3 February U-53 intercepted Housatonic about 20 nautical miles (37 km) southwest of Bishop Rock, Isles of Scilly. The U-boat fired two warning shots at a range of about 250 yards (230 m), forcing Housatonic to heave to. U-53's commander, Hans Rose, ordered Housatonic's US Master, Captain Thomas Ensor, to bring his ship's papers aboard the U-boat for inspection. Rose told Ensor "I find that the vessel is laden with grain for London. It is my duty to sink her." After Ensor protested, Rose replied "You are carrying foodstuffs to an enemy of my country, and though I am sorry, it is my duty to sink you".

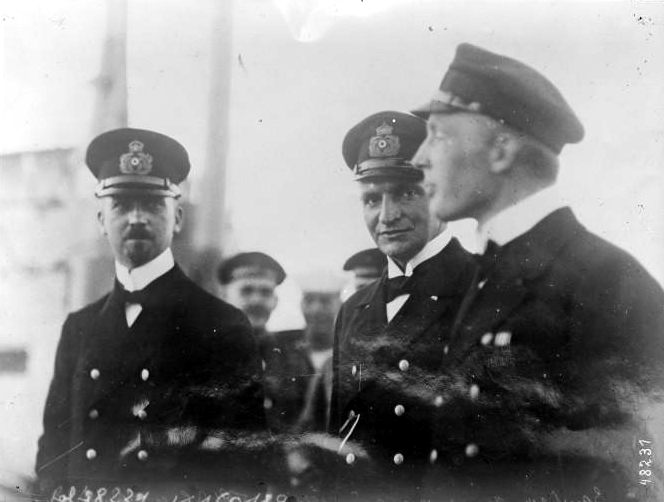
Hans Rose (left) and two of U-53's officers in 1916

A German boarding party came aboard Housatonic. All 37 members of Housatonic's crew abandoned ship in two of her lifeboats: one commanded by Captain Ensor, and the other by her Chief Officer. The boarding party planted explosives in various places below decks, opened her hatches, and knocked off her seacocks. They also took soap from the ship, explaining that the German munitions industry's demand for glycerine had caused a shortage of soap.

U-53 towed the lifeboats clear; there were two large explosions; and Housatonic sank at position 49°35′N 06°08′W. Ensor persuaded Rose to tow the lifeboats toward land. After about two hours, Ensor sighted the Royal Navy naval trawler HMAT Salvator. Rose ordered two shots fired from one of the U-boat's deck guns; satisfied himself that the patrol boat had seen the lifeboats; and ordered U-53 to dive. The patrol boat rescued Housatonic's survivors and took them to Penzance. Ensor returned to the US on the liner Orduña, and his crew followed on the liner Philadelphia.

== Consequences ==
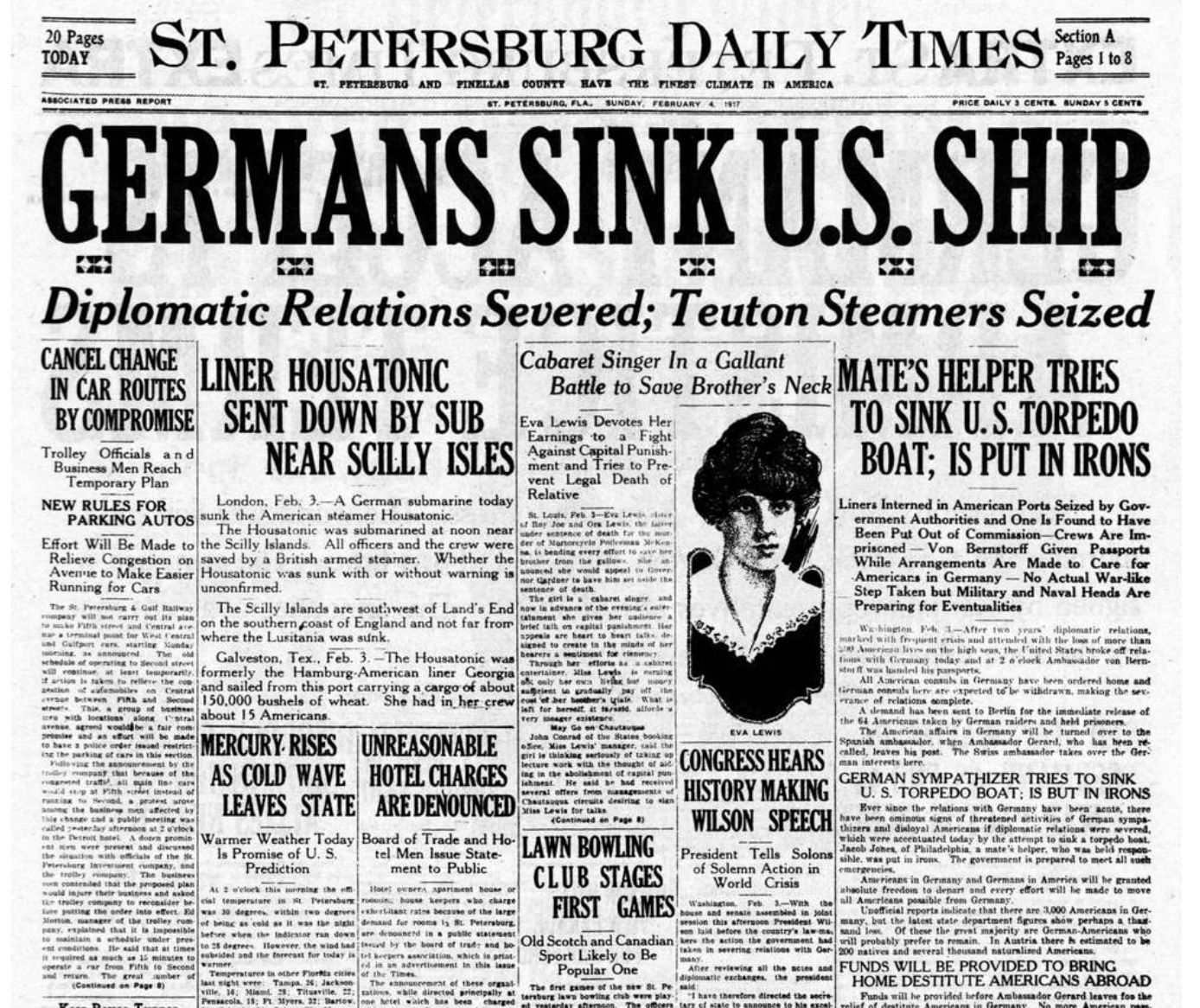
Headline announcing Housatonic's sinking

The US reacted cautiously to Housatonic's sinking. The New York Times noted the courtesy and propriety with which Rose had applied the rules of war. The US Government did not regard Housatonic's sinking as a casus belli. However, U-boats sank two other US ships without loss of life: the schooner Lyman M. Law on 12 February, and steamship Algonquin on 12 March. This led President Woodrow Wilson to address both houses of Congress on 26 February, asking for the power to arm US merchant ships defensively, and to give those ships gunners to crew them.

The US refrained from declaring war against Germany. However, on 16 March 1917 a U-boat sank the US steamship Vigilancia without warning, killing 15 of her crew, including six US citizens. US newspapers called that an act of war, or words to that effect. On 21 March an explosion, caused by either a mine or a torpedo, sank the US oil tanker Healdton, killing 21 of her crew, including seven US citizens.

On 2 April, President Wilson asked Congress to declare war against Germany. During the congressional debate of the proposal, news came that a U-boat had sunk Aztec, causing the death of 28 of her crew, including 11 US citizens. On 6 April, Congress passed the motion by an overwhelming majority, and the US declared war on Germany.

The Housatonic Steamship Company sued for $839,600 damages from the Government of Germany for Housatonic's sinking. Edwin B. Parker, Commissioner of the American–German Claims Commission, heard the case on 14 May 1926. After an argument as to the value of the ship, Parker found in favour of the steamship company, but awarded it only $4,500 plus five percent annual interest from the date of the sinking.

== Bibliography ==
- Bonsor, NRP (1955). North Atlantic Seaway. Vol. I. Prescot: T Stephenson & Sons – via TheShipsList.
- Carlisle, Rodney (July 2007). "The Attacks on U. S. Shipping that Precipitated American Entry into World War I" (PDF). The Northern Mariner. XVII (3): 41–66. doi:10.25071/2561-5467.363. S2CID 247426039.
- Forty-seventh Annual List of Merchant Vessels of the United States, for the Year ended June 30, 1915 (PDF). Washington, D.C.: Department of Commerce, Bureau of Navigation. 1915. p. 131 – via HyperWar.
- Haws, Duncan (1980). The Ships of the Hamburg America, Adler and Carr Lines. Merchant Fleets in Profile. Vol. 4. Cambridge: Patrick Stephens Ltd. ISBN 0-85059-397-2.
- "Housatonic Steamship Company, Inc. (United States) v. Germany" (PDF). Reports of International Arbitral Awards. VII. United Nations: 320–323. 2006 [1926].
- Lloyd's Register of British and Foreign Shipping. Vol. I.–Steamers. London: Lloyd's Register of Shipping. 1891 – via Internet Archive.
- Lloyd's Register of British and Foreign Shipping. Vol. I.–Steamers. London: Lloyd's Register of Shipping. 1896 – via Internet Archive.
- Lloyd's Register of Shipping. Vol. I.–Steamers. London: Lloyd's Register of Shipping. 1914 – via Internet Archive.
