= Joralemon =

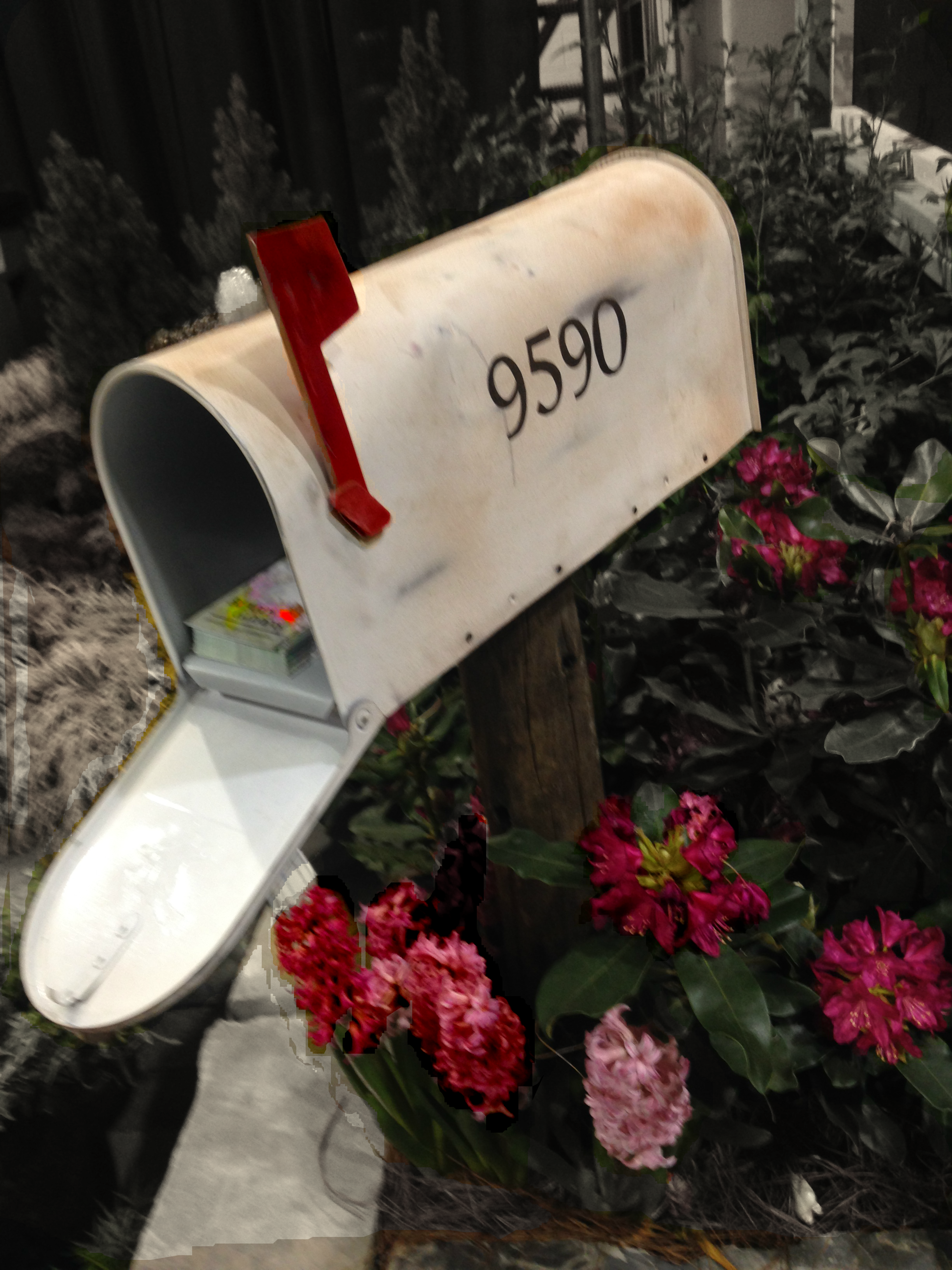
Joroleman mailbox, designed in 1915 by Roy J. Joroleman

Joralemon or Joroleman is a surname. Joralemon Street in Brooklyn, New York was named in 1805 for Teunis Joralemon, the first person to own a brick house in Brooklyn. The classic American mailbox is the Joroleman mailbox, designed in 1915 by a postal employee named Roy J. Joroleman.

Notable people with the surname include:

- Dorothy Rieber Joralemon (1893-1987), American sculptor, artist and writer
- Edgar Eugene Joralemon (1858-1937), American architect
- Ira Joralemon (1884-1975), American mining engineer and popular science writer
- Peter David Joralemon, writer on Olmec religion
- Roy J. Joroleman, designer of the Jorolemon mailbox used in the United States

== See also ==
- Joralemon Street in Brooklyn, named for Teunis Joralemon
  - Joralemon Street Tunnel, part of the New York Subway
  - 58 Joralemon Street, an 1847 house and since 1907 a subway vent
