= SS Healdton =

US-owned oil tanker sunk in 1917

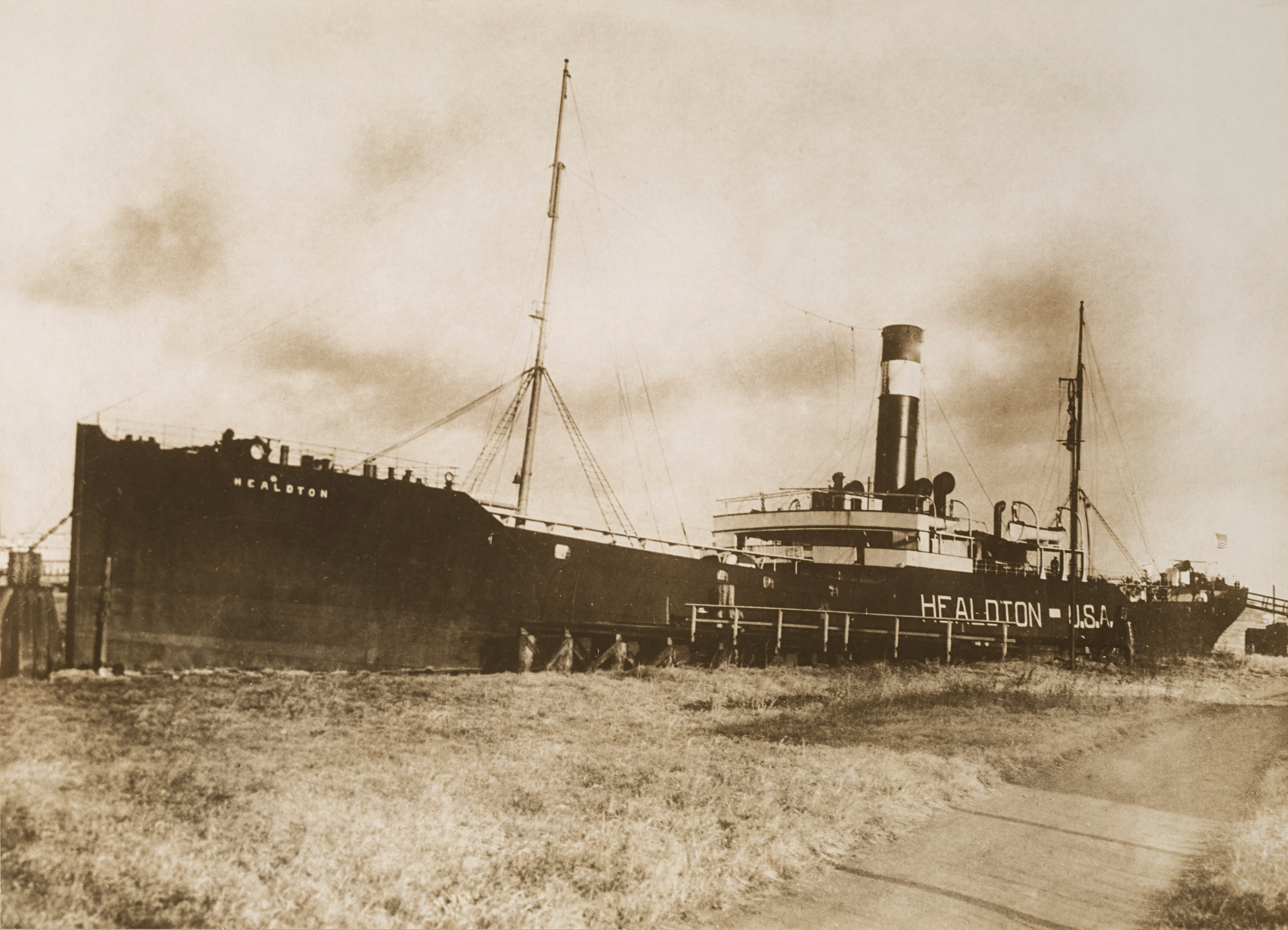
- Healdton in 1916 or 1917

History
- Name: 1908: Purelight; 1916: Healdton
- Namesake: 1916: Healdton, Oklahoma
- Owner: 1908: Purelight SS Co, Ltd; 1911: Pure Oil Co, GmbH; 1916: Standard Oil Co of NJ
- Port of registry: 1908: (German Empire) Hamburg; 1916: (United States) New York
- Builder: Greenock & Grangemouth Dockyard Co, Greenock
- Yard number: 307
- Launched: 1 July 1908
- Completed: August 1908
- Identification: 1908: code letters RPWJ; 1916: US official number 213893; 1916: code letters LFRM
- Fate: sunk by torpedo, 1917

General characteristics
- Type: oil tanker
- Tonnage: 4,489 GRT, 2,723 NRT
- Length: 369.0 ft (112.5 m)
- Beam: 50.9 ft (15.5 m)
- Depth: 27.3 ft (8.3 m)
- Decks: 2
- Installed power: 472 NHP
- Propulsion: 1 × triple-expansion engine; 1 × screw
- Speed: 11 1/2 knots (21 km/h)
- Crew: 41
- Sensors & processing systems: by 1914: submarine signalling
- Notes: sister ship: Pennoil

SS Healdton was an oil tanker that was launched in Scotland in 1908 as Purelight. In 1916 the Standard Oil Company of New Jersey acquired her and renamed her Healdton, after the city of Healdton, Oklahoma.

In March 1917 two explosions sank her off the Dutch coast in the North Sea. 21 of her crew were killed, including seven US citizens. Survivors reported seeing a submarine surface just after they abandoned ship. This is one of several sinkings of US merchant ships that helped to provoke the US to declare war on Germany.

== Building ==
The Greenock & Grangemouth Dockyard Company built the ship as yard number 307 at Cartsdyke in Greenock on the Firth of Clyde. She was launched on 1 July 1908 as Purelight, and completed that August. Her registered length was 369.0 ft (112.5 m), her beam was 50.9 ft (15.5 m) and her depth was 27.3 ft (8.3 m). Her tonnages were 4,489 GRT and 2,723 NRT. She had a single screw, driven by a three-cylinder triple-expansion engine made by John G. Kincaid & Company of Greenock. It was rated at 472 NHP and gave her a speed of 11 1/2 knots (21 km/h).

== Ownership and identification ==
Purelight's first owner was the Purelight Steam Ship Company, Ltd, which seems to have been a one-ship company created to own her. She was registered in Hamburg, and her code letters were RPWJ. By 1911 her ownership had been transferred to the Pure Oil Company, GmbH. At the same time, the Pure Oil Co became the owner of Pennoil, which had belonged to the Pennsylvania Trading Company, AG. Pennoil was a sister ship of Purelight that Greenock & Grangemouth had built in 1903.

By 1914 Purelight was equipped with submarine signalling and wireless telegraphy. When the First World War began in August 1914, Purelight was in Hamburg.

In 1916 the Standard Oil Company of New Jersey acquired her, renamed her Healdton, and registered her in New York. Her US official number was 213893 and her code letters were LFRM.

== Loss ==
In Standard Oil service, the ship had "HEALDTON – U.S.A." painted in white capital letters several feet high, amidships on either side of her black hull. At night the letters were illuminated.

On 26 January 1917 she left Philadelphia with a cargo of 6,200 tons of kerosene for Rotterdam. She contacted Halifax, Nova Scotia, by wireless on 9 February, and left Halifax on 9 March. She was in Bergen in Norway from 17 to 20 March. From Bergen she set course for Rotterdam along a safe channel that the Imperial German Navy had prescribed for neutral ships in the North Sea.

At 20:15 hrs on 21 March she was 23 nautical miles (43 km) north by east of the Terschelling lightship off the Dutch coast, making 10 knots (19 km/h), when an explosion hit her port side amidships. It wrecked her engine room and put her electric generator out of action, so all her lights went out. Then a second explosion hit her bunkers farther aft and started a fire. The ship listed to port and settled by her stern. At least two crewmen were killed by being trapped below decks.

Her crew prepared her lifeboats for lowering. Number 1 boat capsized shortly after being launched, killing all but one of its occupants. Her Master, Captain Charles Christopher, said that the boat was "cut from the tow line prematurely". 12 men abandoned ship with Captain Christopher in Number 2 boat. Seven abandoned ship with the Chief Officer in a third boat. Healdton sank at position 53°53′N 04°28′E about 20 minutes after the explosions. Captain Christopher saw a submarine surface 100 feet (30 m) away, and then dive again. He did not see any identification markings on the submarine. However, he was certain that the two explosions were torpedoes, presumably fired by the submarine that he saw.

The weather was freezing, with hail and snow. None of the men in the open boats was fully clothed. Two members of the engine room were naked, their clothes having been blown or burnt off them. Some others were in their underwear, or had no footwear. Some were suffering from burns. They rigged the sails in the boats and rowed toward Terschelling lightship. The boats became separated in the dark.

Dutch fishing trawlers saw the light from Healdton burning, but mistook it for the Aurora Borealis. However, at 08:00 hrs the next morning the steam trawler Java sighted the sail of Number 2 boat, and went to investigate. The survivors were too hypothermic to maneuver the boat, so Java came alongside, and Dutch trawlermen jumped aboard the lifeboat to keep the two boats together and transfer survivors to Java.The survivors were landed at Terschelling.

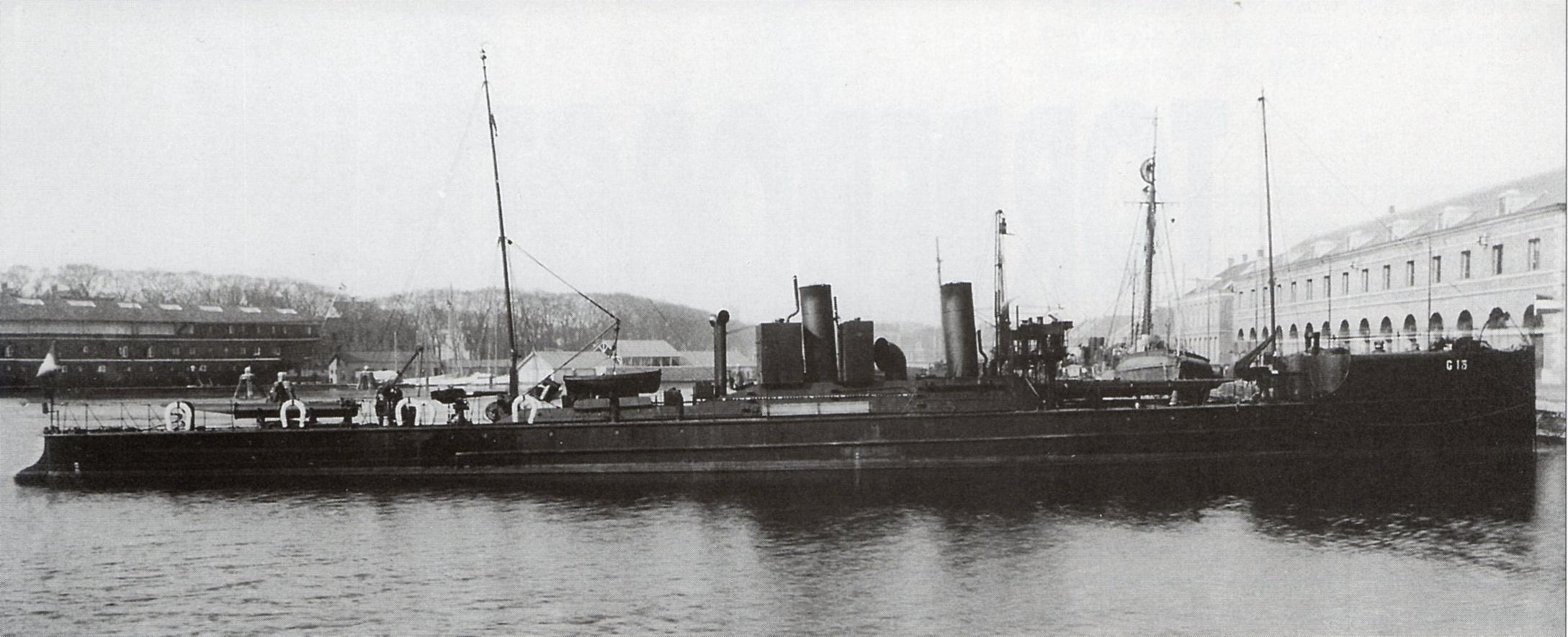
Dutch torpedo boat Hr.Ms. G-13

At about 14:00 hrs on 22 March the Royal Netherlands Navy torpedo boat Hr.Ms. G-13 found the third boat, and landed survivors at Terschelling. Two of the men in the third boat were naked. One had died of hypothermia before the rescue; the other was brought ashore but died in hospital.

Later, the Dutch steam trawler Ocean found Number 1 boat. It had capsized, but one Norwegian crewman had righted it and climbed aboard. His arms and legs were frozen, but he was alive. Ocean landed him at IJmuiden.

A total of 21 Healdton's crew were lost. 13 were US citizens, including the second officer, third officer, and third engineer. The other eight were Norwegian, Portuguese, Spanish, and Swedish. The US Government had insured Healdton for $499,000 under the War Risk Insurance Act. Her sinking was the War Risk Bureau's biggest single loss to date.

== Context and consequences ==
In the Netherlands, Germany was blamed for sinking Healdton. Algemeen Handelsblad said "The unreliability of the German assurances regarding the so-called safe zone is shown by the reports of the crew of the Healdton and the crews of fishing boats". Het Nieuws van de Dag said that if the incident led to war between the US and Germany, it would be Germany's fault.

The New York Times claimed that a newspaper called the Cologne Gazette blamed US President Woodrow Wilson: "President Wilson's advisers know that American ships can enjoy no preferential treatment in the barred zone. It is therefore a wanton game that Mr. Wilson plays." There was no newspaper of that name at that time. However, British and US newspapers sometimes called the Kölnische Zeitung the "Cologne Gazette".

Germany denied sinking Healdton, and declared that she was in a British prohibited zone when she was sunk. Imperial German Navy records do not show any U-boat in the vicinity when Healdton was sunk, whereas Royal Navy records show that the minelayers HMS Angora, Princess Margaret, and Wahine laid a minefield in that part of the North Sea on the night of 18–19 March. However, that does not explain Captain Christopher's statement that he saw a submarine. It is possible for one ship to hit two mines, but it should be borne in mind that the first explosion was amidships and the second was in the after part of the ship.

Healdton left Philadelphia on 26 January, before Germany announced on 1 February that it was resuming unrestricted submarine warfare. She was in Halifax when the United States Senate was debating the Armed Ships Bill, and Progressive Republicans led by Robert M. La Follette filibustered it. She was crossing the North Atlantic from Halifax to Bergen when President Wilson ordered the defensive arming of US merchant ships after the bill had been talked out. In the US there were some who took Healdton's sinking as further justification for the policy to arm merchant ships. It did not change President Wilson's decision, but he added it to the list of incidents to present to the special session of Congress that he had called for 2 April.

Healdton joined a growing list of US merchant ships that had been sunk since 1 February 1917. And the 21 fatalities among her crew joined 15 who were killed when the cargo ship Vigilancia was sunk on 16 March. The next US ship to be sunk was the cargo ship Aztec on 1 April, in which 28 of her complement were killed. Aztec was the first US merchant ship to be defensively armed.

On 2 April, President Wilson asked Congress to declare war against Germany. The news of Aztec's sinking came during the course of the debate. On 6 April, Congress passed the motion by an overwhelming majority, and the US declared war on Germany.

== Bibliography ==
- Bureau of Navigation (1917). Forty-Eighth Annual List of Merchant Vessels of the United States (PDF). Washington, DC: Government Publishing Office – via ibiblio.
- Carlisle, Rodney (2011). "Appendix A: Loss of the Healdton". Sovereignty at Sea: U.S. Merchant Ships and American Entry into World War I. New Perspectives on Maritime History and Nautical Archaeology. Gainesville, FL: University Press of Florida. ISBN 978-0813037622.
- "Germany's acts of war against people of U. S." The Washington Times. Washington, D.C. 7 April 1917. p. 2 – via Library of Congress.
- Lloyd's Register of British and Foreign Shipping. Vol. I.–Steamers. London: Lloyd's Register of Shipping. 1908 – via Internet Archive.
- Lloyd's Register of British and Foreign Shipping. Vol. I.–Steamers. London: Lloyd's Register of Shipping. 1910 – via Internet Archive.
- Lloyd's Register of Shipping. Vol. I.–Steamers. London: Lloyd's Register of Shipping. 1914 – via Internet Archive.
