= Staten Island boat graveyard =

Marine scrapyard in Staten Island, New York

Coordinates: 40.555503°N 74.215738°W

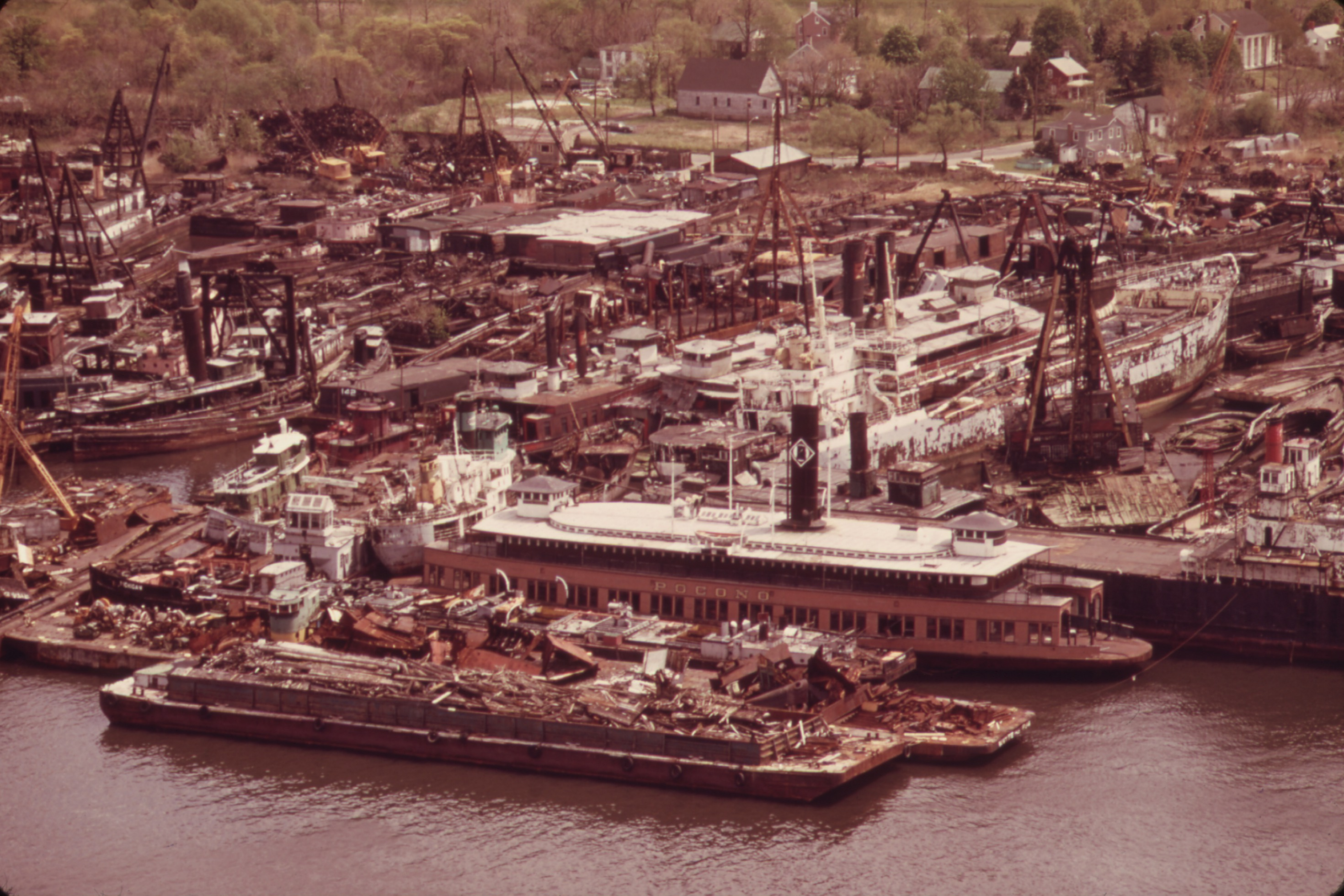
The graveyard photographed in 1973

The Staten Island boat graveyard is a marine scrapyard located in the Arthur Kill in Rossville, near the Fresh Kills Landfill, on the West Shore of Staten Island, New York City. It is known by many other names including the Witte Marine Scrap Yard, the Arthur Kill Boat Yard, and the Tugboat Graveyard. Its official name as of 2014 is the Donjon Iron and Metal Scrap Processing Facility.

== History ==
The scrapyard was founded in the 1930s by John J. Witte and managed by him until his death in 1980. It was then taken over by his son-in-law, Joe Coyne, who described it as similar to an automobile salvage yard, with the boats serving as a source of parts to sell. It is now managed by John Witte's son Arnold. It contains about 100 boats and ships, down from an earlier high of 400.

== Site ==
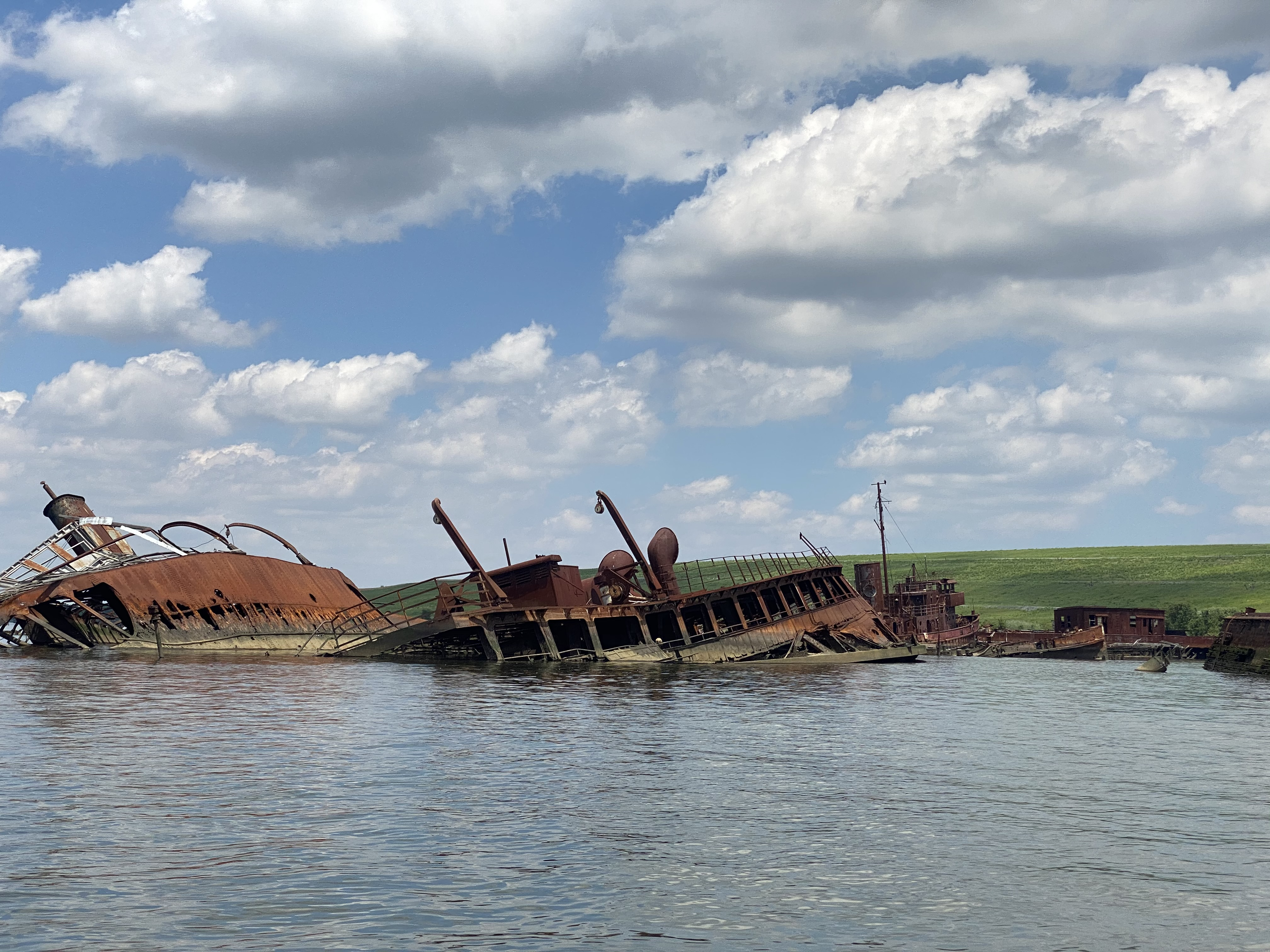
The northern end of the graveyard

The abandoned and decomposing vessels, mostly cargo ships and tugboats, come from "all decades of the 20th century". They sit in the mud and shallow water until they are dismantled or salvaged. Some of them are historic, such that the graveyard has been called an "accidental marine museum". Vessels of historic interest include the submarine chaser USS PC-1264, the first World War II US Navy ship to have a predominantly African-American crew; and the New York City Fire Department fireboat Abram S. Hewitt, which served as the floating command post at the 1904 sinking of the passenger ferry PS General Slocum, a disaster that killed more than a thousand people.

The site is hard to reach and posted with No trespassing signs. Nevertheless, there are some visitors: marine historians explore the area via boats or kayaks, while the decaying ships are a popular subject for photographers and artists. Because of its eerie environment, the location has become a tourist attraction, despite its remote location and difficult accessibility via "a makeshift path of street signs and wood planks into muddy marshland and to the edge of the water where the boats are visible."

== Media ==
A documentary, Graves of Arthur Kill, was filmed in 2012. Scenes from the 2010 thriller Salt were filmed on site.
