= USS Housatonic =

Three ships of the United States Navy

Three ships of the United States Navy have been named Housatonic after the Housatonic River.

- USS Housatonic (1861), was a sloop-of-war launched 20 November 1861 and sunk in the first ever successful submarine attack on a warship by the Confederate submarine H. L. Hunley on 17 February 1864
- USS Housatonic (SP-1697), was built in 1899, commissioned by the US Navy on 25 January 1918 and served as a mine planter in the 3d Naval District until decommissioning 5 August 1919
- USS Housatonic (AO-35), was a tanker acquired by the US Navy 9 January 1942, and decommissioned 11 March 1946
