= Our Mother's Murder =

- Cover of video
- Genre: True crime Drama
- Written by: Richard DeLong Adams
- Directed by: Bill L. Norton
- Starring: Holly Marie Combs; Roxanne Hart; Sarah Chalke
- Music by: Joseph Conlan
- Country of origin: United States
- Original language: English

Production
- Executive producers: Jennifer Alward; Bernard F. Conners; Thomas F. Leahy
- Producer: John L. Roman
- Production location: Vancouver
- Cinematography: Andreas Poulsson
- Editor: Hibah Frisina
- Running time: 92 minutes
- Production companies: Morgan Hill Films; Spinnaker Films; Universal Television Entertainment

Original release
- Network: USA Network
- Release: July 16, 1997

Our Mother's Murder is a 1997 American made-for-TV true crime story, based on the murder of Anne Scripps, heiress to the E. W. Scripps Company. It was directed by Bill L. Norton, and stars Holly Marie Combs and Sarah Chalke who play Alex and Annie, the two eldest daughters of the main character Anne Scripps. The film premiered on July 16, 1997 on the USA Network. The movie was released to video in April 1998.

== Plot ==
In Spring 1989, sisters Alex and Annie Morrell finish prep school, and return home to start college. Their mother, publishing heiress Anne Scripps, welcomes them in her New York mansion. Anne has recently divorced her husband Tony, and is still struggling with the divorce. Nonetheless, she is happy with her new boyfriend, much younger Scott Douglas, a volatile-tempered young man whom she marries only months after their first meeting.

From the start, Alex is uncertain if she should trust Scott, having heard stories about a possible violent past. When Anne announces that she will be having a baby, Scott is distrustful to notice how Alex reacts with doubt about the news. To get rid of her, he claims that he has found marijuana in Alex's bedroom. Alex denies the accusation, but Anne defends her boyfriend, who forces Alex to leave the house.

Shortly after Anne and Scott's baby, Tori's, birth on June 17, 1990, Scott gets violent and beats up Anne for inviting Tony's family for the baby's coming out party. Alex and Annie encourage their mom to leave Scott, but Anne forgives him after a couple of months. By June 1991, she and Scott are a happy couple again. On Alex's 21st birthday, Scott lashes out at Anne again when he finds her smoking in the same room as Tori, and then throws a guest, Stacey, off the stairs. Enraged, Alex dares Scott to hit her, and the police interrupts their fight, only to have Scott lie about the situation. A similar occurrence takes place at a formal ball, where Scott pushes around Anne in front of her friends. As they leave, the fight continues in the car, and Scott eventually throws her out while speeding.

Three months later, Alex's charges against Scott have been dropped, though Anne has filed for divorce and attained a restraining order. The three women move on with their lives, until one night Annie is hit by her date, Mark, while Alex meets a new romantic interest, Jimmy Romeo, though a relationship is postponed due to her focus on her mother. Another setback occurs when Anne is informed that she will have to share custody of Tori. Deciding a reconciliation would be for the better, Anne meets with Scott and believes that he has changed his life for the better.

It turns out, soon, however, that Scott is still as violent as he used to be and threatens to make Tori disappear if she does not stop continuing legal proceedings. The police arrive at the mansion sometime later, though Anne is too scared to file charges. The following day, upon finding out that Scott is stealing her money and planning on running away with Tori, Anne asks for another restraining order. Alex and Annie move in with her again to protect their mother from Scott, and until Alex leaves for the holidays, they are happy again.

One day, Tony calls the mansion, and Scott answers. Believing that Anne will get back with Tony, he announces that the threats are over, and that something has to be done. As soon as Annie leaves, Scott gets drunk and grabs a hammer, killing Anne while she is asleep. Afterwards, he jumps to his death off the Tappan Zee Bridge, over the Hudson River in New York, though his body is found over three months later. The girls are left behind in grief over their mother. Fifteen months later, Alex prepares to marry Jimmy, and in the aftertitles, it is revealed that she gave birth to a baby daughter.

== Cast ==
- Holly Marie Combs as Alex Morrell
- Roxanne Hart as Anne Scripps
- Sarah Chalke as Annie Morrell
- James Wilder as Scott Douglas
- Jonathan Scarfe as Jimmy Romeo
- Michael Buie as Andy Phillips
- Myriam Sirois as Stacey
- Rick Ravanello as Officer Calder
- Alf Humphreys as Officer Derrick
- Bob Osborne as Roger Preston
- Peter Bryant as Booking Officer

== Background ==
A possible movie adaptation of the true crime story was in talks since 1994. Anne Scripps oldest daughters, Alex and Annie, confined their involvement to a single debriefing for the script. Whereas they had no involvement in the production, they supported the message and hoped that the film could help any victims of domestic violence. "I figured if other women saw the film, maybe they'd get out of a bad relationship, and that maybe the courts would wise up," Alex says. "Annie and I thought somebody else's life might be saved." She also noted that the "dramatized abuse against her mother was so mild compared to what really happened.” According to Annie, her mother's sister Mary Scripps "absolutely fumed about the movie .... Mary was afraid it would hurt Victoria,” Anne Scripp's youngest daughter, who was only three years old at the time.

== Reception ==
Kevin McDonough of The Sacramento Bee said the film "unfolds like a horror movie ... its creepy pacing and dark, lurid cinematography are very effective in creating an atmosphere of dread ... and like most horror films, this one has your shouting, 'just get out of the house' at Scripps, as she allows her husband Scott to ruin, and then take her life". Overall, he concluded that "Our Mother's Murder succeeds as both a cautionary tale and solid, entertaining drama".

Steve Reich from The Citizen Register said that although "the movie has good production values and top-level acting, the screenplay takes too long to reach its explosive denouement, which seems almost as if it was tacked on at the last minute ... unfortunately, Our Mother's Murder raises more questions than it answers.” He further opined that "the movie stereotypes Bronxville youths when a character refers to them as 'rich kids who smoke pot' ... the USA Network and Universal Pictures owe the town an apology for this type of slander.”

Virginia Rohan wrote in The Record that while she is not "a fan of docudramas, Our Mother's Murder is a cut above ... the movie is compelling and poignant, and features a lot of familiar reference points, including the Tappan Zee Bridge, from which Scott Douglas jumped to his death". She also noted Roxanne Harts "nicely played" version of Anne Scripps, and pointed out how "her grown daughters struggled valiantly to save their mom.”

== Aftermath ==
On September 25, 2009, Anne's daughter Annie Morrell jumped to her death from the Tappan Zee Bridge. Authorities found a note and believed Annie got out of her car and jumped off the bridge the evening of September 24, 2009. Three days later, her body was found in the Hudson River. Family friends stated that Anne never got over her mother's murder and she had been hospitalized several times for major depression.
