= Tappan Zee Bridge =

Tappan Zee Bridge may refer to:

- Tappan Zee Bridge (1955–2017), a former bridge spanning the Hudson River north of New York City
- Tappan Zee Bridge (2017–present), officially the "Governor Mario M. Cuomo Bridge", the replacement for the 1955 bridge
