= Pier 57 =

Pier in Manhattan, New York

- U.S. National Register of Historic Places
- New York State Register of Historic Places
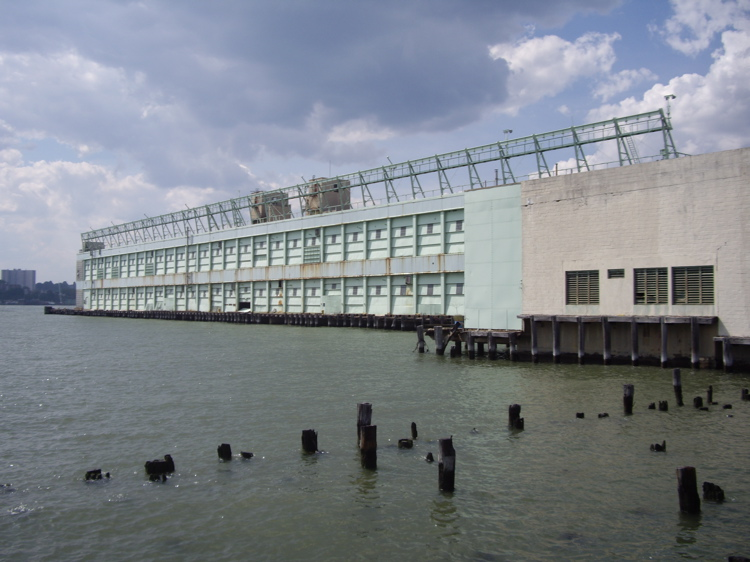

- Location within Lower Manhattan Location within New York City Location within New York Location within the United States
- Location: 25 Eleventh Avenue, Manhattan, New York, US
- Coordinates: 40°44′37″N 74°00′38″W
- Built: 1950–1954
- Architect: Emil Praeger
- NRHP reference No.: 04000821
- NYSRHP No.: 06101.001535

Significant dates
- Added to NRHP: August 11, 2004
- Designated NYSRHP: May 9, 2004

Pier 57 is a pier and building on the east bank of the Hudson River, along the West Side of Manhattan in New York City, New York, United States. Opened in 1954, it sits at the end of 15th Street on Eleventh Avenue (West Side Highway). Pier 57 was designed by Emil H. Praeger and constructed by engineering firm Madigan-Hyland. It includes a headhouse facing the street and a pier shed facing the river, which are arranged to form a two-story, T-shaped building. The pier is underpinned by three submerged, buoyant concrete caissons, which contain the building's basement. The first and second stories contain office space and a food court, and there is a roof garden above. The building is on the National Register of Historic Places.

The original Pier 57, built in 1907, was leased to the Grace Line before it burned down in 1947. Madigan-Hyland, which conducted engineering studies for a replacement pier, found that it was infeasible to reuse the original pier's pilings, so Praeger drew up plans for a floating pier. Construction on the replacement pier began on August 30, 1950, and the caissons were installed in 1952; the new pier was dedicated on March 5, 1954. Though the terminal formally opened in December 1954, it was not used by ships until early 1955. It was originally used by the Grace Line, which vacated the building and pier in 1967, after which the pier remained idle for several years.

From 1972 to 2003, Pier 57 housed the Hudson Pier Bus Depot for the New York City Transit Authority (NYCTA). It was then briefly used as a detention facility during the 2004 Republican National Convention. Cipriani S.A. and Steven C. Witkoff were selected to redevelop the pier as part of Hudson River Park in 2005, but their bid failed. Another developer, Young Woo & Associates (YWA), was selected in 2009 and initially proposed redeveloping the pier as a business incubator and retail space. YWA and RXR Realty began renovating the building with office space for Google, a food hall, a rooftop park, and entertainment venues. The pier reopened in stages between 2020 and 2023.

== Site ==
Pier 57 is located on the east bank of the Hudson River, on 11th Avenue at 15th Street, along the West Side of Manhattan in New York City, New York, United States. Adjacent to it are Little Island at Pier 55 to the south and Chelsea Piers to the north. The Merchants Refrigerating Company Warehouse, an 11-story warehouse listed on the National Register of Historic Places, is immediately across 11th Avenue. Also nearby to the east and southeast are the High Line and Gansevoort Market. The pier, part of a series of sequentially numbered Hudson River piers, was originally adjoined by Pier 56 to the south and Pier 58 to the north.

The pier is surrounded by a walkway on all sides, except for the north and south elevations of the headhouse at the pier's east end. The walkway on the east side of the building is part of Hudson River Park. This walkway, measuring 14 or 15 feet (4.3 or 4.6 m) wide, was originally a truck-loading apron. Wooden pilings surround the pier, functioning as fenders, and rubber buffers are also installed. The pier is flanked by the Hudson River bulkhead wall, a granite-and-concrete structure extending north to 59th Street and south to Battery Park.

== Architecture ==
Pier 57 is the second pier of that name on the site, replacing a structure destroyed in 1947. It was designed by Emil H. Praeger of the engineering firm Madigan-Hyland and was constructed by Madigan-Hyland. It extends 725 feet (221 m) westward into the river. The superstructure of Pier 57 consists of a T-shaped building with two sections: the pier shed facing the water to the west, and the bulkhead shed (or headhouse) facing the street to the east. The pier shed is 725 by 150 feet (221 m × 46 m) across and runs east–west, and the headhouse is 150 by 375 feet (46 m × 114 m) across and runs north–south. (Note: These are the figures given in National Park Service 2004, p. 3, and cited in a New York Times article from January 2, 1950. A New York Herald Tribune article from that date gives conflicting dimensions of 700 by 125 feet (213 by 38 m) for the pier shed and 120 by 375 feet (37 by 114 m) for the headhouse.) Both sections have a concrete basement resting on the riverbed, along with two above-water levels.

=== Exterior ===
==== Façade ====
The headhouse has a steel frame and a brick exterior. The eastern elevation faces 11th Avenue and is divided into three vertical sections, all with door openings at the ground floor. At the central section are tall window openings, along with stainless-steel signage reading "MARINE & AVIATION" and "PIER 57". The outer sections of the eastern elevation have horizontal ribbons of windows. The northern and southern elevations of the headhouse are blank and are clad with stucco or cement plaster; at the time of construction, they adjoined directly onto other buildings on the Hudson River.

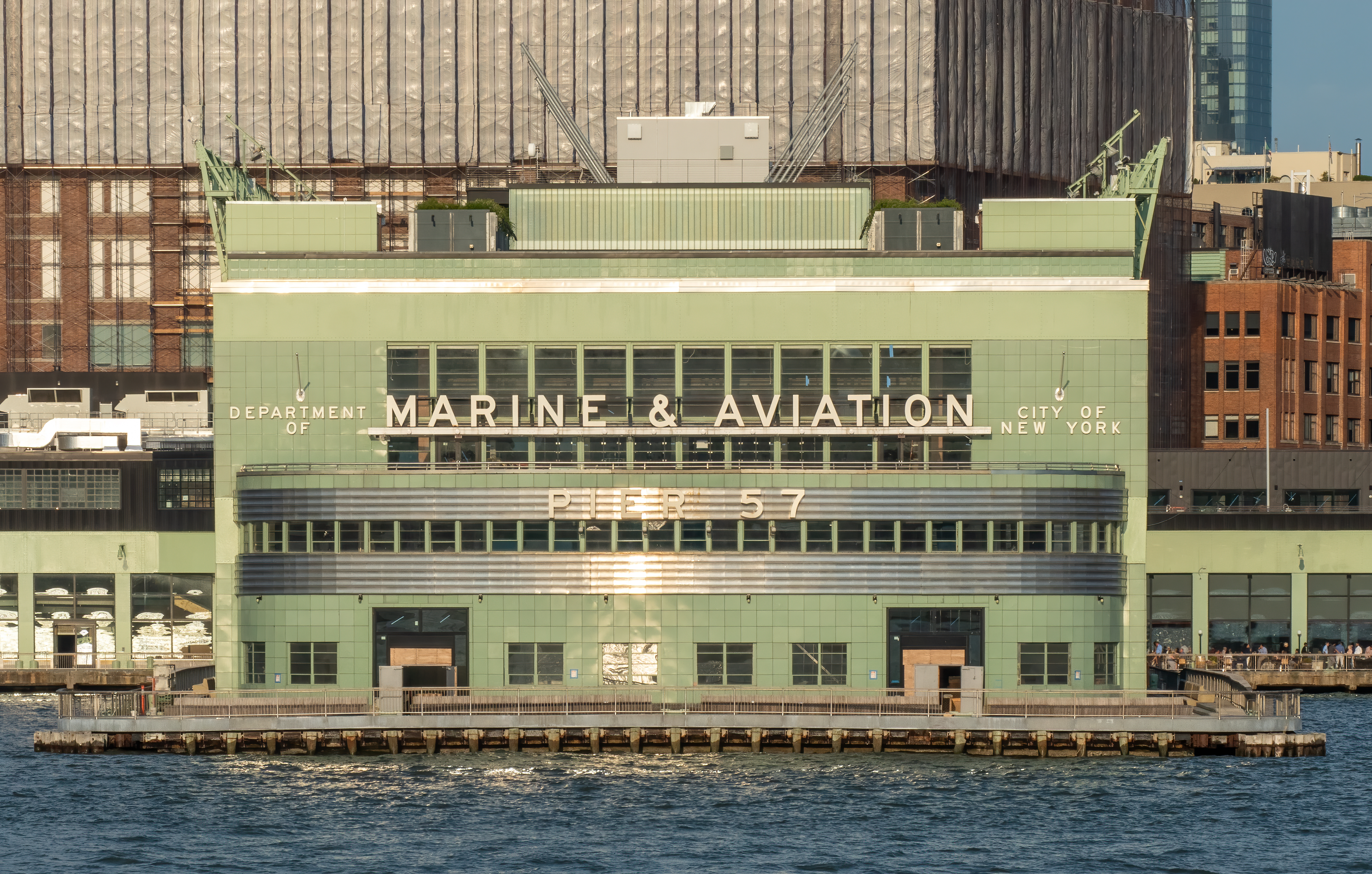
The Hudson River façade of Pier 57's pier shed

The pier shed is a two-story structure with a basement. Its longer north and south elevations are divided vertically into 32 bays. Within these bays were originally 126 vertical-lift truck doors on the first and second stories, along with steel sash windows. The doors were each divided into four sections and operated manually by chains, and had a total surface area of 45,360 square feet (4,214 m^{2}). Following a 2020s renovation, the bays were infilled with 25,000 square feet (2,300 m^{2}) of steel-and-glass façade panels, which slant inward at the top. The bays are each topped with a line of continuous "burton" cargo-handling frames, which allowed freight to be easily transferred to and from ships docked at the pier.

The pier shed's western elevation has a curved, Art Deco-style metal façade with similar stainless-steel signage to the headhouse. The western elevation also had colored lights and a balcony where people could see departing passengers off.

==== Roof ====
The roof was originally used as a heliport, parking lot, and cargo-transfer area, which was used by vehicles and cargo awaiting shipment. At the time of completion in 1954, the pier was the only one in New York City with a parking lot on the roof, although the roof lot was not open for public use. In 2022, a 2.5-acre (1.0 ha) public roof garden opened atop Pier 57, accessible via stairs and elevators from the food hall inside. The roof garden contains lawns and bleacher seats. In addition to serving as a park, the rooftop space collects rainwater and reduces the urban heat island effect caused by nearby buildings. The roof also has a performance venue for screenings of the Tribeca Festival.

=== Interior ===
The entire interior is made of steel and concrete and, from the outset, had a sprinkler system to limit fire damage. Pier 57 is variously cited as having 480,000 square feet (45,000 m^{2}), 560,000 square feet (52,000 m^{2}), or 633,000 square feet (58,800 m^{2}) of space in total. Each story has a 25-foot-high (7.6 m) ceiling. The interior reopened in stages between 2020 and 2023, with a food hall, office space, entertainment venues, and educational facilities.

==== Original configuration ====
Originally, the headhouse's first floor had offices to the east, facing the street, in addition to 14 loading docks for trucks. A stair ascended to the second floor, where there were offices and a hallway. Another passenger-vehicle ramp led between the first and second floors, for people wishing to bid farewell to passengers, avoiding the potential for congestion caused by idling cars. A driveway allowed taxi drivers to drop off and pick up passengers in the headhouse's basement. There were also a baggage conveyor and escalator leading between the basement and first floor.

The pier shed's interior was an open space with steel columns and concrete floors. It also had offices, truck ramps, and freight elevators; the truck ramps were the first to be installed at a pier in the Port of New York. Large trucks were required to use the headhouse's loading docks, while smaller trucks could use the elevators and truck ramps inside. Midway along the pier shed's length, two elevators connected each level. On the second story was a passenger waiting room for the original tenant, Grace Line. The pier shed also had a cafeteria for Grace Line employees, along with a large bathroom for dockworkers. As designed, the basement contained storage warehouses, along with utilities, a garage, pumps, and heating system. Elevators throughout the building served the basement.

==== Post-redevelopment ====
Interior of the food hall

Following the 2020s redevelopment, the building has contained a food hall, which was built with 15 or 17 stalls. The food hall, spanning 16,000 square feet (1,500 m^{2}), includes a culinary education and demonstration venue called Platform; both spaces are operated by James Beard Foundation. At the west end of the pier shed is a black box theater known as Horizon Hall. A second theater is located in the former passenger waiting room on the pier shed's second floor. There is a 32,000-square-foot (3,000 m^{2}) restaurant and performance space for City Winery, which contains beams salvaged from the venue's previous location. Next to the food hall is a 7,400-square-foot (690 m^{2}) "living room" facing the southern elevation. Also within Pier 57 is a double-height atrium called the Visitor Landing, with 54 skylights, along with a series of interactive activities known as Discovery Tank.

Google also occupies about 350,000 square feet (33,000 m^{2}) of office space, which includes lounges, a dining terrace, meeting spaces, and workspaces across three floors. Google operates three environmental technology classrooms, which are leased out to nonprofit and neighborhood groups. One of the former vehicular ramps is used as a incline elevator; this makes Pier 57 one of two locations in New York City with incline elevators, along with the New York City Subway's 34th Street–Hudson Yards station.

=== Caissons ===
The original pier had been supported by 3,000 pilings made of timber. (Note: Figures of 2,300 or 4,000 pilings have also been cited.) The pilings had not descended to bedrock and could not support the weight of the replacement pier. They could also not be removed because the resulting holes would have destabilized the silt in the riverbed. The underlying bedrock is between 100 and 400 feet (30 and 122 m) below the riverbed, so it was also infeasible to drill a conventional pile down to bedrock. The current pier is instead supported by three submerged buoyant concrete caissons (also referred to as pontoons or concrete boxes). Before the caissons were built, the old pilings were severed above the level of the riverbed, approximately 34 feet (10 m) beneath mean low water. The tips of the pilings were covered with a layer of gravel. The only pilings used in the current pier are the fenders around the caissons.

The caissons are laid out in a T-shape, with the two caissons of equal dimensions laid out from west to east, and the third from north to south. The two largest concrete caissons by volume are 360 feet (110 m) long, 82 feet (25 m) wide, and 33 feet (10 m) high and sit under the pier shed. The third, underneath the headhouse, is 375 feet (114 m) long, 82 feet (25 m) wide, and 25 feet (7.6 m) high. (Note: The caissons are variously cited as measuring 350 ft × 150 ft × 74 ft (107 m × 46 m × 23 m) across.) Inside each caisson are interior girders measuring up to 3.5 feet (1.1 m) thick. The two larger caissons also have 3-inch-thick (7.6 cm) steel meshes embedded into their concrete foundations. Each caisson's roof has massive girders measuring 150 by 2 by 9 feet (45.72 by 0.61 by 2.74 m) across, spaced every 20 feet (6.1 m), which support the first-floor deck above. The caisson walls measure 2 feet (0.61 m) thick and are attached to the riverbed using steel dowels that are spaced every 40 feet (12 m). Each dowel measures 30 inches (760 mm) across and is driven into the riverbed. The caissons' interiors accommodate all of the pier's subaquatic spaces, including storage areas, ramps, elevators, and driveways.

The design principle is based on similar structures created as part of the American military effort in World War II, including temporary breakwaters that were used during the D-Day invasion in Normandy. The caissons weigh up to 27,000 short tons (24,000 long tons; 24,000 t), but they float because they weigh less than the 47,000 short tons (43,000 t) of water that they displace. They are capable of supporting weights of about 97,000 short tons (87,000 long tons; 88,000 t). Their buoyancy supports 90% of the pier's weight, (Note: A 1954 article in New York Herald Tribune cites a different figure of 80% for the proportion of the pier's weight supported by the caissons.) while the riverbed supports the rest.

== History ==
The first Pier 57, built in 1907 for $1.2 million, (Note: Equivalent to $29.4 million in 2024) was made of wood and measured 1,000 feet (300 m) long. It had what the Scientific American described as a "fireproof" metal shed, which measured 100 by 800 feet (30 by 244 m) across. The original pier was part of the Chelsea Piers complex between piers 54 and 62, served by ocean liners. Pier 57 was occupied by the French Line before being leased to the Grace Line in 1936.

=== Development ===
==== 1947 fire ====
On September 29, 1947, a six-alarm fire engulfed the pier, destroying both the pier itself and the cargo loaded there; at the time, no one was on the pier. Originating in the structure's wooden support piles, the fire caused damage estimated at $5 million, (Note: Equivalent to $55.0 million in 2024) far more than what the pier's $2 million (Note: Equivalent to $22.0 million in 2024) insurance policy covered. The conflagration was variously attributed to the use of creosote or another oil substance as coating for the pilings, or the accumulation of fuel in the wooden beams, and may have been set accidentally by a passing tugboat dumping ashes into the river. Over 200 firefighters were dispatched to the blaze, along with numerous fireboats including the John J. Harvey, and over a hundred firemen were injured.

The fire lasted several days, and only about 75 feet (23 m) of the original pier remained standing afterward. While the fire was being extinguished, part of the pier structure collapsed on the firefighting boat William L. Strong. Part of the façade collapsed onto the street on October 1, injuring multiple people, including a marine surveyor who lost his leg and subsequently received the highest-ever personal-injury judgment returned by the Manhattan Supreme Court at the time. A safe from the pier fell intact into the water, but its contents were later stolen. Following the fire, the Grace Line was forced to relocate to Pier 45, then to Pier 56. As a direct result of the fire, the city government devised ways to make the city's other piers more fire-resistant, including the creation of fire-hose openings within the floors of existing piers.

==== Design ====
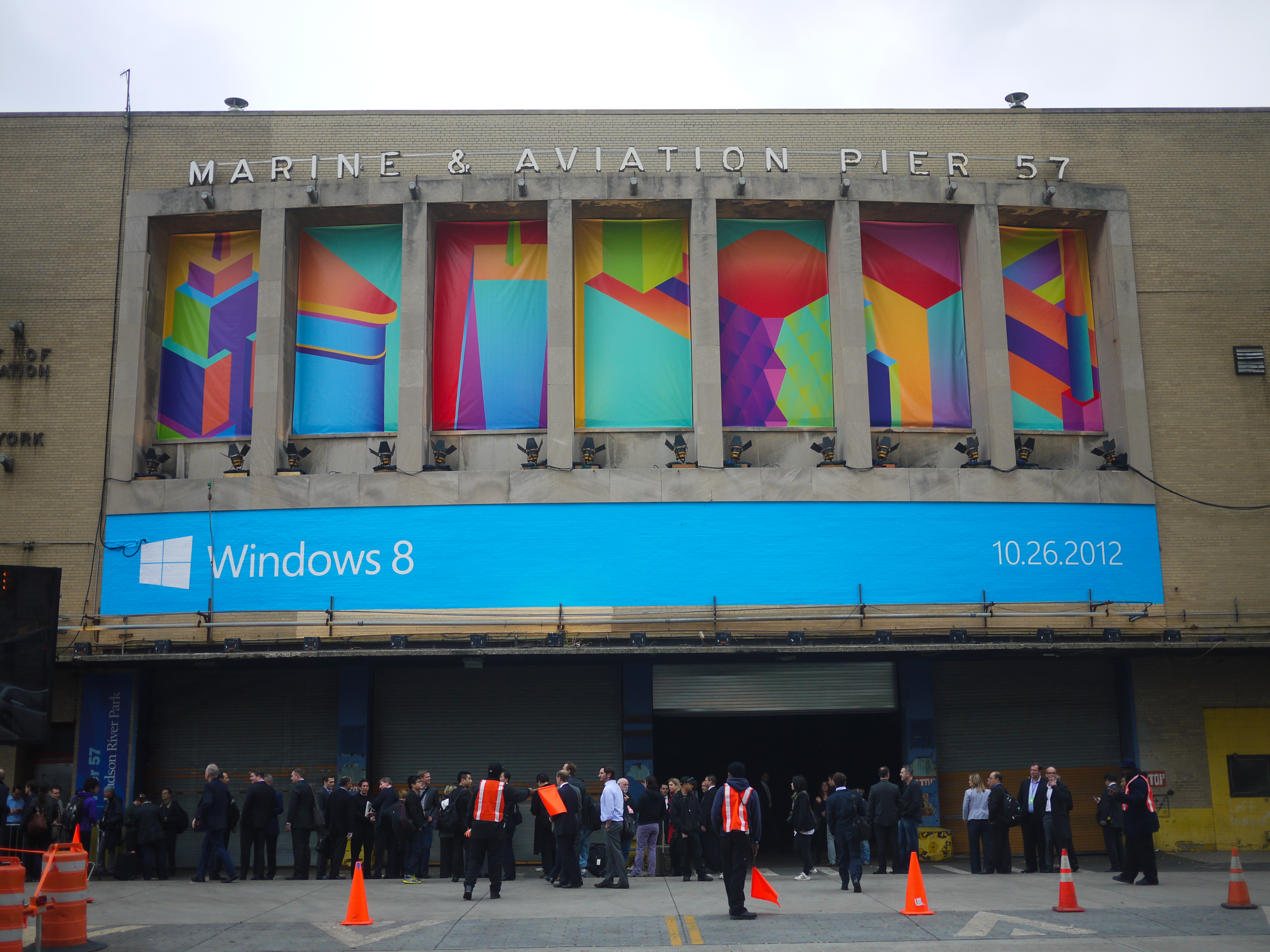
The front façade of Pier 57 in 2012

After the fire, the city government also began looking into rebuilding Pier 57, and work on demolishing the old pier continued through 1948. The city originally anticipated that the Grace Line would fund the total cost of reconstruction, estimated at about $5 million. In June 1948, the New York City Board of Estimate agreed to cancel Grace Line's lease on the old pier, provided the company pay a $1.72 million settlement for the new pier. (Note: Equivalent to $17.9 million in 2024) This amount included $240,000 to clear debris from the site. (Note: Equivalent to $2.6 million in 2024) The city also allocated $1.36 million for the pier, (Note: Equivalent to $14.2 million in 2024) and other sources would provide another $1.6 million. (Note: Equivalent to $16.6 million in 2024) This was part of a wider-ranging initiative to reconstruct several piers in the Port of New York.

Due to municipal staffing shortages, the city hired an outside firm, Madigan-Hyland, to conduct engineering studies for the new pier. In August 1949, Madigan-Hyland was hired to design the pier for $175,000. (Note: Equivalent to $1.8 million in 2024) Madigan-Hyland calculated that the existing pilings could not be reused, and one of its employees, Emil Praeger, drew up plans for a pier floated onto fireproof concrete caissons. Gustave Birger Andreen, another engineer at Madigan-Hyland, helped draw up the specifications for the caissons. The design changes increased the reconstruction cost to $5.7 million, (Note: Equivalent to $59.4 million in 2024) though Marine and Aviation Commissioner G. Joseph Minetti said this was still less than what a rebuilt pier of conventional design would have cost.

Plans for the floating pier, containing a T-shaped building with a bulkhead to the east and a pier shed to the west, were announced in January 1950. As proposed, the pier was to include 175 parking spaces underground and 450 spots above, along with a series of truck ramps. A heliport was later added to the design; Marine and Aviation Commissioner Edward F. Cavanagh Jr. said the roof was strong enough to accommodate helicopters of all sizes. Cavanagh approved preliminary plans for the new pier in March 1950, allowing Madigan-Hyland to proceed with the final plans. By then, the United States Army Corps of Engineers had also granted a permit for Pier 57's construction.

==== Construction ====
The building's cornerstone

Construction began on August 30, 1950, after O'Brien Brothers Inc. and Quist Construction Company received a $528,000 contract (Note: Equivalent to $5.5 million in 2024) to cut off the tops of the existing pilings. By November 1950, the city government was soliciting bids for the three concrete caissons. The city received only two offers, both of which came more than a million dollars over the city's budget. After several rounds of negotiations, in February 1951, the Board of Estimate approved a $5.6 million contract (Note: Equivalent to $54.1 million in 2024) with a joint venture of Corbetta Construction Company and Merritt–Chapman & Scott. The board also approved an additional $1.1 million appropriation to fund the contract, (Note: Equivalent to $10.6 million in 2024) which the companies signed later that month. In conjunction with Pier 57's development, the façades of existing piers 53 through 62 (dating from 1910) were also rebuilt to complement the new pier's design.

Corbetta and Merritt–Chapman & Scott leased a lake at Grassy Point near Haverstraw, New York, north of the city, in April 1951. (Note: Sources disagree on whether the lake was 30 miles (48 km), 35 miles (56 km), or 38 miles (61 km) north of the city; the distance varies based on whether it is calculated from Pier 57 itself or elsewhere in the city.) The lake had either 210 million US gallons (790×10^{6} L) or 350 million US gallons (1,300×10^{6} L) of water and needed to be drained. The contractors built a dike separating the lake from the river, drained the lake, flattened the bottom of the resulting pit, and built the caissons within the pit. It took three weeks to drain the lake, in part because fish were either stranded in the pit or clogged the drainage pipes; a sewage system also had to be installed to prevent the lake from refilling. The caisson contractors built the caissons in assembly line fashion, installing two cranes to handle the delivery of steel and concrete. A steel yard was set up adjacent to the under-construction caissons. Marine and Aviation engineer Raymond C. Wood, who had been overseeing the reconstruction of the Staten Island Ferry's Whitehall Terminal, was reassigned to oversee Pier 57's caissons in mid-1951.

City officials viewed models of the new pier in late 1951, and the caissons were nearing completion by June 1952. The pit in Grassy Point was flooded beginning on July 17, and the dike was torn out the next week, allowing tugboats to tow the caissons down the river. Due to the difficulty of navigating the caissons through the Hudson River's shallow waters, they were towed one at a time, at two-week intervals. The first caisson was floated down starting on July 29, 1952, and was set in place on August 5. The process of installation involved floating the caissons into place at high tide, then locking the caissons to the riverbed using cables. Work was delayed slightly after laborers went on strike to demand wage increases, and the last caisson was not floated down until September 30. The contractors then re-drained the pit so they could construct caissons for the Tappan Zee Bridge.

Pier 57's pier shed and headhouse were built after the caissons had been towed into place. Corbetta received a $3.9 million (Note: Equivalent to $36.9 million in 2024) contract in December 1952 to erect the pier shed and headhouse. Slightly over a month later, the Board of Estimate voted in January 1953 to lease the new pier to the Grace Line for eight years at a cumulative $2 million. A flash fire in one caisson that March, ignited by gasoline fumes, killed two workers and injured a third. By July 1953, almost all substructure work on the caissons was complete, and the superstructure's construction was about to begin. The city also solicited bids for the installation of utilities at Pier 57. By then, it was one of two new city-operated piers under construction (out of nine that city officials proposed in 1950), and Pier 57 accounted for nearly all of the $12.75 million (Note: Equivalent to $119.0 million in 2024) spent on these piers to date. The superstructure's construction was delayed by five months due to steel delivery issues. By January 1954, the superstructure was nearly complete; interior work began the next month.

=== 1950s and 1960s: Maritime use ===
==== Opening and early years ====
Walkway outside Pier 57

The pier was dedicated on March 5, 1954, at a ceremony attended by Cavanagh and Mayor Robert F. Wagner Jr., and the Concrete Industry Board held a luncheon in the center caisson that June to celebrate the caissons' completion. The official opening was postponed while finishing touches were installed. The pier officially opened on December 29, 1954, with a ceremony attended by Marine and Aviation commissioner Vincent O'Connor; Grace Line president Cassius C. Mallory; and Wagner. O'Connor and Mallory inaugurated the heliport at the opening ceremony. Final construction costs totaled $12 million, (Note: Equivalent to $11.1 million in 2024) making Pier 57 the largest dock-building effort the New York City government had ever carried out. The rooftop parking lot allowed the Grace Line to give up four existing parking lots in the area.

The pier was originally supposed to begin receiving vessels in mid-January 1955, as its electrical work was incomplete; in the meantime, the structure was used only for storage. The opening was delayed several weeks because the International Longshoremen's Association (ILA) and the Grace Line could not agree on who to appoint as the pier's hiring agent. The opening, rescheduled for March 7, was delayed again when ILA-affiliated dockworkers briefly went on strike to protest the selection of hiring agent. The terminal ultimately opened on March 8, 1955, when the liner Santa Barbara became the first vessel to dock there. Even after Pier 57 opened, labor disputes continued over the Grace Line's decision to hire non-ILA members.

The pier functioned as a terminal for shipping and storage of cargo. However, increases in containerization and the concurrent Jet Age-era rise of commercial aviation had decreased the Hudson River piers' traditional passenger and freight business, to the extent that the historian Marc Levinson called Pier 57 "obsolete before it opened". In September 1955, the television personality Arthur Godfrey landed a helicopter on Pier 57 as a stunt; he received a scroll commemorating him as the first person to land a helicopter at the West Side Airlines Terminal, over 1 mile (1.6 km) away. The pier's presence prompted the Italian Line, which occupied Pier 56 to the south, to cancel its lease at that pier, citing the narrowness of the berth between the two piers. Pier 57 was also initially not financially self-sustaining. In November 1956, Grace Line officials rededicated Pier 57 as part of the Grace Line Terminal, which also included Pier 58 immediately to the north. The pier had so much unused space that, in 1958, the Grace Line built a 34-by-16-by-1-foot (10.36 by 4.88 by 0.30 m) tank in the center caisson to test out model ships.

==== Abandonment and reuse proposals ====
Grace Line had moved out of Pier 57 by 1967.

By the 1960s, the city government was considering proposals to redevelop the piers along the Hudson River. All of the Grace Line Terminal's Central American and western South American services were relocated from the neighboring Pier 58 to the Port Newark–Elizabeth Marine Terminal in New Jersey in December 1966. At the time, the Grace Line was still operating cargo services and Caribbean services from Pier 57. The Grace Line ultimately sold its shipping business in 1967, and by later that year, the company was out of Pier 57 as well, having relocated the pier's remaining passenger services to Pier 40. By then, with the rise of containerization, shipping activity in the Port of New York was increasingly moving to New Jersey, and there was little demand for a traditional freight pier such as Pier 57.

The rock band Blue Cheer recorded an LP at the unused pier in 1968. The next year, the production studio Feller Scenic Studio contemplated leasing Pier 57 for productions, but the city rejected the agreement, reportedly because of pressure from the ILA. At the time, the ILA anticipated that the pier could still be reactivated for maritime use if needed. In September 1970, as part of a cultural festival involving multiple abandoned piers, Mayor John Lindsay proposed converting Pier 57 into a temporary theater. The ILA picketed the festival, as did neighborhood residents; Lindsay eventually moved the festival to Central Park. By then, Manhattan's meatpacking industry was considering converting the unused pier into a refrigeration facility for meats from Oceania.

=== 1970s to early 2000s: Bus depot ===
Exterior of Pier 57 as seen from 11th Avenue

The Metropolitan Transportation Authority (MTA) was also interested in using Pier 57 as a bus depot by c. 1970, and MTA subsidiary New York City Transit Authority (NYCTA) reached an agreement in December 1971 to lease the pier. In response, ILA picketers blockaded the pier. NYCTA workers with the Transport Workers Union, who refused to break a picket line, followed suit until both the New York Supreme Court and a mediator ruled that the NYCTA could use the pier. Local residents protested the garage as well, citing environmental concerns, and City Council President Sanford Garelik claimed the bus depot would endanger pedestrian safety and make it difficult to reuse the pier for maritime purposes. The ILA unsuccessfully attempted to secure an alternate use for the pier, and in September 1972, the NYCTA took over, converting Pier 57 into the Hudson Pier Bus Depot. As configured, the pier could fit 225 buses. The NYCTA promised to vacate the pier if a maritime tenant was found, and as such, it operated the pier under a series of short-term leases.

Though the NYCTA wanted to renovate Pier 57 to make it more suitable for bus storage, the Board of Estimate vetoed a $2.6 million appropriation intended for that purpose in late 1972. (Note: Equivalent to $14.7 million in 2024) Manhattan borough president Percy Sutton claimed that the NYCTA was trying to obtain a permanent agreement for Pier 57 by not giving up the site of the Amsterdam Depot in Manhattanville, where a hospital had been proposed. By the late 1970s, the pier was proposed for demolition or abandonment as part of the Westway highway project, which would have cut through the pier's site. As part of Westway, a replacement bus depot would have been constructed elsewhere in Manhattan, funded by the federal government. By 1982, the MTA was considering the new bus depot on 11th Avenue above the West Side Yard. Westway was ultimately canceled in 1985. Pier 57 and its neighbors were severely dilapidated during the 1980s, and the adjacent piers sat empty. The pier lacked sufficient storage space for buses, and it was still occupied under a short-term lease.

The MTA contemplated replacing the Pier 57 depot in 1987 with a floating bus depot, which would have been supported by several pontoons and cost $50 million. (Note: Equivalent to $118.1 million in 2024) By then, vandals frequently threw materials and equipment from Pier 57 in the water. In the 1990s and early 2000s, there were proposals to move Midtown Manhattan's flower district (centered on Sixth Avenue and 28th Street) to Pier 57. Ultimately Pier 57 continued to house a bus depot until 2003, at which point the MTA was legally obligated to find a new bus depot. The final buses were relocated on September 7, 2003. Pier 57 had remained little-changed since the 1970s, even while neighboring piers had been redeveloped. Asbestos and other unsafe conditions remained in the pier, and some of the building's windows had been boarded up.

=== Mid- and late 2000s ===
When the bus depot closed, the adjacent Hudson River Park was being created on the waterfront. The park's operator, the Hudson River Park Trust (HRPT), had been selected to redevelop the pier. The redevelopment of Pier 57 and nearby Pier 40 were intended to produce income for Hudson River Park, which received no city or state funds. Income from the two piers and the Chelsea Piers sports complex was to pay for expansions and other expenses. Pier 57 sat between the neighborhoods of Chelsea and Greenwich Village, so the trust saw Pier 57's redevelopment as a major part of its plan. The Hudson River Park Act, the 1998 legislation that had established the park, initially limited what types of commercial development could take place at Pier 57, and the trust did not allow most commercial uses or any residential or hotel space within its parkland.

==== 2004 RNC detention center ====
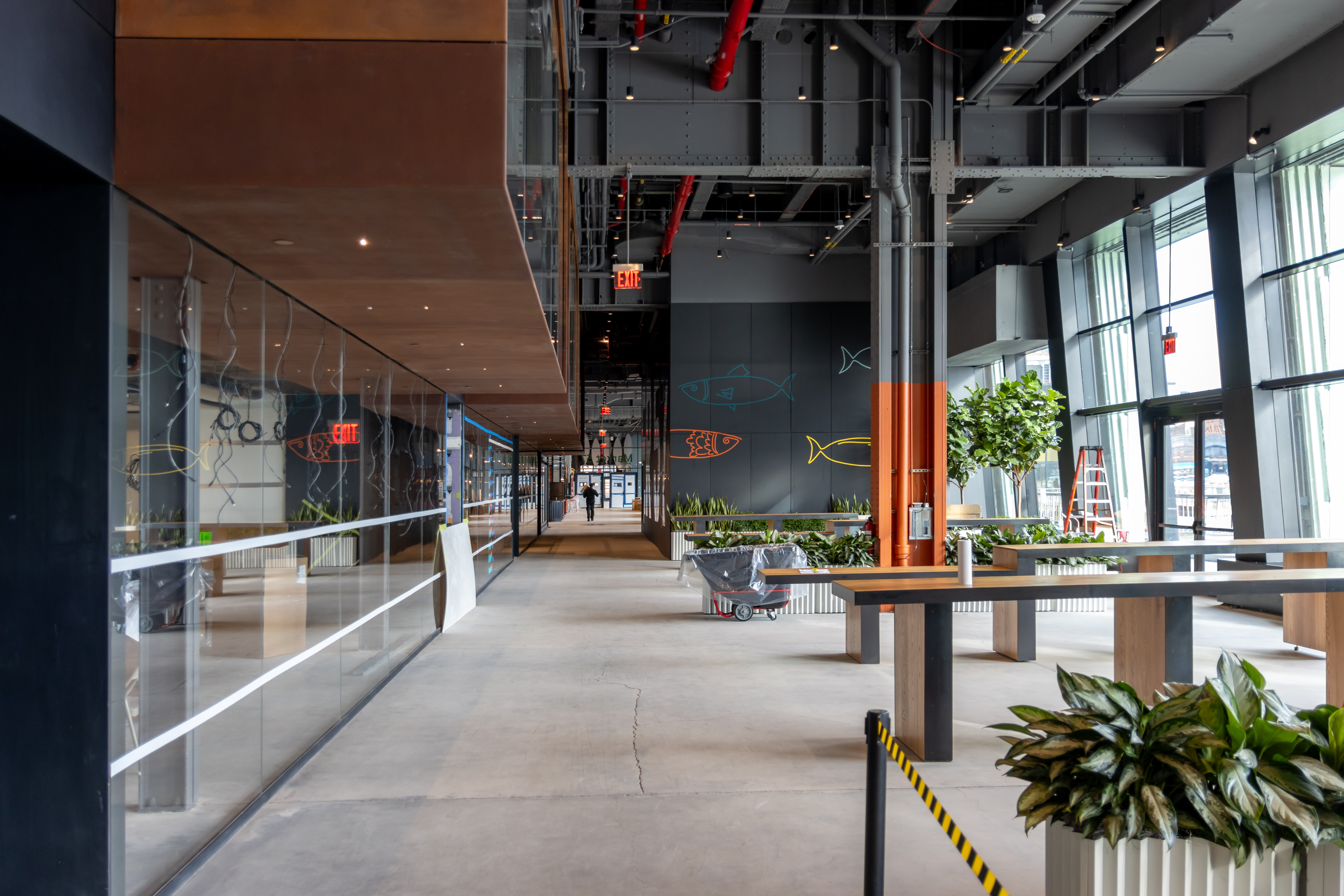
The interior of Pier 57 in 2023

In June 2004, the Port Authority Police Department (PAPD) requested permission to make "relatively minimal modifications" to use Pier 57 as a makeshift detention and processing center for the 2004 Republican National Convention (RNC). The HRPT approved the PAPD's request the next month. Chain-link fences, toilets, and benches were added to accommodate the detention center, and 10-by-20-foot (3.0 by 6.1 m) pens were set up to fit tens of detainees at once. Oil and chemicals remained on the floor, but testing found no evidence of airborne asbestos particles.

Over 1,800 were arrested during the RNC, which ran from August 30 to September 2, 2004. Many detainees complained of inhumane conditions, giving rise to the nickname "Guantanamo on the Hudson". The pens were so small that people had to take turns resting. Detainees were made to sleep on the floor, where dozens of them contracted rashes. Many detainees reported receiving little food or water while waiting to be processed, and in some cases, detainees were held for more than 24 hours. Lawyers also claimed that they were denied the chance to see their clients. Lawsuits over the detention facility, including several against the HRPT, continued for years after the RNC; most of these would eventually be settled in 2014.

==== Initial bidding and Cipriani proposal ====
The Hudson River Park Trust opened a request for proposals (RFP) for Pier 57 in October 2003 and received eight bids, four of which were eliminated in May 2004. Two additional bids from community groups were rejected that September due to insufficient funds, leaving two bids for the site. One of the remaining proposals—submitted by Roland W. Betts, who owned the Chelsea Piers complex—called for tennis facilities, swimming, art galleries, and radio broadcast studio for WNYC. The other bid, submitted by the event-venue operator Cipriani S.A., and the developer Steven C. Witkoff, called for an Italian cultural center known as "Leonardo at Pier 57", with a rooftop park, event space, marina, and museum. Supporters of each bid accused the other bid's promoters of bribery and nepotism.

Cipriani and Witkoff won the bidding process in 2005. Subsequently, an anonymous tip prompted the Manhattan District Attorney's office to investigate financial irregularities in Cipriani's bid. The tipster also alleged that former HRPT and Manhattan Republican Party chairman James Ortenzio had used his influence to secure the bid for Cipriani. Cipriani withdrew from the bid in 2006, after the city government sought to interview Giuseppe Cipriani of Cipriani S.A. about the corruption allegations. Several members of the Cipriani family and Ortenzio later pleaded guilty to allegations of tax and insurance fraud that arose from the investigation. Witkoff initially intended to continue pursuing the redevelopment on his own, but that effort also stalled. Witkoff ultimately quit in early 2008, prompting the HRPT to restart the RFP process for Pier 57.

=== 2010s to present: Young Woo redevelopment ===
==== New plans and revisions ====
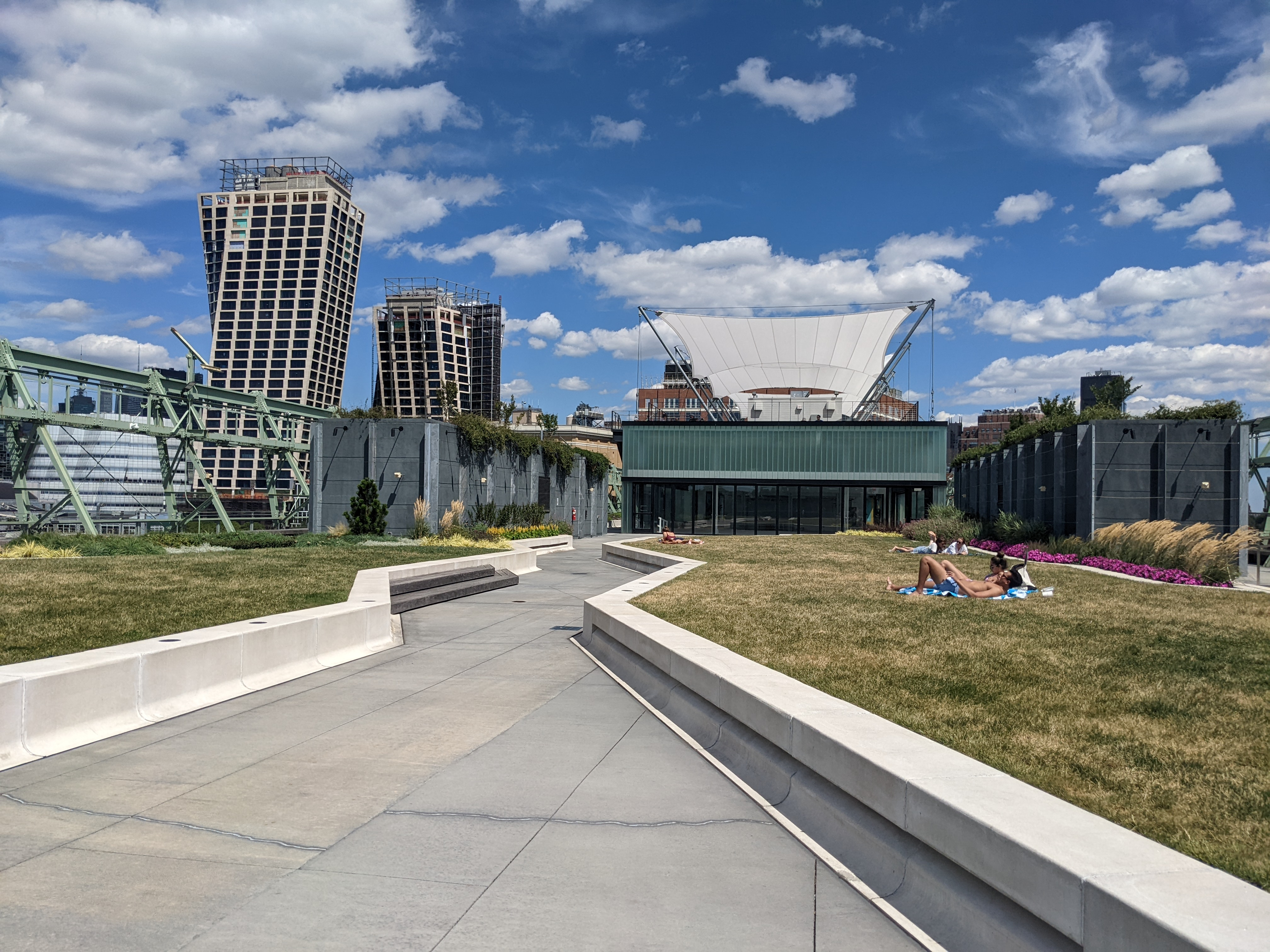
The rooftop park, facing east

The HRPT reopened the bidding process and identified three finalist bids that November: those of Young Woo & Associates (YWA), the Durst Organization, and the Related Companies. The next year, the HRPT selected YWA to redevelop the site. YWA beat out the two other bidders, who were reluctant to work with the restrictions placed by the HRPT. YWA initially proposed a shopping center at the pier, and LOT-EK, Beyer Blinder Belle, and West 8 were hired to design the renovation. Inside was to be 425,000 square feet (39,500 m^{2}) of mixed event, retail, and office space, including a business incubator housed in salvaged steel shipping containers. The architects planned to add intermediate mezzanine levels, stairs, ramps, and a wooden escalator. The Tribeca Film Festival (later Tribeca Festival) also leased the rooftop space for an entertainment venue. The pier was also planned to include a marina and a water taxi dock. The city government initiated the land-use approval process for Pier 57 in November 2011. In the interim, the pier was used for several galas, fashion shows, fundraisers, and pop-up shops.

The New York City Council approved YWA's plans in early 2013. Shortly afterward, YWA commissioned the artist Josemaría de Churtichaga to create the artwork Magic Carpet, consisting of 36 containers hanging from the pier's ceiling, as a proof of concept for the redevelopment. That September, the Pier 57 redevelopment was rebranded the SuperPier, after an early nickname for the pier. YWA's first three tenants were announced at that time. By then, the redevelopment was planned to cost $200 million. At that point, YWA planned to lease out about 430 shipping containers. YWA also planned to lease out 20 larger office spaces measuring 3,000 to 20,000 square feet (280 to 1,860 m^{2}) each, in addition to space on the roof and in the caissons. In response, Tribeca Film Festival sued YWA for breach of contract regarding the rooftop space. The plans to develop the SuperPier as a retail and incubator complex were ultimately unsuccessful, and the Hudson River Park Act was amended to permit a greater range of commercial uses, including office space.

YWA partnered with the developer RXR Realty in September 2014, announcing plans to convert part of the pier to offices. Handel Architects, which was hired to draw up the new plans, scrapped the original shipping-container proposal. Google signed a letter of intent for 250,000 square feet (23,000 m^{2}) at Pier 57 in May 2015, and the TV chef Anthony Bourdain announced plans later that year for Bourdain Market, a food marketplace at Pier 57 with over 100 stalls. That December, Google signed a lease to become Pier 57's primary tenant, and Bourdain signed a letter of intent for the market. The state government also approved the development, which by then was to have a rooftop park with a performance venue for the Tribeca Film Festival; this rooftop park was to be designed by the landscape architecture firm !Melk. By then, the project was scheduled to cost $350 million. To finance the redevelopment, RXR obtained a $225 million loan in early 2016.

==== Renovation and opening ====
Work on the pier's renovation began in May 2016. Bourdain Market had still not finalized a lease, prompting Bourdain to postpone the market's opening by two years to 2019. The market had issues attracting vendors, some of whom had difficulties obtaining American work visas, and YWA and RFR continued negotiating with other food market operators in the meantime. RXR also considered relocating an ocean liner, such as SS United States, to be adjacent to the pier. By early 2017, new glass panels were being added along the pier shed, at which point the pier was scheduled to reopen the next year. The structure topped out in June 2017. Plans for Bourdain Market were scrapped that December, without Bourdain ever having signed a lease. In February 2018, Google leased another 70,000 square feet (6,500 m^{2}) of offices within the space that had been reserved for Bourdain Market. Google also leased 50,000 square feet (4,600 m^{2}) for public uses and agreed to open a ferry pier there, and the food market was reduced to 40,000 square feet (3,700 m^{2}). By that time, Pier 57 was expected to open in 2019.

City Winery leased a 32,000-square-foot (3,000 m^{2}) food and entertainment space at Pier 57 in April 2019, and YWA and RXR received a $375 million loan that year to refinance the redevelopment. City Winery's space at Pier 57 cost $20 million to renovate, but its opening was delayed due to the onset of the COVID-19 pandemic in 2020. The venue finally opened in October 2020, though due to social distancing measures, it initially imposed capacity restrictions and sold COVID-19 rapid antigen tests to attract indoor diners. Google's offices in the building were still incomplete during the early 2020s, even as the firm concurrently acquired and renovated St. John's Terminal farther south. In January 2022, Google selected the James Beard Foundation to operate Pier 57's food marketplace, reviving the Bourdain Market concept. The Beard Foundation leased the food stalls to minority- and woman-owned businesses, and it also created a culinary demonstration venue, Platform, within the food hall.

The cost of the renovation ultimately totaled $410 million. Pier 57's rooftop park opened on April 18, and the Google offices opened that month, with space for 450 employees. At the time, Pier 57 was one of several properties occupied by Google's parent company Alphabet Inc. between 15th and 16th streets; the company also had space at Chelsea Market and 111 Eighth Avenue immediately to the east. The food market, Market 57, opened on April 1, 2023, and in the months after the market opened, pedestrian traffic into Hudson River Park more than doubled. City Winery leased additional space at Pier 57 in 2024, opening two restaurants there the next year.

== Reception and legacy ==
The caissons were dubbed "Cheeseboxes" during construction. The pier itself, branded as "The World's Most Modern Pier" and the "Superpier", was hailed as an innovative structure, being fireproof, extremely durable and immune to many of the problems that had historically plagued wooden waterfront construction. The New York Times dubbed the structure "a place where concrete floats", and the New York Herald Tribune called it "one of the world's outstanding ship terminals" in 1954. The Herald Tribune proclaimed that the pier "had many firsts to its credit", including its roof parking lot and its steel-and-concrete frame. Pier 57 was also one of New York City's first buildings to use prestressed concrete.

By the 2010s, The Wall Street Journal wrote that the pier had "had an unglamorous past" but that its development was helping revive the Hudson River waterfront. The New York Times wrote of the structural engineering in 2017: "The pier was dedicated in 1954. It is still without equal." After the pier's 2020s redevelopment, one observer for Curbed wrote that the rooftop park was extremely difficult to find and that, unlike the nearby High Line, the park did not lend itself easily to exploration. The Financial Times dubbed the building Google's "massive tech-campus on the water".

While the pier was being built, the American Society of Civil Engineers named Praeger its "metropolitan engineer of the year" in 1953, in part because of Pier 57's design. Praeger and Madigan-Hyland were awarded the Architectural League of New York's Gold Medal in Engineering for their caisson design in 1955. In 2023, the New York Landmarks Conservancy awarded Handel Architects the Lucy G. Moses Preservation Award for its restoration work on the building.

The structure was placed on the New York State and National Registers of Historic Places in 2004. The designation was granted because of the unconventional caisson design, rather than the headhouse's Art Deco-inspired design features. At the time, no other piers with floating caissons were believed to exist in the US.

== See also ==
- List of piers in New York City
- National Register of Historic Places listings in Manhattan from 14th to 59th Streets
