= Christopher Street Pier =

Piers in Manhattan, New York

Coordinates: 40°43′59″N 74°00′40″W

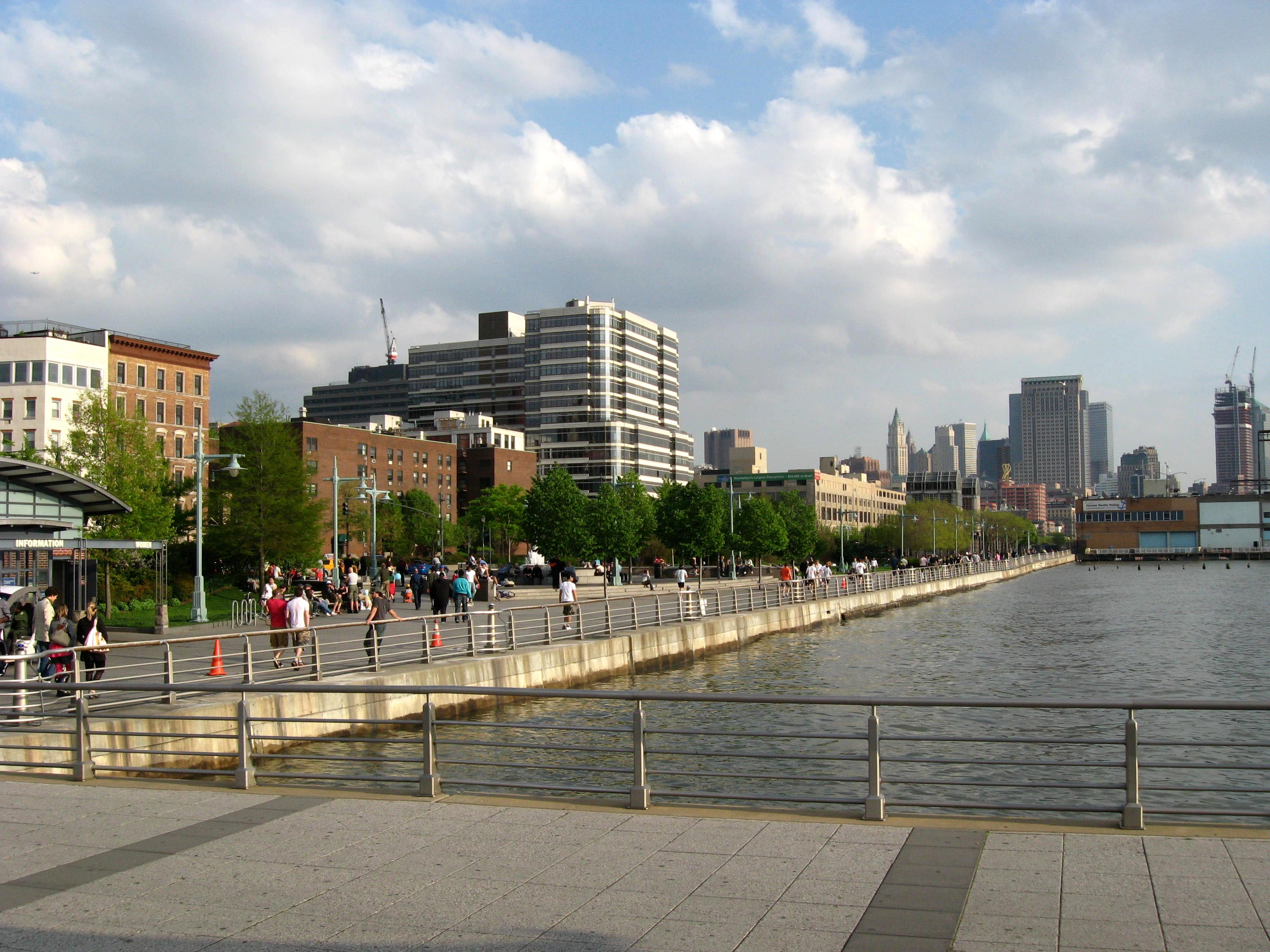
View from Christopher Street Pier, looking south (2008)

The Christopher Street Pier is a group of piers in Hudson River Park on the Hudson River waterfront of Greenwich Village, Manhattan, New York City, numbered 42, 45, 46, and 51. "Christopher Street Pier" usually refers specifically to Pier 45 opposite W. 10th Street, which can be reached by crossing West Street.

Once a working part of the Port of New York and New Jersey, the Pier had physically decayed by the 1980s and had developed reputation for being a place for meeting potential partners, often sexually, informally known as "cruising". Since renovations and the opening of the Hudson River Park's new Greenwich Village segment in 2003, it has remained a gathering place for gay people.

However, residents of Christopher Street have complained about noisy teenagers leaving the park after its 1 a.m. curfew. Community residents created a new plan in 2005 to have the Park Enforcement Patrol escort the teens to the 14th and Hudson Street exits.

In 2000, FIERCE formed as a community organization for LGBT youth in the surrounding waterfront area, producing a documentary that reflected concerns such as youth interactions with security personnel and a lack of investment in services for homeless people, which they contrasted with the city's investment in a redevelopment project.

The state's first memorial to the LGBT community was dedicated in June 2018, at the Hudson River Park near the Christopher Street Pier. The memorial, an abstract work by Anthony Goicolea, consists of nine boulders arranged in a circle. The memorial honors the victims of the 2016 Orlando nightclub shooting.

== See also ==
- List of piers in New York City
