= Merchants Refrigerating Company Warehouse =

Building in Manhattan, New York

- U.S. National Register of Historic Places
- New York State Register of Historic Places
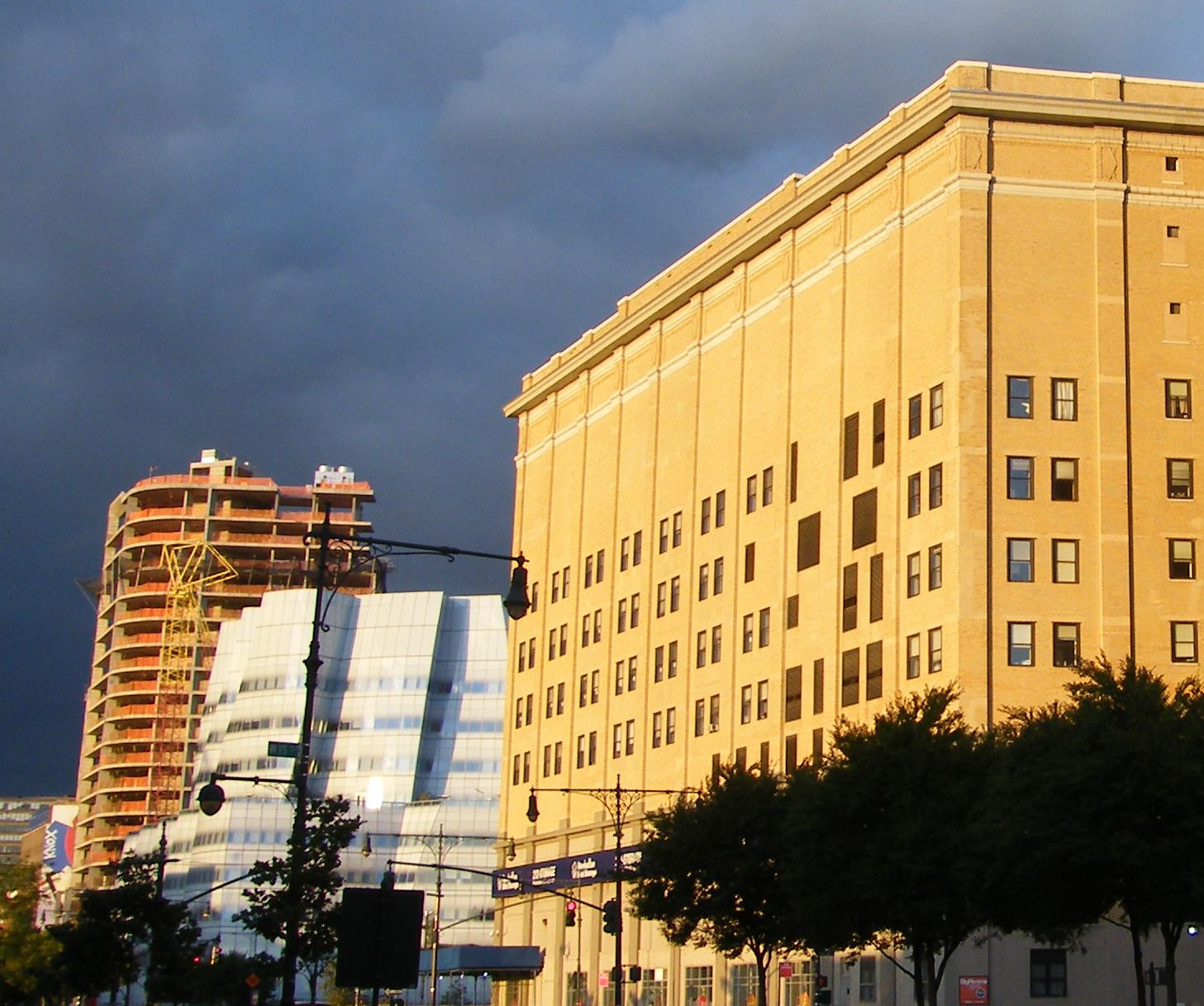

- Location within Manhattan Location within New York City Location within New York Location within the United States
- Location: 501 W. 16th St., Manhattan, New York, US
- Coordinates: 40°44′38″N 74°00′28″W
- Area: less than one acre
- Built: 1916
- Built by: Turner Construction Co.
- Architect: John B. Snooks' Sons
- Architectural style: Renaissance
- NRHP reference No.: 85001171
- NYSRHP No.: 06101.001715

Significant dates
- Added to NRHP: 1985-05-31
- Designated NYSRHP: 1984-05-18

The Merchants Refrigerating Company Warehouse is an 11-story industrial building at 501 West 16th Street in the Chelsea neighborhood of Manhattan in New York City, New York, US. Occupying a full city block, the warehouse was designed by John B. Snook & Sons and developed between 1916 and 1918. The facade is made of buff brick, cast stone, granite, and terracotta, and was originally built with a minimal amount of windows. After being sold in 1983, the building was initially proposed for conversion into a mall; it was then renovated into office space, with windows added. It is on the National Register of Historic Places.

== Description ==
The Merchants Refrigerating Company Warehouse is located at 501 West 16th Street (also 99 Tenth Avenue) in the Chelsea neighborhood of Manhattan in New York City, New York, US. It measures approximately 330 by 200 feet (101 by 61 m) across, occupying the entirety of a trapezoidal land lot without any interruptions such as an interior lightwell. The lot covers a full city block between 16th Street to the south, Tenth Avenue to the east, 17th Street to the north, and Eleventh Avenue (West Side Highway; originally Marginal Street) to the west. Nearby buildings include Pier 57 to the southwest, IAC Building to the north, and Chelsea Market to the east, while two blocks to the south is Manhattan's Meatpacking District. The building was designed by John B. Snook & Sons with simple Renaissance Revival decorations.

=== Exterior ===
The facade is made of buff brick, cast stone, granite, and terracotta. Due to the trapezoidal shape of the building, each elevation of the facade is divided into a different number of bays: 14 to the south (on 16th Street), 10 each to the west and east (on the avenues), and 17 to the north (on 17th Street). Each bay is separated by piers made of brick. Bands run horizontally above the third and tenth floors, dividing the structure into three horizontal layers.

View from the north

At the ground or first story, the northern and southern elevations have large loading dock separated by piers, with iron or steel canopies above. The western and eastern elevations, for the most part, lack loading docks at the ground story; the few loading docks that do exist on these elevations have no canopies. Directly above these loading docks are metal windows on the second floor. The piers have cream-colored terracotta decorations above the second floor. At the eastern elevation, a spur from the High Line viaduct formerly carried trains inside. On the third floor, the spandrel panels are made of brick laid in a gridded pattern, rather than the offset running bond pattern seen in much of the facade. Above this floor is a cream terracotta cornice which wraps around the building, including around the piers.

The fourth to tenth floors originally had similar, minimalist facades on all elevations. To keep cold air in, the structure was originally designed with a minimal amount of windows between the piers. The lack of windows also allowed water to drain more easily from the roof and, by extension, decreased the likelihood of leakage through the walls. Windows were added between the bays after the building was completed. Above the 10th floor is another cream terracotta band, followed by an eleventh-floor facade with chevron-patterned brickwork. There is a parapet running around the roof, along with a cornice made of cast stone.

=== Interior ===
The interior was initially used for cold storage, i.e. storage of objects that needed refrigeration, and stored a wide variety of fresh foods throughout the year. Originally, the interior had four north–south partition walls that divided the otherwise open plan floor slabs into five sections. These spaces have concrete columns with octagonal cross sections. The basement originally had trusswork to support the weight of a former ground-level railroad track from 10th Avenue, along with a refrigeration plant near the Hudson River at the western end. The 3rd floor has trusses that support the rail spur from the High Line. A 1985 National Park Service report wrote that the 2nd floor had since been partitioned further, while the 4th to 11th floors had an identical layout with four partitions per floor. By 1991, the 1st through 8th floors were all used as offices and the upper floors as storage.

Structurally, the building is made of reinforced concrete, to protect against fire and reduce maintenance costs. An open shaft and escalators run between each floor, taking up less than 1% of the floor area, while three groups of stairs and elevators provide circulation throughout the building. The interiors are plain, except for decorative concrete formwork. As built, the exterior walls had cork and wallboard, and there were galvanized steel and wire glass windows, along with insulated doors. To reduce the possibility of moisture buildup in the interior space itself, the building uses hollow tiled walls, where moist air could instead accumulate.

== History ==
=== Original use ===
Before mechanical refrigeration became commonplace, food and other perishable goods had to be stored in coolers with natural ice, which tended to be unsanitary and inconsistent in quality. The Merchants Refrigerating Company Warehouse was constructed between 1916 and 1918, at a time when mechanical refrigeration was being deployed at large scale. Plans for the building were formally announced in January 1917. Turner Construction Company was the general contractor, while John B. Snook & Sons was the architect of record. The Merchants Refrigerating Company and the New York Central Railroad, which operated its West Side Line on Tenth Avenue, requested the New York City Board of Estimate's permission to build a railroad track into the building. The Board of Estimate initially wished to charge rent for each railcar on the track. which the railroad was loath to pay.

Spur from the High Line

When built, the structure was the world's largest refrigerated warehouse and was a modern mechanical refrigeration plant for its time. Shortly after the building's completion, it was taken over by the United States Army Quartermaster Corps for the World War I effort. The government requested and received permission from the Board of Estimate to complete a rail spur into the building. By 1925 alone, the building stored a quarter-million shipments with 18 million pounds (8.2 kt) of meat, dairy, fruit, and other perishable foods. The High Line viaduct was built in the early 1930s, replacing the tracks on Tenth Avenue; the former spur tracks from Tenth Avenue were replaced by spurs of that viaduct.

The building continued to be used through the late 20th century, when demand for refrigeration warehouses declined after World War II. In the late 1940s, workers at the warehouse experimented with chemical treatments to increase the longevity of eggs. The Merchants Refrigerating Company expanded its operations to the adjacent block between 17th and 18th Streets in 1956. The Merchants Refrigerating Company decided to sell nine of its eleven warehouses in 1981, keeping only the New York City warehouse and another in Buffalo, New York. Belz Investment and Abraham Hirschfeld's Hirschfeld Realty bought the building for $7 million in 1983. After the building was vacated, it was so large that the structure took seven months to thaw before it could be used.

=== Later use ===
Belz and Hirschfeld announced plans in 1984 to convert the warehouse into a shopping center, which they branded as the first factory outlet mall in the city. The mall was to cost $12 million; of this, $2.5 million would come from a state loan, which the state's Urban Development Corporation approved that July. The building was listed on the National Register of Historic Places in 1985. The mall project itself drew opposition from residents, who claimed it would bring too much traffic into the neighborhood. The project stalled for two years due to delays in completing the environmental impact assessment. As the site was zoned for industrial use, the partners requested a zoning change to convert the bottom eight floors into a mall, but their Uniform Land Use Review Procedure application lapsed after Belz and Hirschfeld failed to prove that the building had enough parking spaces. The local Manhattan Community Board 4 recommended approval of the plans in late 1987, more than three years of consideration.

The shopping mall was canceled in 1989, in favor of conversion into office space; at the time, the US Drug Enforcement Administration (DEA) was interested in occupying the building. The DEA had selected the building because of its sturdiness and the fact that the building had enough parking space for hundreds of DEA cars inside. Emery Roth & Sons was hired to oversee the renovation. As part of the office conversion process, windows were carved into the walls, and jail cells were added in the building. The DEA began leasing space in 1991; it occupied the lowest eight floors, while Edison Parking owned the top three floors and occupied it as storage space. By then, the spur track to the High Line had been cut off. The DEA renewed its lease with Hirschfeld in 2014 and still rented 200,000 square feet (19,000 m^{2}) as of 2025.

== See also ==
- National Register of Historic Places listings in Manhattan from 14th to 59th Streets

== Sources ==
- Historic Structure Report: Merchants Refrigerating Company Warehouse (PDF) (Report). National Park Service. May 31, 1985.
- Pier 57 EIS (February 22, 2013). Pier 57 Redevelopment Project: Final Environmental Impact Statement (PDF) (Report). Hudson River Park Trust; Hudson Eagle, LLC; AKRF, Inc.; Sam Schwartz Engineering.
