= Emil Praeger =

American architect

Emil Hugh Praeger
- Born: August 2, 1892; New York City, U.S.
- Died: October 16, 1973 (aged 81); Manhasset, New York, U.S.
- Education: Rensselaer Polytechnic Institute
- Spouse: Edna Quinn (m. 1918)
- Children: 2
- Military career
- Branch: United States Navy
- Rank: Captain
- Conflicts: World War I, World War II
- Awards: Legion of Merit

Emil H. Praeger (August 2, 1892 – October 16, 1973) was an American architect and civil engineer.

== Biography ==
Praeger was born in 1892. In 1915, Praeger graduated from Rensselaer Polytechnic Institute (RPI). He served in the US Navy during World War I, after which he spent time at the architectural office of Bertram Goodhue and the New York City engineering firm Madigan-Hyland.

In 1934, as chief engineer for the City of New York Department of Parks & Recreation, Praeger surveyed all New York City parks. Under director Robert Moses, Praeger created architectural drawings, descriptions, and photographs for every park that the city owned. He also acted as head of the civil engineering department at RPI from 1939 to 1946.

During World War II, Praeger served in the US Navy, and he eventually reached the rank of captain. He developed the original design of the concrete floating breakwater – known as "Phoenix" – for the Invasion of Normandy.

Praeger served as consulting engineer on the White House Reconstruction in 1949.

He died on October 16, 1973 at North Shore Hospital in Manhasset, New York.

== Selected work ==
- Henry Hudson Bridge, (chief engineer) New York, 1932
- Marine Parkway-Gil Hodges Memorial Bridge, (chief engineer) New York, 1937
- Pier 57, New York City, 1952
- Arecibo Telescope at the Arecibo Observatory, Puerto Rico, 1952.
- Holman Stadium, (chief engineer) Vero Beach, Florida, 1953
- Tappan Zee Bridge, New York, 1955
- Throg's Neck Bridge, (consulting engineer) New York, 1961
- Shea Stadium, Flushing, New York, 1964
- Dodger Stadium, Los Angeles, California, 1962
