= Madigan-Hyland =

American engineering company (1927–1967)

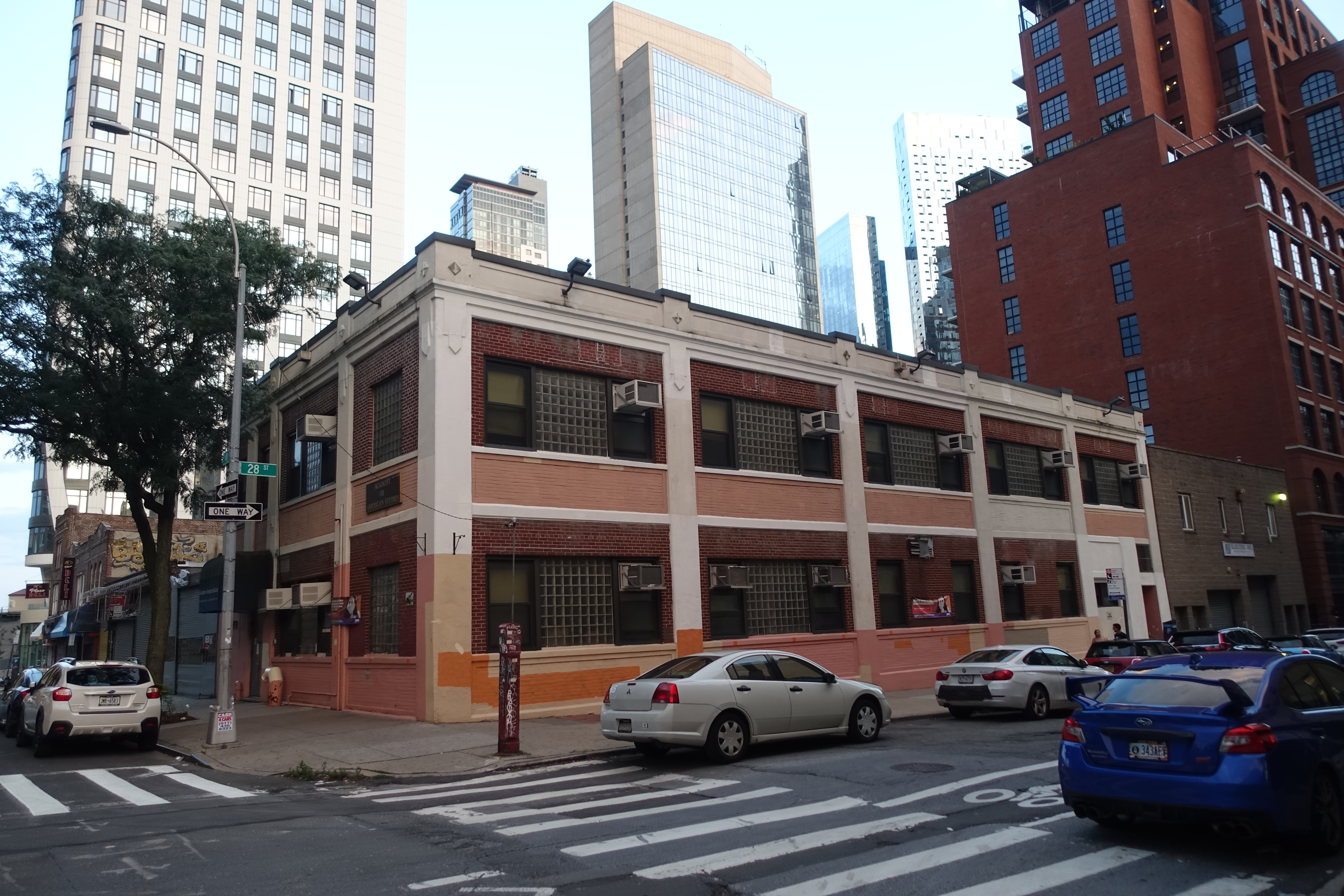
- Former headquarters, now used by the Academy of American Studies
- Type: Engineering
- Industry: Engineering
- Founder: Michael J. Madigan, Richard V. Hyland
- Headquarters: New York City, United States
- Services: Design

Madigan-Hyland was an American engineering firm active in the New York City area, named for founders Michael J. ("Jack") Madigan and Richard V. Hyland. Their offices were located in Long Island City.

The firm's work in New York City was closely associated with the tenure of Robert Moses as NYC Parks Commissioner, and included many major elements of the city's infrastructure. They often worked in concert with architects, other engineers and specialty consultants to complete large and complex urban infrastructure projects.

== Origins ==
Madigan (1894-1981) was a Danbury, Connecticut native who worked his way up in the construction industry without formal education and who did not complete high school. Hyland received his training as a civil engineer from Notre Dame University. The two met in 1927 and formed the firm shortly after, with Madigan providing business experience and New York City connections, complemented by Hyland's professional design expertise.

Madigan had met and impressed Robert Moses - then the president of the Long Island Park Commission - the year before while serving as superintendent on a portion of the development of Jones Beach State Park for another company. During World War II, he was a special assistant to Robert Patterson, then the Undersecretary of War, and was awarded the Medal for Merit as acknowledgement of his efforts. Subsequent to the war, he became the World Bank's chief engineer from 1947-49 and again from 1951-67 at which point he retired from the industry.

Distinguished employees of the firm included Emil Praeger, a notable engineer and designer in his own right.

== Selected work ==
- West Side Elevated Highway
- Cross Bay Veterans Memorial Bridge
- Marine Parkway–Gil Hodges Memorial Bridge
- Gov. Thomas E. Dewey Thruway
- Tappan Zee Bridge
- Pier 57 (1954), New York City, listed on the National Register of Historic Places

The firm was also part of a large team of consultants who contributed to the design of the Bronx-Whitestone Bridge, including principal designer Othmar Ammann, and was also involved in the later strengthening and widening of the bridge.
