= List of piers in New York City =

Piers in New York City

New York City's piers have served important roles in New York City's history, including as a major element of the city's industrial activity as well as the primary area where immigrants were received by the city. Over time, and with the city's de-instrialization, many of the remaining piers have been converted into public parks.

== History ==
As of the 1860s, New York City's piers and wharves were the city government's most valuable assets, valued at $15.8 million in 1867, despite in many cases, badly needing repair. Due to the piers' poor state of repair, steamboat companies left to other nearby cities such as Hoboken and Jersey City. As of 1866, the New York State Legislature appropriated funds to repair and maintain the piers, but the appropriations failed to receive the Governor's approval and the piers were left to decay and pier and tenants of other port structures began withholding rents, estimated at $100,000 as 1867, due to the city's negligence in keeping the structures in repair. A report ordered by the city government subsequent to such development found that several of the piers owned by the city had been claimed to be under private ownership. At some point, the piers in Manhattan along both the North and East rivers were renumbered and rebuilt as part of a modernization scheme.

By the 1980s, Manhattan's Hudson River waterfront had become deindustrialized and largely derelict. Established in 1998, Hudson River Park, absorbed direction of numerous of the river's piers.

== List of North River Piers Pre-Renumbering ==
Piers of the North River by number, location, key dates, and notes
Number	Location	Opened	Rebuilt	Closed	Notes
A	Battery Park	1886			
1	West St. and Battery Pl.				
2	West St. north of Battery Pl.				Redeveloped into Battery Park City
3	West St. south of Morris St.				Redeveloped into Battery Park City
4	West St. and Morris St.				Former Pennsylvania Railroad pier. Redeveloped into Battery Park City
5	West St. north of Morris St.				Former Pennsylvania Railroad pier. Redeveloped into Battery Park City
6	West St. south of Rector St.				Redeveloped into Battery Park City
7	West St. south of Rector St.				Redeveloped into Battery Park City
8	West St. and Rector St.				Redeveloped into Battery Park City
9	West St. north of Rector St.				Redeveloped into Battery Park City
10	West St. south of Carlisle St.				Redeveloped into Battery Park City
11	West St. and Carlisle St				Redeveloped into Battery Park City
12	West St. south of Albany St.				Redeveloped into Battery Park City
13	West St. north of Albany St.				Redeveloped into Battery Park City
14	West St. and Cedar St.				Redeveloped into Battery Park City
15	West St. north of Cedar St				Rump barge dock pier connected to and to the north of pier 14. Redeveloped into Battery Park City
16	West St. north of Liberty St				Redeveloped into Battery Park City
17	West St. south of Cortlandt St.				Rump barge dock pier between and connected to piers 16 and 18. Redeveloped into Battery Park City
18	West St. and Cortlandt St.				Redeveloped into Battery Park City
19	West St. south of Dey St.				Redeveloped into Battery Park City
20	Southwest corner of West Washington Market				Used to serve the West Washington Market. Redeveloped into Battery Park City
21	West edge of West Washington Market				Used to serve the West Washington Market. Redeveloped into Battery Park City
22	West side of West Washington Market				Pier designation for the west waterfront side of the West Washington Market between piers 21 and 23. Redeveloped into Battery Park City
23	Northwest corner of West Washington Market				Used to serve the West Washington Market. Redeveloped into Battery Park City
24	West St. between Vesey and Barclay St.				Used to serve the West Washington Market. Redeveloped into Battery Park City
25	West St. and Barclay St.				Redeveloped into Battery Park City
26	West St. north of Barclay St.				Rump pier between piers 25 and 27. Redeveloped into Battery Park City
27	West St. and Park Pl.				Redeveloped into Battery Park City
28	West St. and Murray St.				Redeveloped into Battery Park City
29	West St. and Warren St.				Redeveloped into Battery Park City
31	West St. between Reade and Duane Sts.				Redeveloped into Battery Park City
32	West St. North of Duane St.				Demolished
33	West St. and Jay St.				
34	West St. and Harrison St.				
35	West St. and Franklin St.				
36	West St. and N. Moore St.				
37	West St. and Beach St.				
38	West St. and Hubert St.				
39	West St. and Vestry St.				
40	West St. and Watts St.				
41	West St. south of Canal St.				
42	West St. south of Spring St.				
43	West St. north of Spring St.				
44	West St. south of Charlton St.				
45	West St. and Charlton St.				
46	West St. and King St.				
47	West St. and Houston St.				
48	West St. and Clarkson St.				
49	West St. and Leroy St.				
50	West St. and Morton St.				
51	West St. and Barrow St.				
52	West St. and Christopher St.				
53	West St. and W. 10th St.				Used by the White Star Line at one point
54	West St. and Charles St.				

== List of North River Piers Post-Renumbering ==
Piers of the North River by number, location, key dates, and notes
Number	Location	Opened	Rebuilt	Closed	Notes
A	Battery Park	1886			
1	West St. and Battery Pl.				
2	West St. north of Battery Pl.		Between 1923 and 1930		Rebuilt into new PRR pier complex
3	West St. north of Battery Pl.			Between 1923 and 1930	Rebuilt into new PRR pier complex
4	West St. south of Morris St.			Between 1923 and 1930	Rebuilt into new PRR pier complex
5	West St. and Morris St.			Between 1923 and 1930	Rebuilt into new PRR pier complex
6	West St. north of Morris St.			Between 1923 and 1930	Rebuilt into new PRR pier complex
7	West St. south of Rector St.				
8	West St. and Rector St.				
9	West St. south of Carlisle St.				
10	West St. and Albany St.				
11	West St. and Cedar St.				
13	West St. south of Dey St.				
14	West St. and Fulton St.				
15	West St. north of Vesey St.				
16	West St. and Barclay St.				
17	West St. and Park Pl.				
18	West St. and Murray St.				
19	West St. and Warren St.				
20	West St. and Chambers St.				
21	West St. and Duane St.				
22	West St. north of Jay St.				
23	West St. north of Harrison St.				
24	West St. and Franklin St.				
25	West St. and N. Moore St.				Currently part of Hudson River Park
26	West St. and N. Moore St.				Currently part of Hudson River Park
27	West St. and Hubert St.				
28	West St. and Laight St.				
29	West St. and Vestry St.				
31	West St. and Watts St.				
32	West St. and Hubert St.				
33	West St. and Canal St.				
34	West St. and Spring St.		1927		Part of Hudson River Park, connects to Holland Tunnel ventilation shaft.
35	West St. north of Spring St.				
36	West St. south of Charlton St.				
37	West St. and Charlton St.				
38	West St. and King St.				
39	West St. and W Houston St.				
40	West St. and Houston Street		1962		Parking garage and sports facility. Original Pier 40 located at Clarkson St.
41	West St. and Leroy St.				
42	West St. and Morton St.				
43	West St. and Barrow St.				
44	West St. and Christopher St.				
45	West St. and W. 10th St.				
46	West St. and Charles St.				
51	West St. and Jane St.				
52	West St. and Gansevoort St.				Deteriorated and demolished. Site now location of Gansevoort Peninsula beach
53	Bloomfield St.				Now forms northern bound of Gansevoort Peninsula. Home of FDNY Marine Company 1.
54					Deteriorated and demolished. Site now part of Little Island at Pier 55
55					Deteriorated and demolished. Now site of Little Island at Pier 55
57	West 15th Street	1907	1954		Replaced a wooden pier #57 that stood from 1907 to 1947. Current structure built in 1954 for Grace Line, converted to a bus garage in 1969. Currently part of the Hudson River Park
59					Currently part of Chelsea Piers
60	West 20th Street				Currently part of Chelsea Piers
61					Currently part of Chelsea Piers
63	West St. and W. 23rd St.				
64	West St. and W. 24th St.				
65	West St. north of W. 25th St.				
66	West St. north of W. 26th St.				
67	West St. north of W. 27th St.				
68	West St. north of W. 28th St.				
69	West St. and W. 29th St.				
70	West St. and W. 30th St.				
71	West St. and W. 31st St.				
72	West St. and W. 32nd St.				Wooden posts remain in the river
73	West St. and W. 33rd St.				
74	12th Ave and W. 34th St.				Demolished. Former mixed-use pier for France & Canada Steamship Corporation
75	12th Ave and W. 35th St.				Demolished
76	12th Ave and W. 36th St.				Original rail-ship transloading pier for the New York Central Railroad demolished. Current pier formerly industrial space and then used as an NYPD tow pound; now part of Hudson River Park.
77	12th Ave and W. 37th St.				Demolished. Former Pennsylvania Railroad freight pier
78	12th Ave and W. 38th St.				Partially demolished. Former Pennsylvania Railroad freight pier
79	12th Ave and W. 39th St.				Demolished
80	12th Ave and W. 40th St.				Demolished
81	12th Ave and W. 41st St.				
83	12th Ave and W. 43rd St.				Former New York Central Railroad freight pier. Currently hosts Circle Line Sightseeing Cruises
84	12th Ave and W. 44th St.				Former Cunard Line pier. Currently part of Hudson River Park
86	12th Ave and W. 46th St.		2006		Former freight pier demolished in 2006. New pier hosts the Intrepid Museum
87	12th Ave and W. 47th St.				Demolished
88	12th Ave and W. 48th St.		1937		Original pier demolished for New York Passenger Ship Terminal expansion in the 1930s. Currently one of two remaining operational Manhattan Cruise Terminal piers.
89	12th Ave and W. 49th St.			1930s	Demolished for New York Passenger Ship Terminal expansion
90	12th Ave and W. 50th St.		1937		Original pier demolished for New York Passenger Ship Terminal expansion. Currently part of Manhattan Cruise Terminal
91	12th Ave and W. 51st St.			1930s	Demolished for New York Passenger Ship Terminal expansion
92	12th Ave and W. 52nd St.		1937		Original pier demolished for New York Passenger Ship Terminal expansion. Subsequently used as exhibition space, but declared structurally unsafe in 2019.
93	12th Ave and W. 53rd St.				
94	12th Ave and W. 54th St.				Reconstructed and opened as Sunset Pier 94 Studios in 2026
95	12th Ave and W. 55th St.				
96	12th Ave and W. 56th St.				
97	12th Ave and W. 57th St.	1921-1934		use as	Former Swedish American Line. Reconstructed for recreational use as part of Hudson River Park
98	12th Ave and W. 58th St.				Currently a Consolidated Edison fuel transfer facility
99	12th Ave and W. 59th St.				Currently a DSNY freight pier
B	West 63rd Street				Formerly a car float pier for the New York Central Railroad
D	West 64th Street	1880s		2011	Formerly a car float pier for the New York Central Railroad, dismantled in 2011
E	West 65th Street				Formerly a car float pier for the New York Central Railroad
F	West 66th Street				Formerly a car float pier for the New York Central Railroad
G	West 67th Street				Formerly a car float pier for the New York Central Railroad
I	West 70th Street		2001		Formerly a car float pier for the New York Central Railroad. Currently part of Riverside Park

== List of East River Piers in Manhattan Pre-Renumbering ==
Piers of the East River in Manhattan by number, location, key dates, and notes
Number	Location	Opened	Rebuilt	Closed	Notes
1	Battery Park				Ferries to Staten Island operated by the Baltimore and Ohio Railroad
2	South St. and Whitehall St.				
3	South St. and Moore St.				
4	South St. west of Broad St.				
5	South St. east of Broad St.				
6	South St. and Coenties Slip E.				
7	South St. and Coenties Slip				
8	South St. and Coenties Slip W.				
9	South St. east of Coenties Slip				
10	South St. west of Old Slip				
11	South St. and Old Slip				
12	South St. east of Old Slip				
13	South St. east of Gouveneur Ln.				
14	South St. west of Wall St.				
15	South St. and Wall St.				
16	South St. east of Wall St.				
17	South St. and Pine St.				
18	South St. west of Maiden Ln.				
19	South St. east of Maiden Ln.				
20	South St. east of John St.				
21	South St. west of John St.				
22	South St. west of Fulton St.				
23	South St. and Beekman St.				
24	South St. west of Peck Slip				
25	South St. and Peck Slip				
26	South St. east of Peck Slip				
27	South St. west of Dover St.				
28	South St. east of Dover St.				
29	South St. and Robert Wagner Pl.				
30	South St. west of James Slip				
31	South St. west of James Slip				
32	South St. east of James Slip				
33	South St. and Oliver St				
34	South St. west of Catherine Slip				
35	South St. east of Catherine Slip				
36	South St. west of Market Slip				
37	South St. west of Market Slip				
38	South St. east of Market Slip				
39	South St. east of Market Slip				
40	South St. west of Pike Slip				
41	South St. east of Pike Slip				
42	South St. east of Pike Slip				
43	South St. west of Rutgers Slip				
44	South St. east of Rutgers Slip				
45	South St. west of Jefferson St.				
46	South St. and Jefferson St.				
47	South St. west of Clinton St.				
48	South St. and Clinton St.				
49	South St. east of Clinton St.				
50	South St. and Montgomery St.				
51	South St. west of Gouverneur Slip				
52	South St. east of Gouverneur Slip				
53	South St. west of Jackson St.				
54	South St. and Jackson St.				
55	East St. and Grand St				
56	East St. south of Broome Slip				
57	East St. north of Broome Slip				
58	East St. south of Delancey Slip				
60	East St. and Rivington St.				
61	Tompkins St. north of Rivington St.				
62	Tompkins St. and Stanton St.				
63	Tompkins St. and E 3rd St.				
64	Lewis St. and E 5th St.				
65	Lewis St. and E 6th St.				
66	Lewis St. and E 7th St.				
67	Lewis St. and E 8th St.				
68	Avenue D and E 9th St.				
69	Avenue D and E 10th St.				
70	Avenue D and E 11th St.				
71	Avenue D and E 12th St.				
72	Avenue D and E 13th St.				

== List of East River Piers in Manhattan Post-Renumbering ==
Piers of the East River in Manhattan by number, location, key dates, and notes
Number	Location	Opened	Rebuilt	Closed	Notes
1	South St. west of Whitehall St.	1903	2005		Current building built 1903, completely rebuilt in 2005. Currently hosts ferry service to Staten Island
2	South St. east of Whitehall St.				Current building built 1909, renovated multiple times since. Currently hosts ferry service to Governors Island
4	South St. and Broad St.				
5	South St. west of Coenties Slip				
6	South St. and Coenties Slip		1960		Former industrial pier rebuilt into Downtown Manhattan Heliport
7	South St. east of Coenties Slip				
8	South St. between Coenties Slip and Old Slip				
9	South St. west of Old Slip				Dismantled
10	South St. east of Old Slip				
11	South St. west of Wall St.		1996		Pier 11/Wall Street ferry terminal
12	South St. and Wall St.				
13	South St. east of Wall St.				
14	South St. west of Maiden Ln.				
15	South St. east of Fletcher St.				Part of the East River Greenway
16	South St. between John and Fulton Sts.				Part of the East River Greenway
17	South St. east of Fulton St.				Part of the South Street Seaport
18	South St. and Beekman St.				Site consumed by Pier 17 complex
19	South St. west of Peck Slip				
20	South St. east of Peck Slip				
21	South St. and Dover St.				
25	South St. and Oliver St.				
26	South St. west of Catharine Slip				
27	South St. east of Catharine Slip				
28	South St. between Catharine Slip and Market Slip				
29	South St. and Market Slip				
30	South St. east of Market Slip				
31	South St. west of Pike Slip				
32	South St. east of Pike Slip				
33	South St. west of Rutgers Slip				
34	South St. and Rutgers Slip				
35	South and Jefferson Sts.				Part of East River Park, home to “Mussel Beach” conservation project
36	299 South St.				Event Space
37	South and Clinton Sts.				
38	South St. west of Montgomery St.				
39	South St. and Montgomery St.				
40	South St. and Gouverneur Slip W.				
41	South St. and Gouverneur Slip E.				
42	South St. east of Gouverneur Slip				
43	South St. east of Gouverneur Slip				
44	South St. west of Jackson St.				
45	South and Jackson Sts.				
45	South and Jackson Sts.				
46	East and Broome Sts.				
47	East St. south of Delancey St.				
48	East and Delancey Sts.				
50	East and Rivington Sts.				
51	Tompkins St. north of Rivington St.				
52	Tompkins and Stanton Sts.				
53	Tompkins St. south of E. Houston St.				
54	Tompkins and E. Houston Sts.				
55	Tompkins and E 3rd Sts.				
56	Tompkins and E 4th Sts.				
57	Lewis and E 5th Sts.				
58	Lewis and E 6th Sts.				
59	Lewis and E 7th Sts.				
60	Lewis and E 8th Sts.				
61	Avenue D and E 9th St.				
62	Avenue D and E 10th St.				
63	Avenue D and E 11th St.				
64	Avenue D and E 12th St.				
65	Avenue D and E 13th St.				
66	Avenue C and E 18th St.				Formerly used by Carroll Box and Lumber Company
67	Avenue C and E 19th St.				Formerly used by DSNY Mechanical Bureau
68	Avenue C and E 20th St.				Formerly used by Moore-McCormack
69	Avenue C and E 21st St.				Formerly used by Transit Mix Concrete Corporation
70	Avenue C and E 22nd St.				
71	Avenue C and E 23rd St.				
72	Avenue A and E 24th St.				Formerly a recreation pier
73	First Ave. and E 25th St.				Dismantled in 1960s to make way for United Nations International School
74	First Ave. and E 26th St.				Formerly used by New York City Department of Public Welfare. Demolished; site now part of Waterside Plaza.
77	First Ave. and E 29th St.				
78	First Ave. and E 30th St.				
79	First Ave. and E 31st St.				Leased to Loening Aeronautical Engineering Corporation in 1920s; used by Midtown Skyport in 1930s
80	First Ave. and E 32nd St.				
81	First Ave. and E 33rd St.				
85	First Ave. and E 35th St.				
86	First Ave. and E 36th St.				
87	First Ave. and E 37th St.				
88	First Ave. and E 38th St.				
89	First Ave. and E 39th St.				

== List of piers in Brooklyn ==
Piers in Brooklyn by number, location, opening and closing dates, and notes
Number	Location	Opened	Rebuilt	Closed	Notes
1					Currently part of Brooklyn Bridge Park
2					Brooklyn Bridge Park Roller Rink
3					Brooklyn Bridge Park Green Space Plaza
4					Brooklyn Bridge Park Beach and Boathouse
5					Brooklyn Bridge Park Sports fields, Picnicking, & Promenade
6					Brooklyn Bridge Park Liberty Lawn
7					Part of Red Hook Container Terminal, operating as warehouse for beer distribution company
8					Part of Red Hook Container Terminal, Pier for D&M Lumber
9A	Kane St				Part of Red Hook Container Terminal, hosts a set of container cranes for the terminal
9B	Degraw St.				Part of Red Hook Container Terminal
10	North edge of Atlantic Basin				Part of Red Hook Container Terminal, hosts a set of container cranes for the terminal
11	East edge of Atlantic Basin				Part of Red Hook Container Terminal
12	South edge of Atlantic Basin	2006			Part of Red Hook Container Terminal, hosts Brooklyn Cruise Terminal
C					Currently part of Brooklyn Navy Yard

== Works cited ==
- The Commissioners of the Sinking Fund of the City of New York (1867). Wharves, piers and slips, belonging to the corporation of the city of New York, 1868. The New York Printing Company.
