= Pier 42 (East River) =

Pier in Manhattan, New York

Coordinates: 40°42′37″N 73°58′55″W

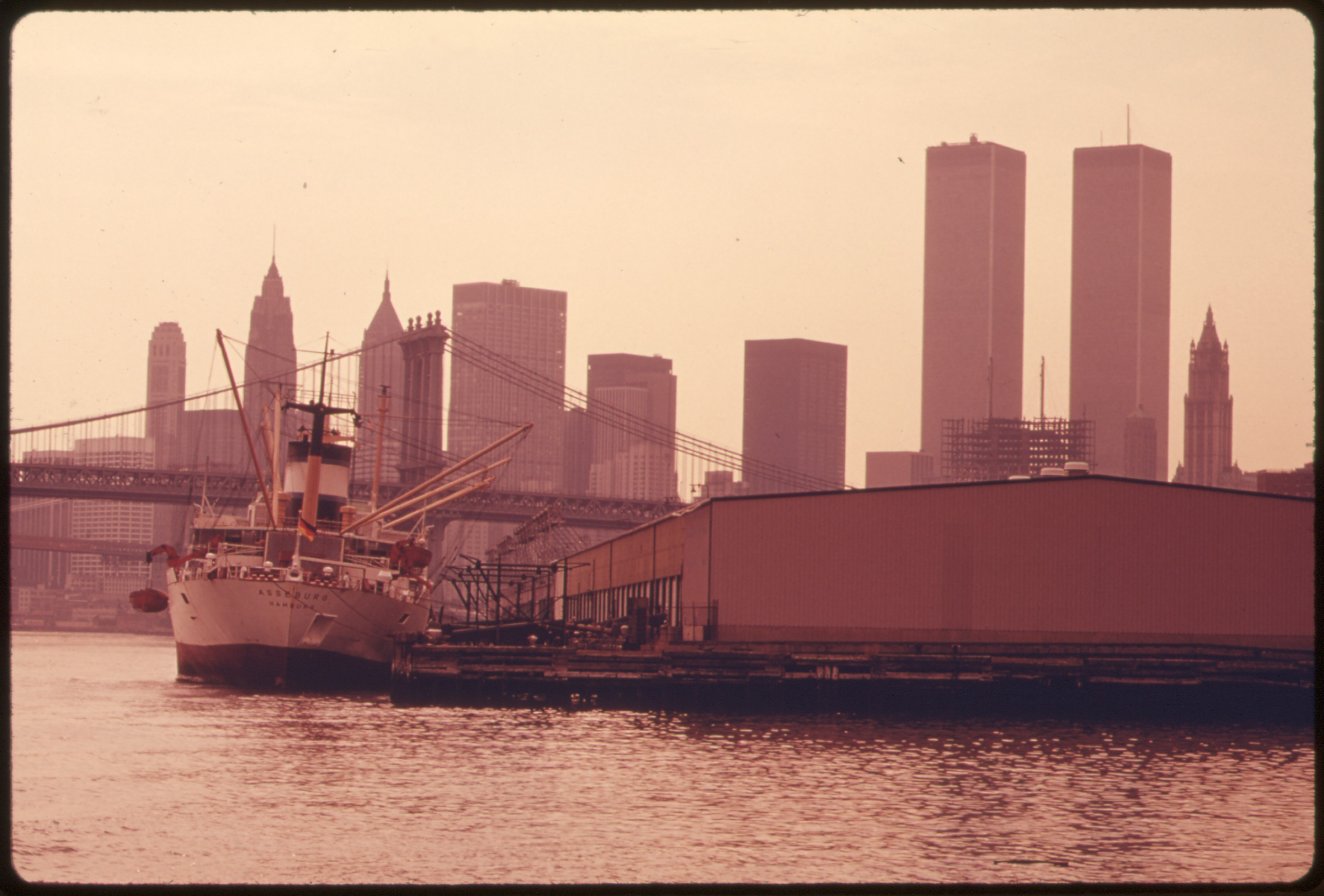
Pier 42 in 1974

Pier 42 is a pier on the Lower East Side of Manhattan, New York City. It was the last working cargo pier on the Manhattan shore of the East River, operating from 1963 to 1987. Since the early 2010s, plans have been underway to turn Pier 42 into a park.

== History ==
In the mid-19th century, sea trade in New York shifted to the deeper channels of the Hudson River, and the streets along the East River shore were developed with factories, and later with tenements housing various immigrant communities. The waterfront block of South Street opposite Pier 42 lingered on as an industrial area for a few more decades.

The pier was constructed in 1963 as a newsprint terminal. At the time, a fifth of all ocean-borne goods arriving in the United States came by ship to New York. At Pier 42, an estimated 935 million bananas arrived every year from Ecuador. It received its last shipment, a load of bananas, in November 1987. The high cost of labor and transportation, as well as the residential development of the shoreline neighborhoods spelled an end to Manhattan’s role as an international port of trade.

== Park conversion ==
With the pier’s closing, it sat unused for nearly two decades while the shore on either side was redeveloped as a series of linear parks comprising the Manhattan Waterfront Greenway, which nearly circumnavigates the urban island. Following the September 11, 2001 attacks at the World Trade Center, federal and state funding became available for park expansion projects as part of the revitalization of lower Manhattan. The heavy storm surge that flooded the neighborhood during Hurricane Sandy in October 2012 inspired community advocates to demand a design that would make Pier 42 a park with a function, serving as a soft storm barrier.

During Pier 42’s design phase the temporary project Paths to Pier 42 brought neighborhood residents, artists, designers and community organizations together to activate this park space with collaborative installations and public events to create more accessible green, open space on the waterfront.

Mathews Nielsen Landscape Architects is working on the design of this eight-acre waterfront park on Pier 42, with an emphasis on providing passive recreation space, soft barriers to storm surges, marine habitat, and ecological education opportunities. In deference to the park’s industrial past, a portion of the storage structure’s frame will be retained and used as a pavilion. The first space within the park, in the upland section, was scheduled to open in 2021. Construction began in March 2021, and a 2.3-acre (0.93 ha) deck with recreational fields opened in November 2022. The park at Pier 42 opened on July 3, 2024.

== See also ==
- East River Park
- List of New York City parks
- East River Esplanade
