= Anne Scripps =

American heiress to E. W. Scripps Co (1946–1994)

- Born: November 18, 1946; Albany, New York
- Died: January 6, 1994 (aged 47); Bronxville, New York
- Spouses: Anthony Morrell (m. 1969; div. 1988) Scott Douglas (m. 1988; murder–suicide 1994)
- Children: 3

Anne Scripps (November 18, 1946 – January 6, 1994) was an American heiress to the E. W. Scripps Company and the great-great granddaughter of James E. Scripps, founder of The Detroit News. In 1993, she was bludgeoned by her estranged second husband, Scott Douglas, as she slept in her Westchester County, New York, home.

== Family and marriages ==
Anne Frazier Scripps was born on November 18, 1946, to Captain James E. Scripps III, a former merchant mariner, and Anne Scripps (née Gibbs). She has a brother, James IV, and a sister, Mary. In 1969, when Scripps was 23 years of age, she married Anthony Morrell, a Rye stockbroker. The wedding was held in the St. Regis Hotel. The marriage resulted in two daughters, Alexandra and Anne. Scripps's marriage to Morrell ended in divorce. At a party in 1988, Scripps met Scott Douglas, an out-of-work and self-employed house painter. She hired him to paint her house, which led the two to marry that October. They had a daughter Victoria, nicknamed Tori. Douglas did not have a good relationship with Alexandra, who thought of him as not bright or articulate enough for her mother, and she quickly moved out of the house.

== Domestic violence and death ==
Scripps's daughters noticed that Douglas drank heavily and became erratically violent towards their mother, openly hitting her in public on at least one occasion. Both daughters advised their mother to file for divorce and get an order of eviction to have him removed from the home. In 1991, Scripps took Tori and moved in with Alexandra. She had changed her will and moved back in for fear that Douglas would take Tori and flee. During the holidays, she discovered Douglas had removed Tori's birth certificate and other personal records from the house. Scripps and her two eldest daughters began documenting and keeping records of the assaults, and on December 6, 1993, went to obtain an eviction notice; however, the judge refused to order his eviction. Scripps told a friend that she began sleeping with a hammer under her bed because Douglas's new method of abuse was to wake her up in the middle of the night to scare and berate her.

On December 31, 1993, Douglas bludgeoned Scripps with a hammer while she slept. Her daughter Anne had called the police on January 1, 1994, at 3:30 a.m., because she was unable to get into contact with her mother or Douglas. The police arrived and knocked down the locked door, and found Scripps unconscious in bed, her sheets soaked in blood, her terrier puppy next to her trying to comfort her. Across the hall Tori, then 3 years old, had witnessed the crime that left her mother's skull irreparably broken. Tori Douglas was reported as saying, "Daddy gave Mommy boo-boos. Daddy gave Mommy many boo-boos. Why is Mommy wearing warpaint?" Immediately the police began searching for Scott Douglas. In a matter of hours, Douglas's 1982 BMW was found on the Tappan Zee Bridge with the bloody hammer inside. The authorities dragged the Hudson River for him but operated under the assumption he was still alive. As Scripps lay in the hospital, her first husband, Anthony Morrell, who was in the terminal stages of cirrhosis of the liver and had been hospitalized near Philadelphia, left his hospital bed to be at her side. A week after the attack—two days after the authorities stopped dragging the Hudson for Douglas's body—on January 6, 1994, Scripps, at age 47, was taken off life support and died without regaining consciousness. After her death, she was able to give her liver, which was transplanted into her ex-husband, Anthony Morrell, saving his life. "Her daughters acted on what they knew would be their mother's wishes," said family attorney, "Anne left this world the way she lived in it—loving and giving."

== Resolution ==
In the days after Scripps's death, her family lashed out at the authorities who allowed Scott Douglas to remain in the home. Scripps's mother told the press, "This could have been prevented. My daughter would be alive today if that judge hadn't let him stay here. I think it's criminal."

The family alleged that the New Rochelle Family Court Judge Ingrid Braslow refused to grant an order barring Douglas from the house despite the assertions that he beat Anne and tried to shove her from the car. However, court documents show that these allegations relate to the 1991 case that was not before Braslow. The transcript of the December 6 hearing shows Braslow was not asked to remove Douglas from the home. The Scripps family filed an $11 million suit against the county which was later dismissed.

Three months after Anne Scripps's death, there was a break in the case when a railroad employee found the corpse of a man in jeans washed ashore in the Riverdale section of the Bronx. Dental records identified the corpse as Scott Stuart Douglas. The Scripps family met the news with relief. "It was a surprise, but the nightmare is over," stated Anne Morrell. "We don't have to worry anymore about him coming after us or Tori," said Alexandra Morrell.

Authorities re-examined the system that failed Anne Scripps, resulting in changes in Westchester County's domestic violence procedures. Scripps's ex-husband Anthony Morrell died in 2005.

== Family aftermath ==
On September 25, 2009, The Huffington Post reported that Anne's daughter Anne had jumped to her death from the Tappan Zee Bridge. Authorities found a note and believed Anne got out of her car and jumped off the bridge the evening of September 24, 2009. Three days later, her body was found in the Hudson. The contents of the suicide note were released by an interview on ABC's 20/20 in 2010. Family friends stated that Anne never got over her mother's murder and she had been hospitalized several times for major depression. At the time of her death she had a son named Michael.

In 2011, Tori, who had been raised in Vermont after being adopted by her mother's sister, Mary Scripps Carmody, and her husband, Robert, was arrested in Burlington, Vermont, for possession of heroin. She was subsequently convicted of drug-related crimes and served time in prison. In 2018, Tori was arrested for possession of stolen property after she pawned the heirloom jewelry of her adoptive mother and stole her car. On March 1, 2023, Scripps Carmody was arrested in Raleigh, North Carolina, on charges of second degree trespass.
