= Tappan Zee Bridge (1955–2017) =

Former bridge in New York

Tappan Zee Bridge (Governor Malcolm Wilson Tappan Zee Bridge)
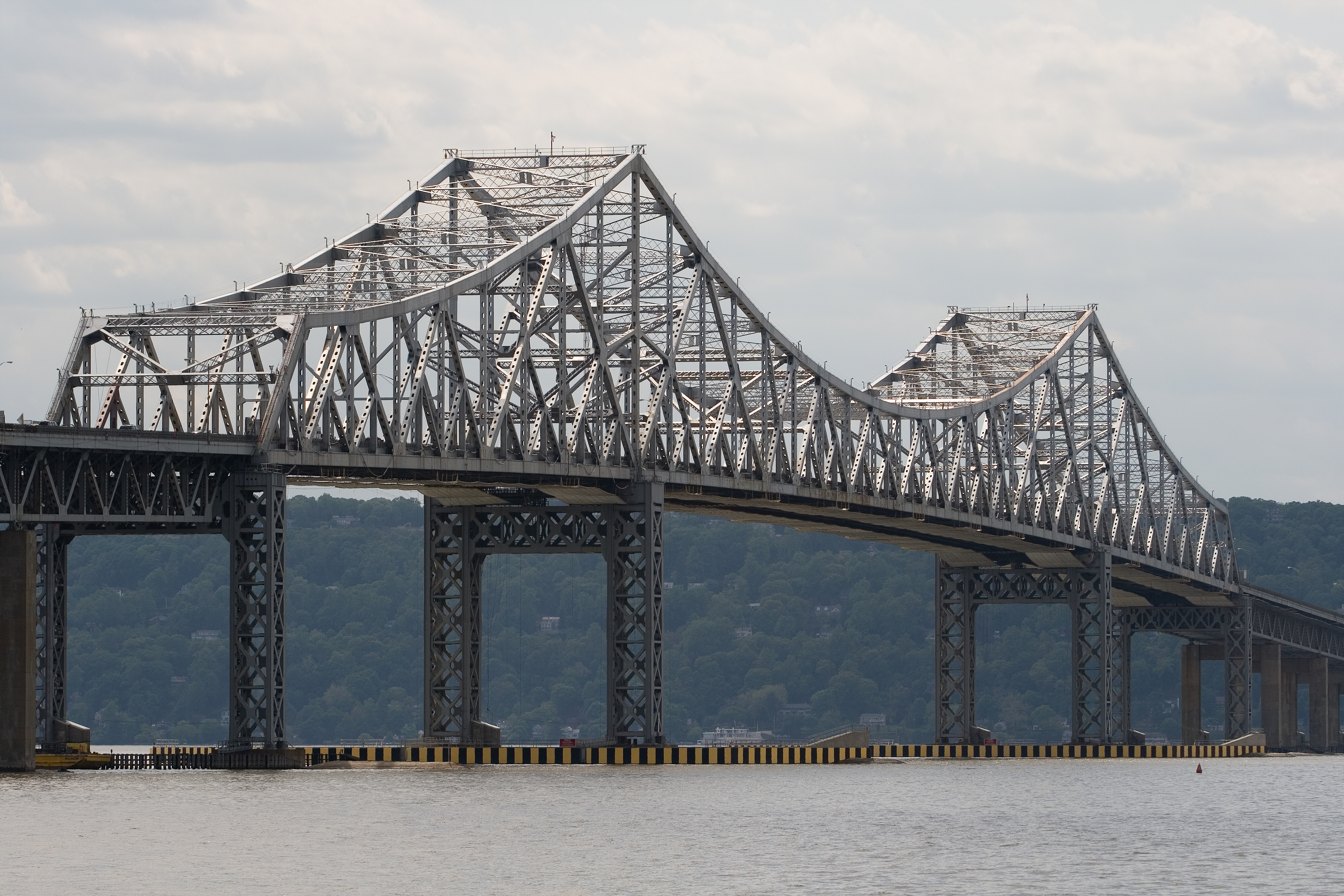
- The Tappan Zee Bridge as seen from Tarrytown, 2007
- Coordinates: 41°04′12″N 73°53′28″W
- Carried: 7 lanes of I-87 / I-287 / New York Thruway
- Crossed: Hudson River
- Locale: Connecting South Nyack, Rockland County, New York and Tarrytown, Westchester County, New York in the Lower Hudson Valley
- Official name: Governor Malcolm Wilson Tappan Zee Bridge
- Maintained by: New York State Thruway Authority

Characteristics
- Design: Cantilever bridge
- Total length: 16,013 feet (4,881 m; 3 mi)
- Width: 90 feet (27 m)
- Longest span: 1,212 feet (369 m)
- Clearance below: 138 feet (42 m)

History
- Constructed by: American Bridge Company
- Opened: December 15, 1955
- Destroyed: January 15, 2019 (eastern span); May 12, 2019 (western span)
- Closed: October 6, 2017
- Replaced by: Tappan Zee Bridge (2017–present)

Statistics
- Daily traffic: 134,947 (2010)

Location
- Interactive map of Tappan Zee Bridge (Governor Malcolm Wilson Tappan Zee Bridge)

The Tappan Zee Bridge (English pronunciation: /ˌtæpən ˈziː/), officially named Governor Malcolm Wilson Tappan Zee Bridge, was a cantilever bridge in the U.S. state of New York. It was built from 1952 to 1955 to cross the Hudson River at one of its widest points, 25 miles (40 km) north of Midtown Manhattan, from South Nyack to Tarrytown. As an integral conduit within the New York Metropolitan Area, the bridge connected South Nyack in Rockland County with Tarrytown in Westchester County in the Lower Hudson Valley.

Opened on December 15, 1955, the Tappan Zee Bridge was one of the primary crossings of the Hudson River north of New York City; it carried much of the traffic between southern New England and points west of the Hudson. The bridge was the longest in New York State, a title retained by its replacement. The total length of the bridge approached 16,013 feet (3.0328 mi; 4,881 m). The cantilever span was 1,212 feet (369 m), which provided a maximum clearance of 138 feet (42 m) over the water. The bridge was officially named after former governor Malcolm Wilson in 1994, though the original name continued to be used.

The Tappan Zee Bridge was part of the New York State Thruway mainline and carried the highway concurrency of Interstate 87 and Interstate 287. The span carried seven lanes of motor traffic. The center lane was able to be switched between eastbound and westbound traffic depending on the prevalent commuter direction; on weekdays the center lane was eastbound in the morning and westbound in the evening. The switch was accomplished via a movable center barrier which was moved by a pair of barrier transfer machines. Even with the switchable lane, traffic was frequently very slow.

In 2013, federal and state authorities started constructing a replacement bridge at a cost of at least $4 billion. All traffic was shifted to the new bridge on October 6, 2017, and demolition of the old bridge began soon afterward. The eastern half of the bridge was demolished in a controlled demolition on January 15, 2019, while the western half was lowered onto a barge and hauled away in May 2019. The Tappan Zee is named for an American Indian tribe from the area called "Tappan"; and zee being the Dutch word for "sea".

== History ==
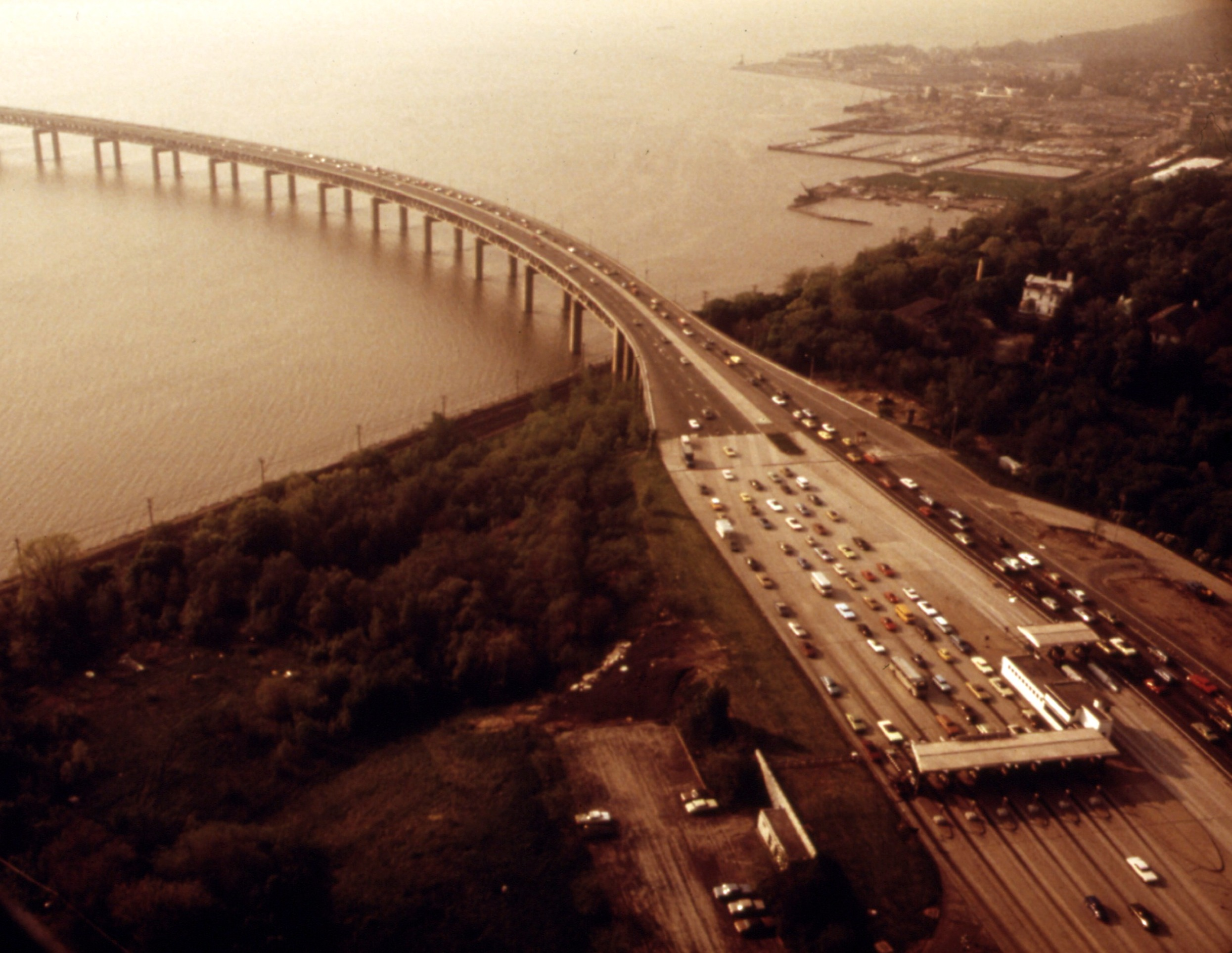
Tappan Zee Bridge toll plaza, 1973, as seen from the Westchester County side

With the increasing demands for commuter travel taxing the existing bridges and tunnels, the Port Authority of New York and New Jersey had plans in 1950 to construct a bridge across the Hudson near Dobbs Ferry, New York. The proposal was overridden by New York State Governor Thomas E. Dewey, who wanted to construct a bridge to connect the New York State Thruway across Westchester to the New England Thruway. The Port Authority promised its bondholders that it would not allow any other entity to construct a river crossing within its jurisdiction, which reached to a point one mile (1.6 km) south of Nyack on the western shore of the Hudson River and across to Tarrytown on the eastern shore.

A May 10, 1950, editorial in The New York Times suggested that a site in southern Dobbs Ferry or northern Hastings-on-Hudson, where the Hudson narrowed considerably from its three-mile (5 km) width at Tappan Zee, would be a more appropriate site, and suggested that Governor Dewey work with his counterpart, Governor of New Jersey Alfred E. Driscoll, to craft a compromise that would offer Thruway customers a discounted bridge fare at a more southerly crossing. Two days later, Governor Dewey announced that the Port Authority had dropped its plans to construct a bridge of its own, and that the bridge's location would be close to the Tarrytown-Nyack line, just outside the Port Authority's jurisdiction. Dewey stated that World War II military technology would be used in the bridge's construction.

The site of the bridge, at the Hudson River's second-widest point, added to construction costs. The site was chosen to be as close as possible to New York City, while staying out of the 25-mile (40 km) range of the Port Authority's influence, thus ensuring that revenue from collected tolls would go to the newly created New York State Thruway Authority, and not the Port Authority. A unique aspect of the design of the bridge was that the main span was supported by eight hollow concrete caissons. Their buoyancy supported some of the loads and helped reduce costs.

The bridge was designed by Emil Praeger of the Madigan-Hyland engineering firm. Captain Praeger helped develop floating caissons during World War II when the Allied forces needed to create and protect portable harbors for the 1944 invasion of Normandy. Black architect and engineer Donald F. White had also worked on the bridge design.

Construction started in March 1952 and the bridge opened to traffic on December 15, 1955, along with a 27-mile (43 km) long section of the New York State Thruway from Suffern to Yonkers. The bridge was built on a very tight budget of $81 million (1950 dollars), or $1.08 billion in 2024 dollars.

New York State Governor W. Averell Harriman signed a bill on February 28, 1956, to officially name the structure the Tappan Zee Bridge.

In 1960, the bridge was redecked, additionally, it was given a new metallic safety barrier.

Originally, tolls were collected in both directions. In August 1970, the toll was abolished for westbound drivers, and at the same time, eastbound drivers saw their tolls doubled. The tolls of eleven other New York–New Jersey and Hudson River crossings along a 130-mile (210 km) stretch, from the Outerbridge Crossing in the south to the Rip Van Winkle Bridge in the north, were also changed to eastbound-only at that time.

In an effort to reduce congestion, the median was replaced by a seventh travel lane in 1987, this meant making the other six lanes narrower.

A zipper barrier was installed in 1992.

In 1994, the name of Malcolm Wilson was added to the bridge's name upon the 20th anniversary of his leaving the governor's office in December 1974. However, it was almost never used when the bridge was spoken about colloquially.

The bridge was refurbished in 2008.

It was redecked in 2010.

== Replacement bridge ==
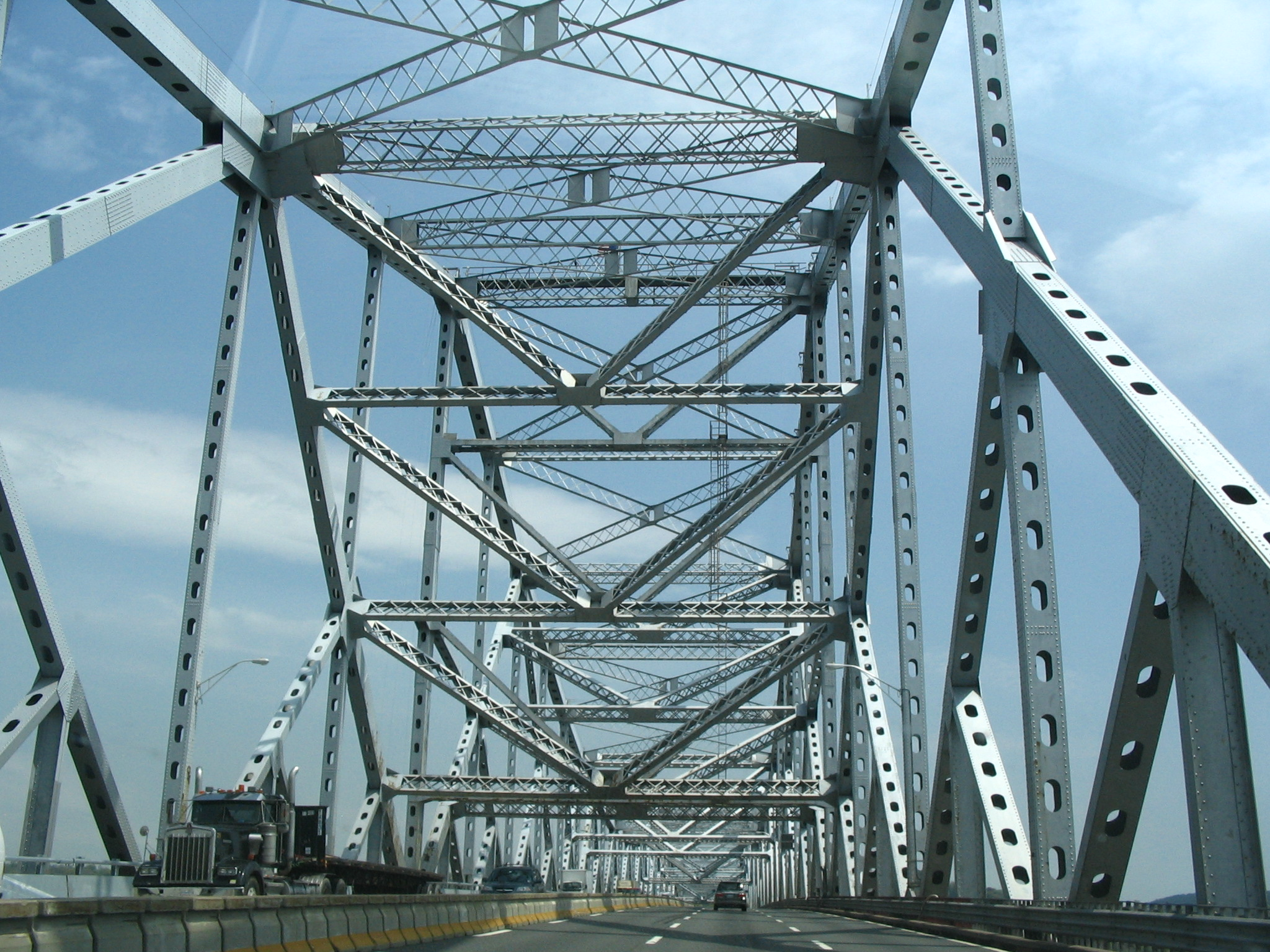
The superstructure, which was constructed during a period of material shortages during the Korean War

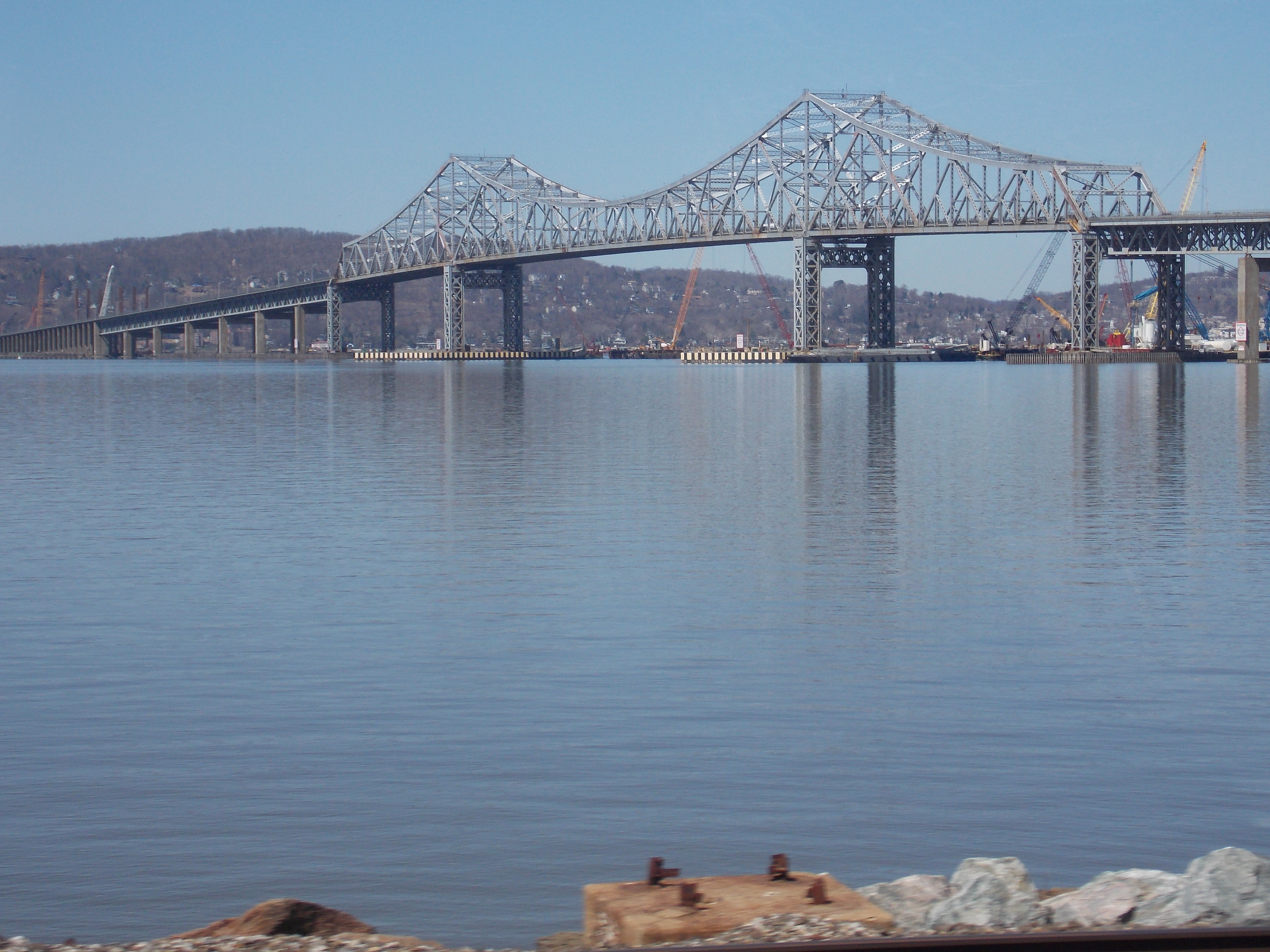
Original Tappan Zee Bridge, as seen from an Amtrak Train in 2015

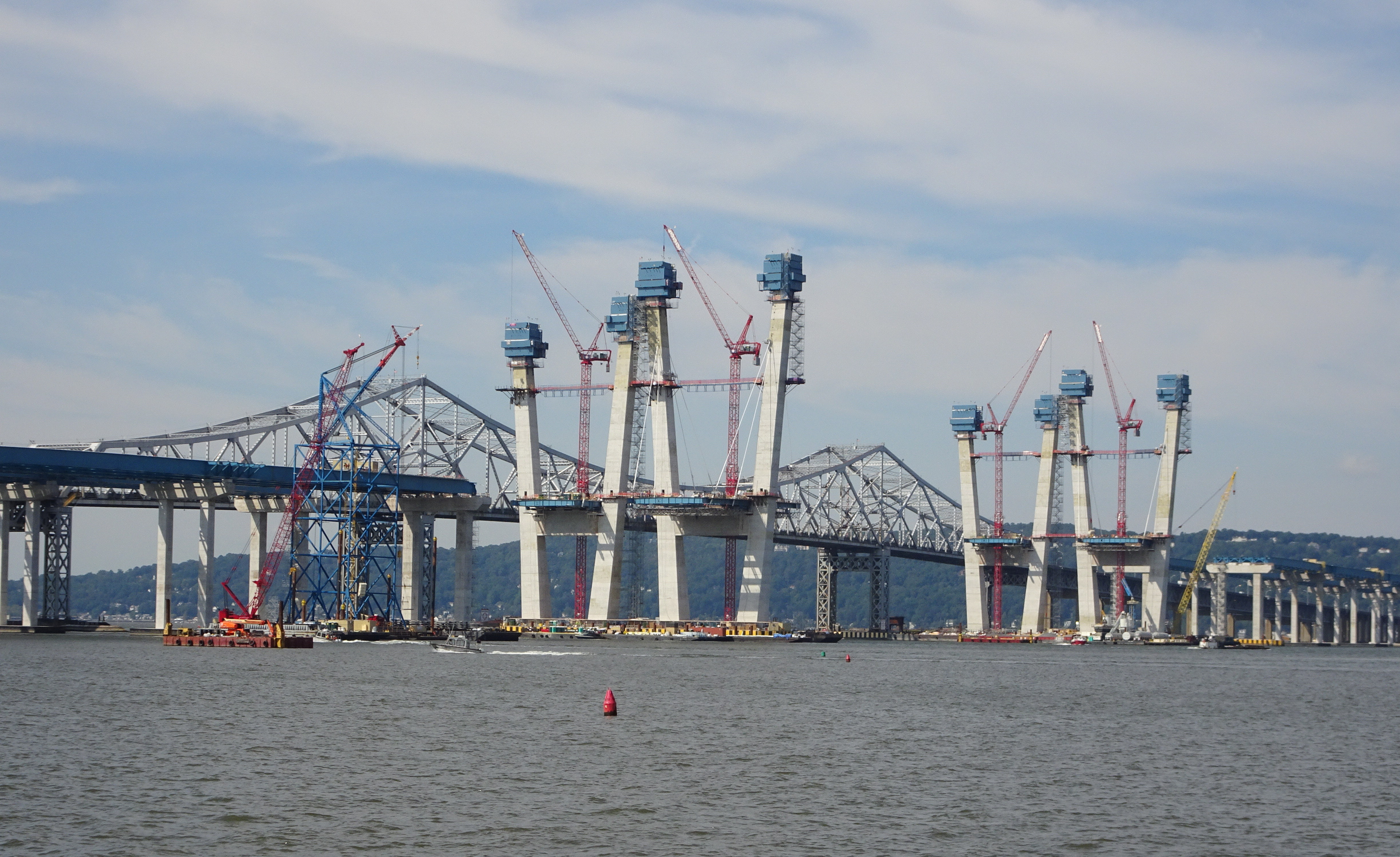
The new Tappan Zee Bridge being constructed next to the original

=== Planning and construction ===
Since the end of the 20th century, calls to replace the aging Tappan Zee Bridge had gone unanswered. The deteriorating structure bore an average of 138,000 vehicles per day by the end of its life, substantially more traffic than its designed capacity. Unlike other major bridges in metropolitan New York, the Tappan Zee was designed to last only 50 years due to material shortages during the Korean War at the time of its construction. In total, the bridge was open for 61 years, 9 months, and 21 days. The new bridge is intended to last at least 100 years without any major repairs.

The collapse of Minnesota's I-35W Mississippi River bridge in 2007 raised worries about the Tappan Zee's structural integrity. These concerns, together with traffic overcapacity and increased maintenance costs, escalated the serious discussions already ongoing about replacing the Tappan Zee with a tunnel or a new bridge. Six options were identified and submitted for project study and environmental review.

In 2009, the Tappan Zee Bridge was featured on The History Channel "The Crumbling of America" showing the infrastructure crisis in the United States. Many factors contributed to the precarious infrastructure of the bridge, which has been called "one of the most decrepit and potentially dangerous bridges" in the U.S. Engineering assessments determined that "everything from steel corrosion to earthquakes to maritime accidents could cause major, perhaps catastrophic, damage to the span," prompting one of the top aides in the New York state governor's office to refer to the Tappan Zee as the "hold-your-breath bridge." A 2009 state report noted that the bridge was not built with a plan that was "conducive to long-term durability" and that the Tappan Zee's engineers designed it to be "nonredundant," meaning that one "critical fracture could make the bridge fail completely because its supports couldn't transfer the structure's load to other supports."

The Metropolitan Transportation Authority (MTA) studied the feasibility of either including a rail line across the new bridge or building the new bridge so a new rail line can be installed at a future date. Commuter rail service west of the bridge in Rockland County is limited, and the MTA studied expansion possibilities in Rockland County that would use the new bridge to connect with Metro-North's Hudson Line on the east side of the bridge along the Hudson River for direct service into Manhattan. On September 26, 2008, New York state officials announced their plan to replace the Tappan Zee Bridge with a new bridge that included high-speed bus lanes and space for future commuter-train tracks. The bridge was estimated to cost $6.4 billion, while adding bus lanes from Suffern to Port Chester was estimated to cost an additional $2.9 billion. Adding a rail line from the Suffern Metro-North station and across the bridge, connecting with Metro-North's Hudson Line south of Tarrytown, would have added another $6.7 billion. The plan was reviewed for its environmental impacts.

In 2013, the New York State Thruway Authority began building the new Tappan Zee Bridge, a double-span bridge (four lanes per span in opposite directions) with designated bus lanes, to the north of the old bridge. Construction began as scheduled during 2013, with completion projected for 2017.

=== Closure and demolition of old span ===
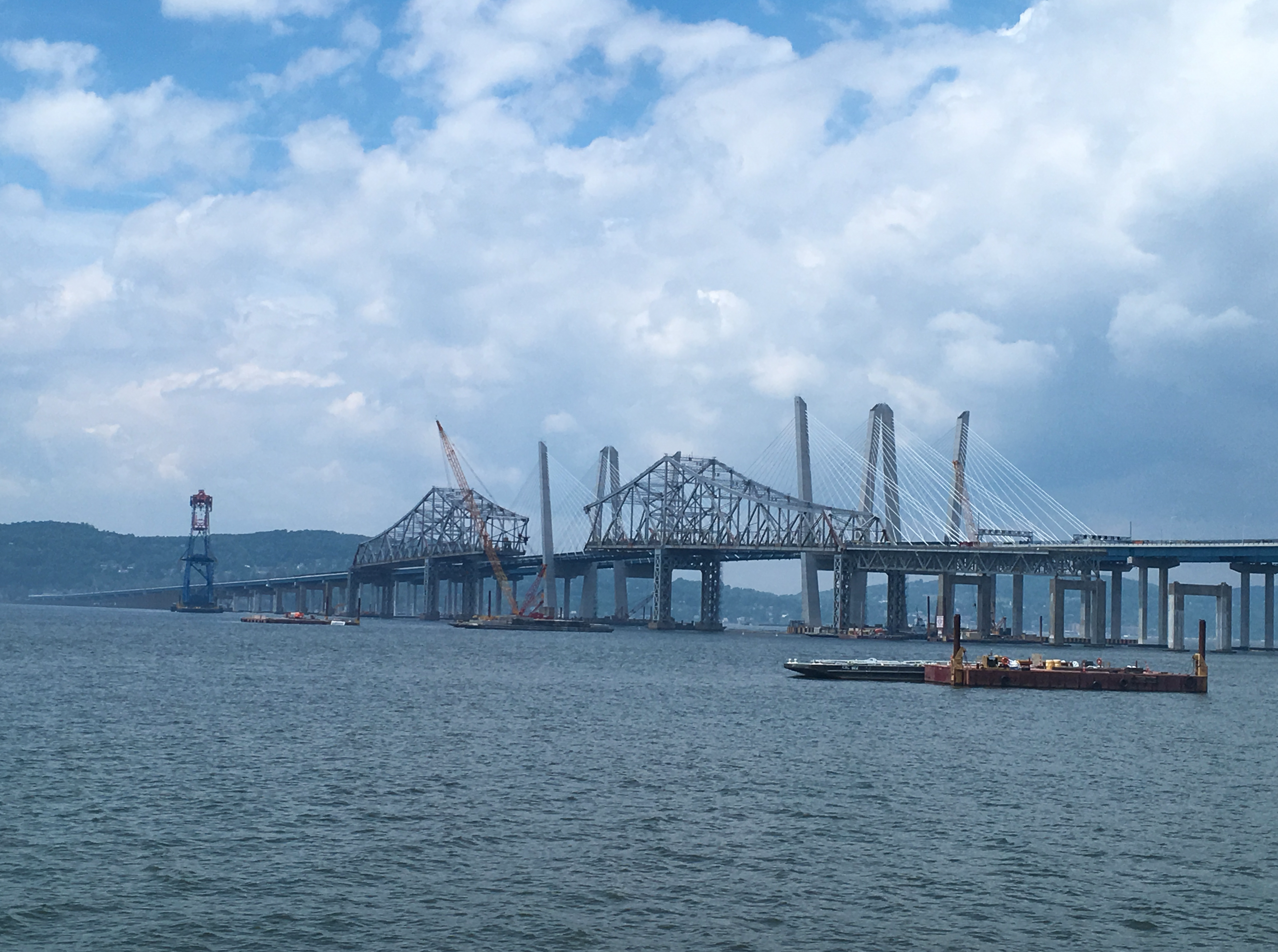
Dismantling of the original bridge

Explosive demolition of the east span

The new northbound/westbound span opened on August 25, 2017. The zipper barrier was then removed, and southbound/eastbound traffic remained on the old span until October 7, 2017, when it was temporarily shifted to the newer northbound/westbound span. The old bridge was subsequently decommissioned. The replacement bridge project was expected to be completed by June 15, 2018 at a cost of $3.98 billion. After some delays, it was announced that the new southbound/eastbound span would open to traffic on September 8, 2018. However, the opening of the new eastbound span was delayed when a piece of the old bridge came loose on September 7 while being demolished. The eastbound span, which was 160 feet (49 m) away from the old bridge, remained closed until the old bridge could be stabilized.

The old bridge was then demolished in piecemeal fashion in order to minimize impacts on the Hudson River's wildlife and marine traffic. 135 deck panels that were assembled onto the old bridge recently as part of emergency repairs would be sold to local governments for a dollar each so that local governments can build new bridges. Other parts of the old bridge would be sunk off the Atlantic Ocean coast as part of New York State's artificial reef program. In May 2018, the state government began sinking parts of the old bridge to make 12 artificial reefs.

On January 2, 2019, it was announced that the eastern approach to the old bridge would be demolished with explosives on January 12. However, it was postponed due to high winds. It was demolished on January 15, 2019. The western approach was lowered onto a barge and hauled away beginning on May 12, 2019 and lasting several days.

== Suicide prevention ==
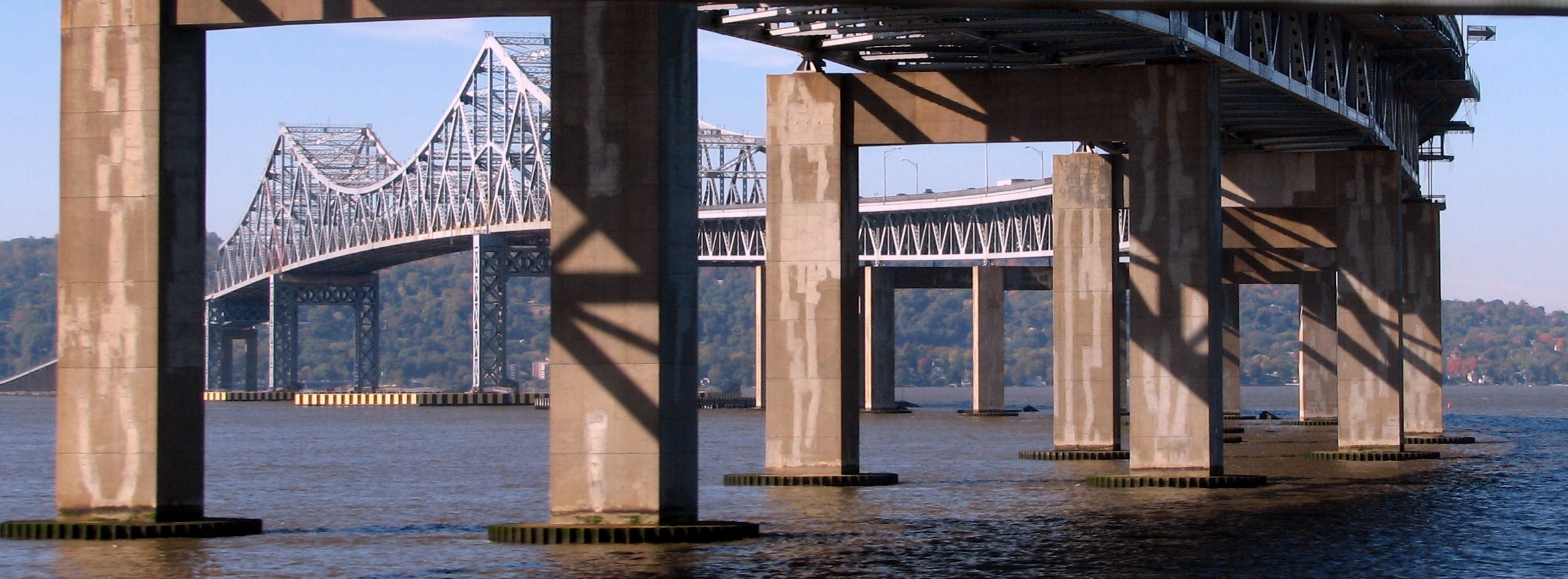
The Tappan Zee Bridge as seen from a train on the eastern shore of the Hudson River

From 1998 to 2008, more than 25 people committed suicide on the Tappan Zee Bridge, according to the New York State Thruway Authority.

On August 31, 2007, NYSTA officials added four phones – two each on the Rockland and Westchester sides – that connect callers via the National Suicide Prevention Lifeline crisis hotline to counselors at LifeNet or Covenant House. Signs reading "Life is Worth Living" and "When it seems like there is no hope, there is help" were placed on the bridge. Suicide fencing and traffic cameras were also installed along the bridge, and bridge staff were trained in suicide prevention. On October 14, 2012, Newsday reported that the Tappan Zee Bridge was called the Golden Gate Bridge of the East and that the "new Tappan Zee, which is in the works, will include fencing designed to thwart jumpers."

Suicides on the Tappan Zee Bridge included those of Scott Douglas on January 6, 1994 – after murdering his wife, newspaper heiress Anne Scripps – and of Douglas's stepdaughter Anne Morrell Petrillo, who jumped to her death on September 24, 2009. A US military employee jumped from the bridge to her death in 2010.

== See also ==
- List of bridges documented by the Historic American Engineering Record in New York
- List of fixed crossings of the Hudson River
