= Flow Separation =

External videos
- Montage from the Public Art Fund

Flow Separation is a red and white, marbled repainting of the John J. Harvey fireboat by artist Tauba Auerbach. The project was a collaboration with the Public Art Fund and 14-18 NOW, a British centenary arts program that has sponsored ship repaintings in the spirit of World War I dazzle camouflage.
