= Pier 66 =

Pier 66 may refer to:

- North River Pier 66, a public boathouse on the Hudson River in Manhattan, New York, US
- Pier 66 Maritime, a former railroad barge in Manhattan, New York, US; used to dock historic ships and also the location of a bar & grill with entertainment (formerly known as Pier 63 Maritime)
- Pier 66, or Bell Street Pier, a major complex on the downtown waterfront of Seattle, Washington, US
- Pier 66 (film), a 1996 film
