= Hudson River Park =

Public park in Manhattan, New York

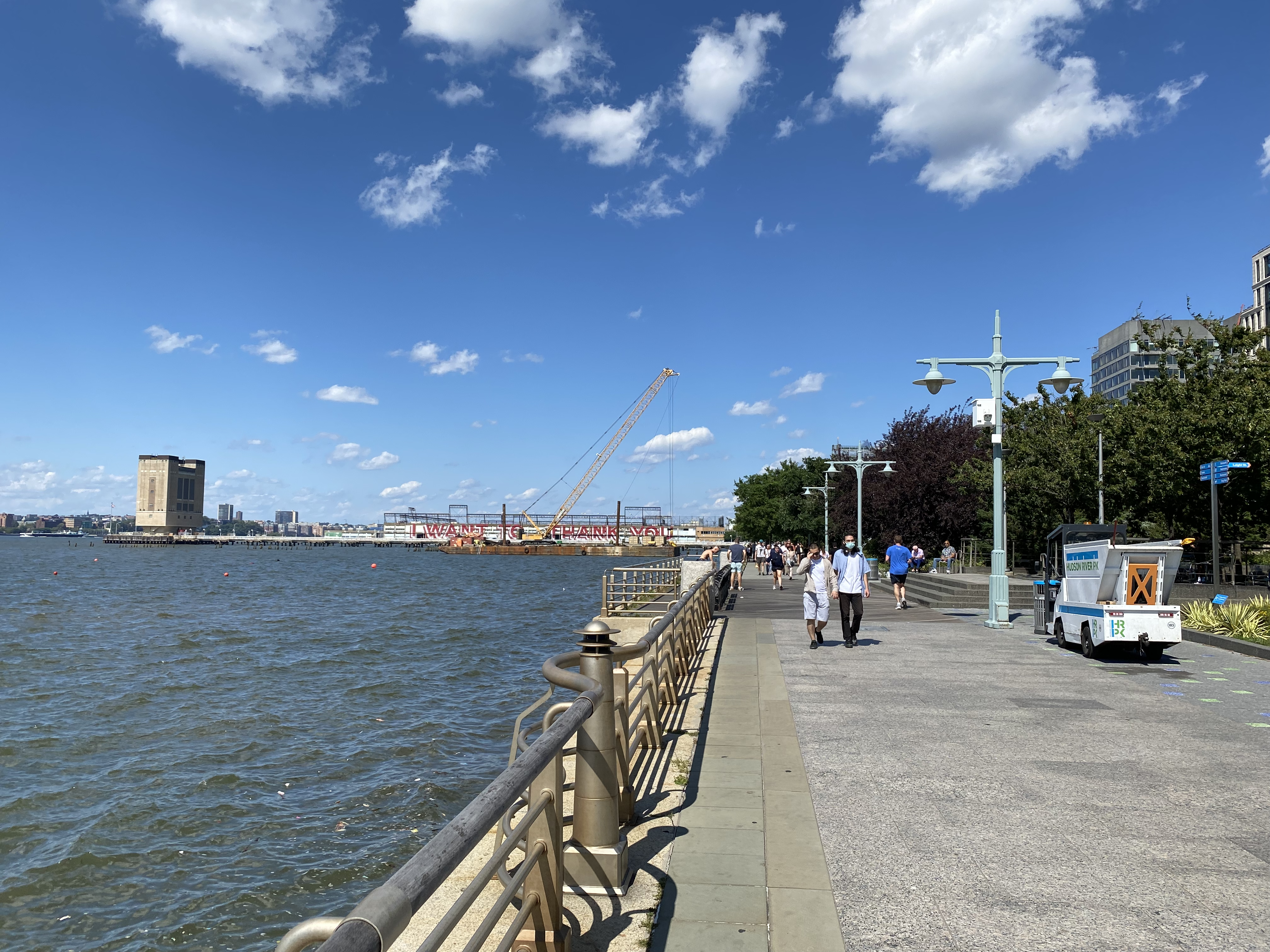
- Tribeca pedestrian section
- Interactive map of Hudson River Park
- Type: Urban park Riverfront park Estuarine sanctuary
- Location: Between Battery Place and West 59th Street; West Side, Manhattan, New York City
- Area: 550 acres (220 ha)
- Opened: July 23, 1998
- Operator: State of New York; City of New York; Hudson River Park Trust
- Visitors: 17 million (in 2015)
- Status: Open
- Hiking trails: 4 miles (6.4 km)
- Website: www.hudsonriverpark.org

Hudson River Park is a waterfront park and marine reserve along the Hudson River on the west side of Manhattan in New York City. The 4.5-mile (7.2 km) linear park extends from 59th Street south to Battery Park and comprises part of the Hudson River Greenway. After Central Park, it is the second-largest park in Manhattan at 550 acres (220 ha), including 400 acres (160 ha) of the river itself protected as the Estuarine Sanctuary.

Hudson River Park is a joint state and city collaboration, but is organized as a New York State public-benefit corporation. Plans for the park were devised in the late 1980s following the cancellation of the Westway plan, which had proposed an interstate highway to replace the deteriorated West Side Elevated Highway. The park was established in 1998 and was built in several stages in conjunction with the construction of the surface-level West Side Highway. Additional phases were completed between the 2000s and the 2020s.

Hudson River Park connects many other recreational sites and landmarks. It runs through the Manhattan neighborhoods of Lower Manhattan (including Battery Park City, World Trade Center, and Tribeca), Greenwich Village (including the West Village and Meatpacking District), Chelsea, and Midtown West (which includes Hudson Yards and Hell's Kitchen/Clinton). The park connects two other waterfront parks: Riverside Park to the north and The Battery to the south.

Bicycle and pedestrian paths, spanning the park north to south, open up the waterfront for recreational use. The park includes tennis and soccer fields, batting cages, children's playground, dog run, and many other features. The parkland also incorporates several rebuilt North River piers along its length, formerly used for shipping.

== Management ==
The Hudson River Park Trust is a partnership between New York State and New York City charged with the design, construction and operation of the four-mile Hudson River Park. The trust operates on a premise of financial self-sufficiency, supporting the staff as well as the operations and maintenance of the park through revenue generated within the park by rents from commercial tenants, fees, concession revenues, grants and donations. Capital funding has historically come primarily from the state, the city, and Federal budget appropriations. The trust is guided by a thirteen-member Board of Directors. There is also a fifty-member Advisory Council which plays an integral role in the park planning process. The management team is headed by Noreen Doyle, President and CEO. In 2017, the trust had operating expenses of $31.38 million and a level of staffing of 117 people.

== History ==
=== Land use ===
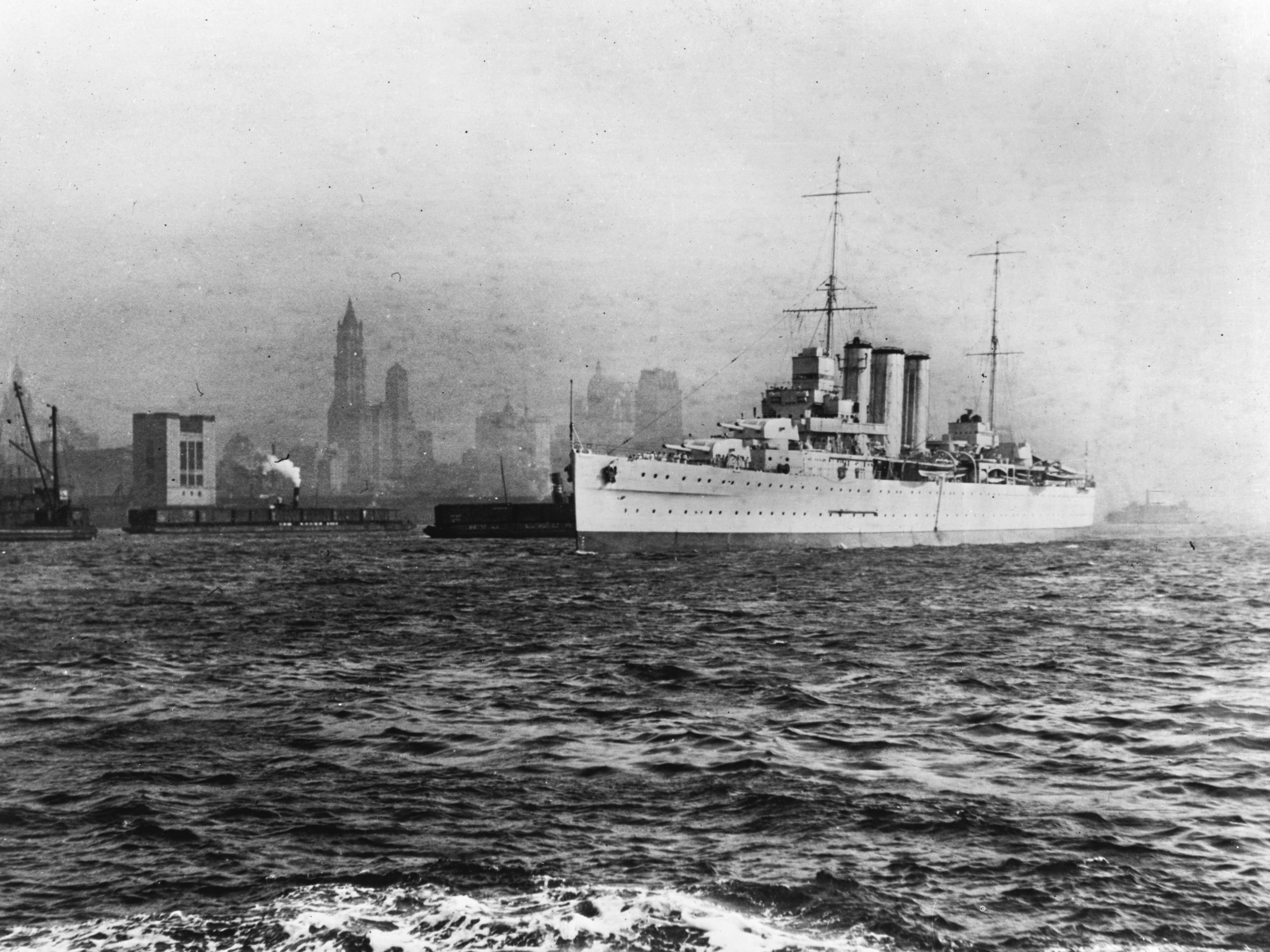
Looking east across lower Manhattan, from the middle of the Hudson River just north of Christopher Street in the West Village, c. 1932-1933

Prior to colonization of New Netherland, Native Americans lived on the shore of the southernmost portion of the Hudson River—where the park now is—seasonally, in a place called Sapohanikan. It was near the present-day intersection of Gansevoort Street and Washington Street. It was probably a hunting and fishing site, and Native Americans probably used the oyster reefs on the shore as well; the newly settled Europeans also began using these reefs.

Later, oyster barges, selling high volumes of oysters, opened along the Hudson River shore, within several North River piers. Because of their quantity, they were often sold at cheap prices, and many immigrants to New York City relied on eating oysters. These oyster barges closed when the oysters died due to overfarming and to water pollution resulting from the shore's industrialization.

In 1807, the first steamboat in passenger operation, Clermont, was launched from present-day Pier 45, in the West Village. The first successful boat of its kind in the United States, it helped give Robert Fulton control over all steamboat operations on the rest of the Hudson River. The English White Star Line, including the Olympic and the Titanic, had a terminal at Pier 59. The competing Cunard Line was located at Pier 54, and this location received survivors of the sinking of the Titanic rescued by the Carpathia in 1912, as well as being the departure point for the ill-fated Lusitania, which was sunk by a German U-boat in 1915.

By the late 19th century, the Slaughterhouse District was created along the Hudson River shoreline in present-day Hell's Kitchen. A stretch of 39th Street between 11th and 12th Avenues was called Abattoir Place until the early 20th century. In the 1870s, tunnels to herd cattle under 12th Avenue were created at 34th and 38th Streets. The cattle industry in this area continued through the 1960s.

=== Conception and construction ===
What is now Hudson River Park emerged from the failed 1970s and 1980s Westway proposal to replace the dilapidated West Side Highway with an interstate highway connecting the Brooklyn–Battery Tunnel (I-478), the Holland Tunnel (I-78), and the Lincoln Tunnel (then I-495). The right-of-way of the new six-lane highway would have demolished the then-existing West Side piers and replaced them with 220 acres (89 ha) of landfill, through which the new highway would have tunneled. In addition to 100 acres (40 ha) of development, the plan also had provisions for 98 acres (40 ha) of continuous parkland to be laid on top of the highway, including four waterside parks and a three-mile-long (4.8 km) tree-lined promenade and bike path on the waterfront. Around 90% of the funds for the project were to come from federal aid. The project was abandoned on September 19, 1985, due to political as well as environmental objections, particularly concerns in Congress over excessive cost as well as concerns by federal courts over the Hudson River striped bass habitat. Much of the estimated $2 billion in federal funds allocated for the Westway was diverted to mass transit. Plans for the park still persisted, with $265 million of the park's proposed $500 million cost having been secured by 1990. The park would be built on all of the land not occupied by the future West Side Highway, as well as the remaining piers.

During the 1980s and 1990s, there were plans to redevelop many of the old piers as parkland. A new plan for development was announced in 1992 by then-Governor Mario Cuomo and then-Mayor David Dinkins, targeting Pier 76 opposite the Javits Center, Chelsea Piers, and Pier 40 as key locations for commercial development that would support the park. The 1992 memorandum also created the Hudson River Park Corporation, quickly renamed the Hudson River Park Conservancy, a government agency composed of members appointed by the governor and mayor.

Construction of the Chelsea Piers complex began in July 1994, opening in stages beginning in May 1995. Legislation creating the park was signed in September 1998 by Governor George Pataki, combining land owned by New York State (the southern half, from Battery Park to 35th Street) and the city (the northern half, from 35th Street to 59th). Both halves were leased to the joint entity now known as the Hudson River Park Trust. The plan also guaranteed that half of two commercial locations, Piers 40 and 76, and all of Pier 84, would be reserved for parkland. The park was initially expected to be completed by 2003, with construction costs estimated at $300 million. The first complete section of the park started construction in 1998 and opened in 2003 in Greenwich Village.

Afterward, construction stalled, and much of the park remained incomplete. Clinton Cove opened in 2005, and Piers 66 and 84 opened the next year. Half of the park was complete by 2009, and as of 2015, seventy percent of the park has been finished, at a cost of nearly $500 million.

=== 2010s and 2020s ===
Parts of the Hudson River Park remained without power in the months after Hurricane Sandy in October 2012, due to damaged electrical cables. As a result, the Hudson River Park temporarily limited hours after nightfall in the park. Before Hurricane Sandy, the park's paths alongside the river remained open until 1 am EDT. After Hurricane Sandy, the park worked to return to normal operating hours once they restored power to affected areas. Full power was restored in June 2014, 20 months after the storm, with total damages accumulating to $32 million. By June 2013, the Hudson River Park trust was in debt. A bill passed in June 2013 ended maintenance of a section of the park in Battery Park City, as well as the purchase of liability insurance, which would give $750,000 in savings to the park. However, the park was to run a $8.5 million deficit for fiscal year 2014. To further ameliorate the debt, the bill provided for the trust to make passengers pay to board sightseeing cruise ships in the park. Finally, the bill allowed the park to sell air rights across the street from the park, specifically St. John's Terminal across from Pier 40. In addition, Pier 40, which would have garnered large profits for the park, would cost more than $100 million to renovate.

In 2014, the Hudson River Park Trust planned a river-ecology research center at Pier 26 in Tribeca, to be run by Clarkson University. In October 2017, as part of a plan to reactivate the Pier 54 project (see § Notable piers), Andrew Cuomo agreed to complete the remaining 30% of the park.

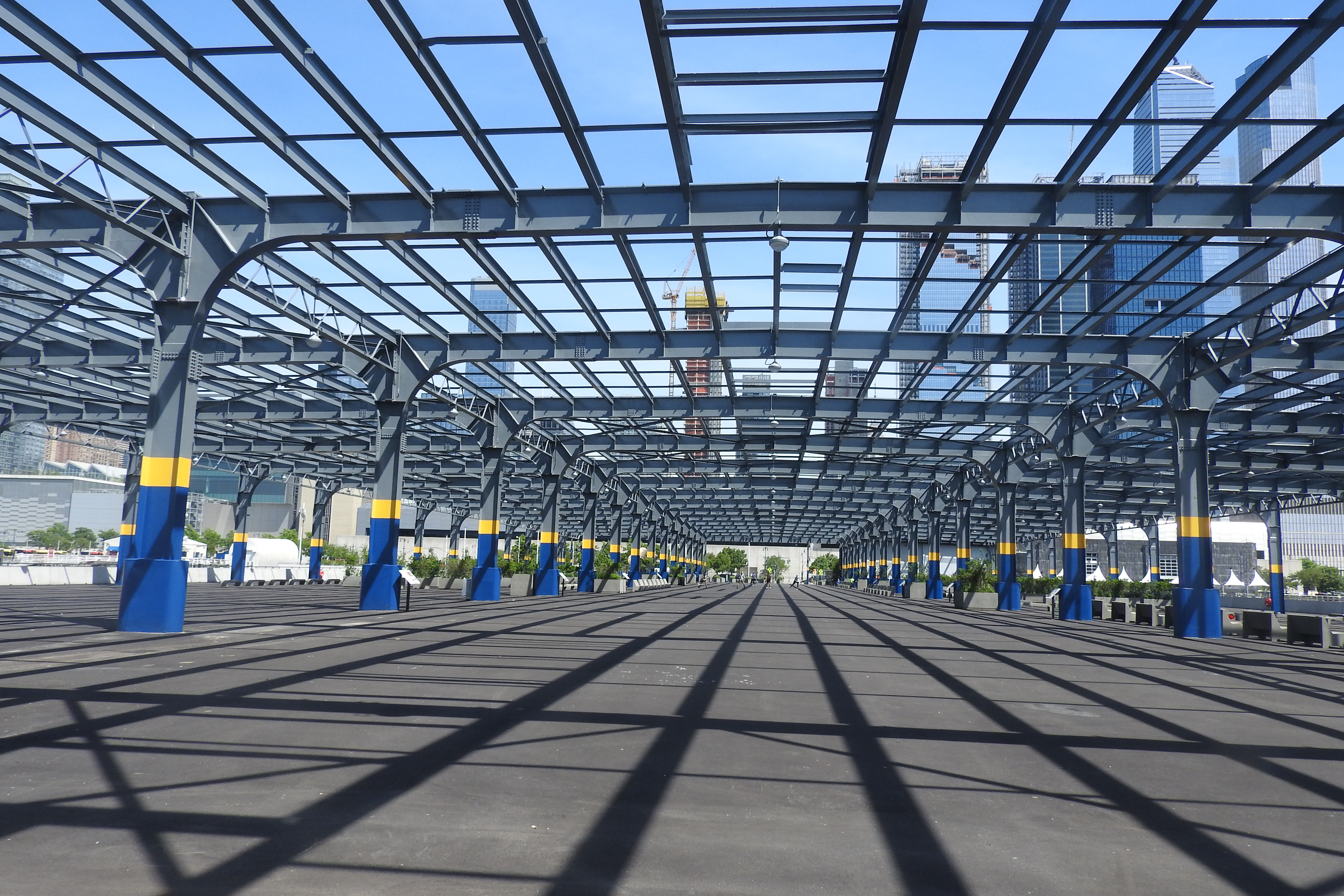
Pier 76 open in June 2021

The state's first memorial to the LGBT community was dedicated in June 2018, at Hudson River Park near the Christopher Street Pier. The memorial, an abstract work by Anthony Goicolea, consists of nine boulders arranged in a circle. The memorial honors the victims of the 2016 Orlando nightclub shooting, most of whom were gay. The Pier 54 project, later renamed Little Island, opened in May 2021. Additionally, in early 2020, Cuomo announced that he would expand the park onto Pier 76, which contained a New York City Police Department tow pound that was in the process of closing. Pier 76 opened on June 9, 2021, under the existing canopy of the former tow pound. In 2022, Manhattan borough president Mark Levine proposed converting one lane of the West Side Highway into a bike path due to heavy traffic on Hudson River Park's bike lane. Gansevoort Peninsula opened in the West Village in late 2023. By then, the park attracted 17 million annual visitors and had spurred commercial development along the West Side, including the IAC Building and a redevelopment of St. John's Terminal.

== Description and amenities ==
Hudson River Park is a 550-acre waterfront public park that stretches for 4.5 miles (7.2 km) along the west side of Manhattan.

=== Recreation ===
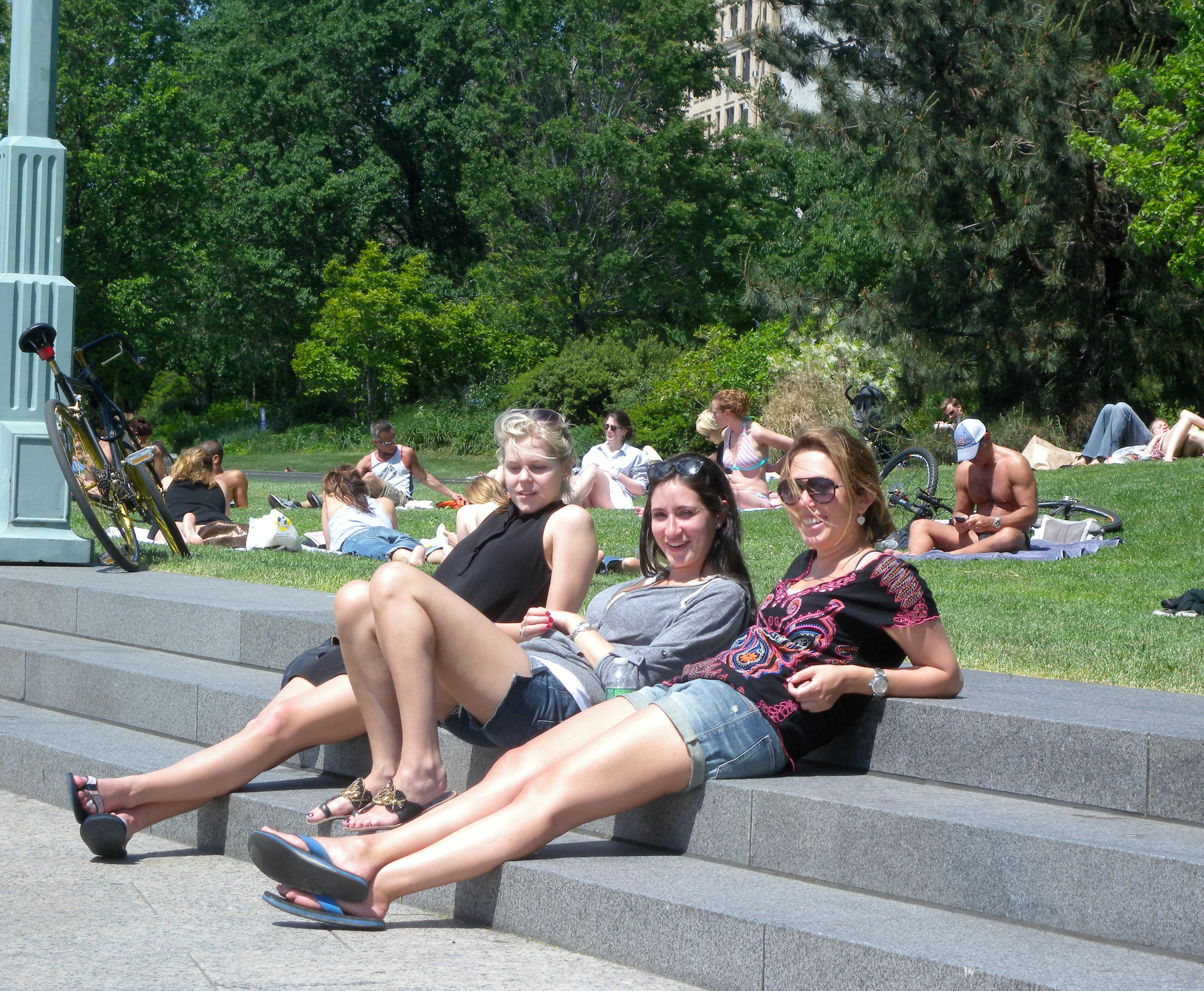
Three visitors sunning in the park

Recreational facilities of many kinds are located throughout Hudson River Park, catering to organized and individual sports, leisure activities, and activities for children. A defining physical feature of Hudson River Park is the five-mile (8.0 km) bike and running path that runs the park's length, connecting northward to Riverside South north of 59th Street and southward to Battery Park. Constructed by the State Department of Transportation, it is "the busiest bikeway in America" according to the Park Trust.

Scattered throughout the park are numerous fields and courts, such as Chelsea Waterside Park bounded by 24th Street, 11th Avenue, and 12th Avenue. The park contains a sports field, a basketball court, a playground with water features during the summer months, and a dog run named "Best of New York" by New York Magazine in May 2005. Pier 84 at West 44th Street is also packed with activities. Free fishing with Big City Fishing is available on the pier as well as free rowing and boat building at the Village Community Boathouse on the south side of Pier 40. Other maritime related activities include outrigger rowing and kayaking at Pier 26. The New York Water Taxi stops at Pier 42 near Christopher Street. Also on the pier is the casual restaurant PD O'Hurleys. Other sporting facilities include basketball courts at Canal Street and at Harrison Street, tennis courts south of Pier 40 between Houston and Canal Streets, pickleball courts near Pier 76, beach volleyball, and a California-style skate park at West 30th Street.

The largest sporting complex in Hudson River Park is the Chelsea Piers Sports and Entertainment Complex, which holds a variety of athletic spaces. Chelsea Piers sports a batting cage, bowling lanes, playing fields, a driving range, an ice skating rink, rock climbing facilities, and gymnastics space, among other exercise and fitness related spaces. Along with these indoor recreational facilities, Chelsea Piers offers boating activities and several restaurants on premises.

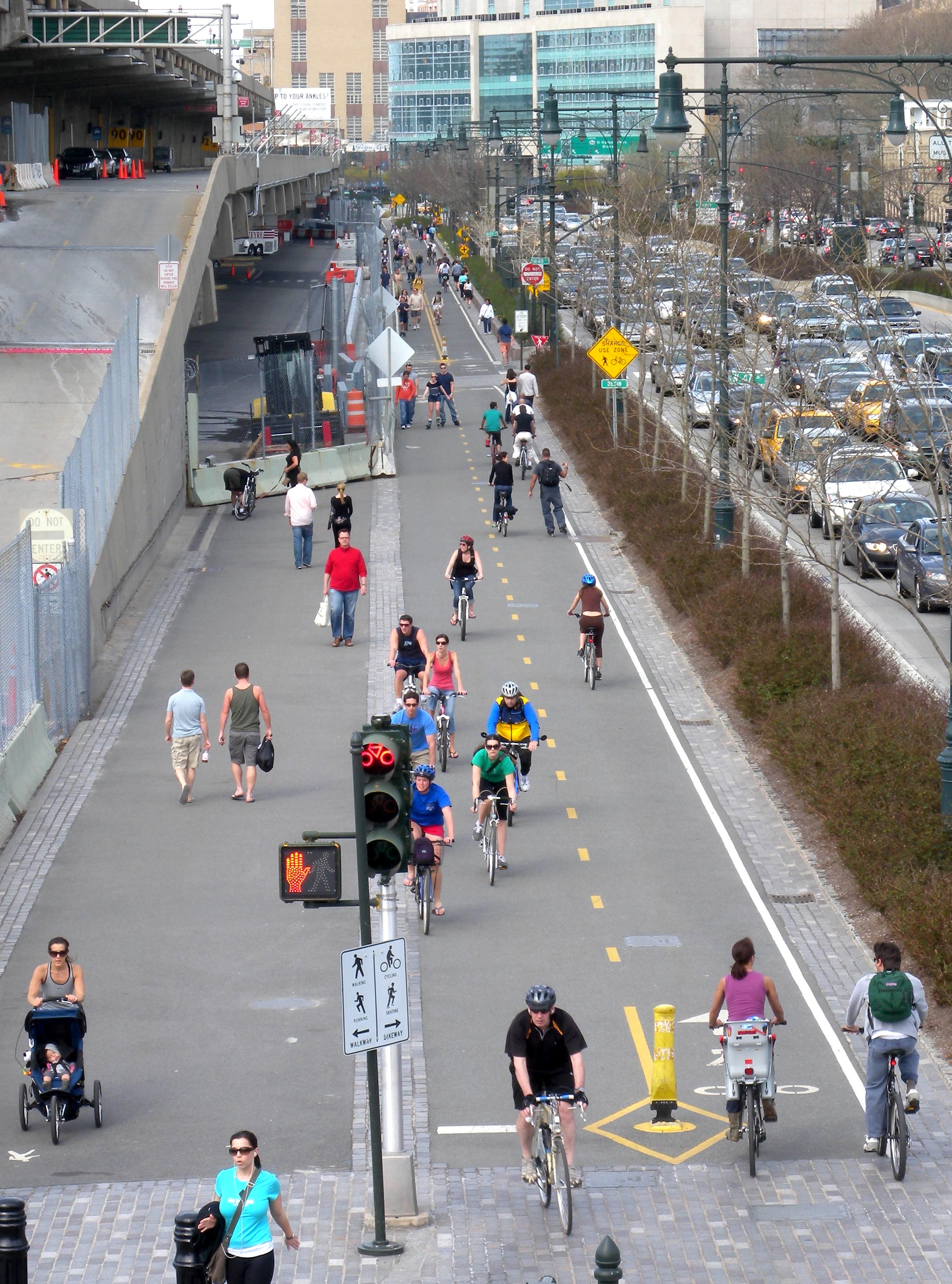
Hudson River Park at 46th Street

Hudson River Park offers opportunities for outrigger canoeing on Pier 66 at West 26th Street, rowing and sailing on Piers 40 and 66, and free kayaking on Piers 96, 84, and 40. The free kayaking attraction, run by New York City-based nonprofit organizations and volunteers, allows visitors to kayak along the Hudson River. The kayaking attraction, which is open five days a week including Saturdays and Sundays, serves as an affordable activity for tourists and resident New Yorkers alike, provided that the kayakers sign waivers and wear life vests.

Abundant open grassy areas in the park permit non-athletic leisure activity. Suntanning is a popular pastime in many areas. Clinton Cove (55th Street), Pier 84 (44th Street), the 14th Street Park, and Pier 45 are all wide unobstructed green spaces for sunbathing, and are popular locations.

=== Structures ===
Points of interest along the park's route include:

- Battery Park at its south end
- Battery Park City
- Brookfield Place and Winter Garden
- Chelsea Piers
- Day's End
- Intrepid Sea-Air-Space Museum
- Little Island
- Riverside Park at its north end
- The World Trade Center and surroundings

=== Notable piers ===
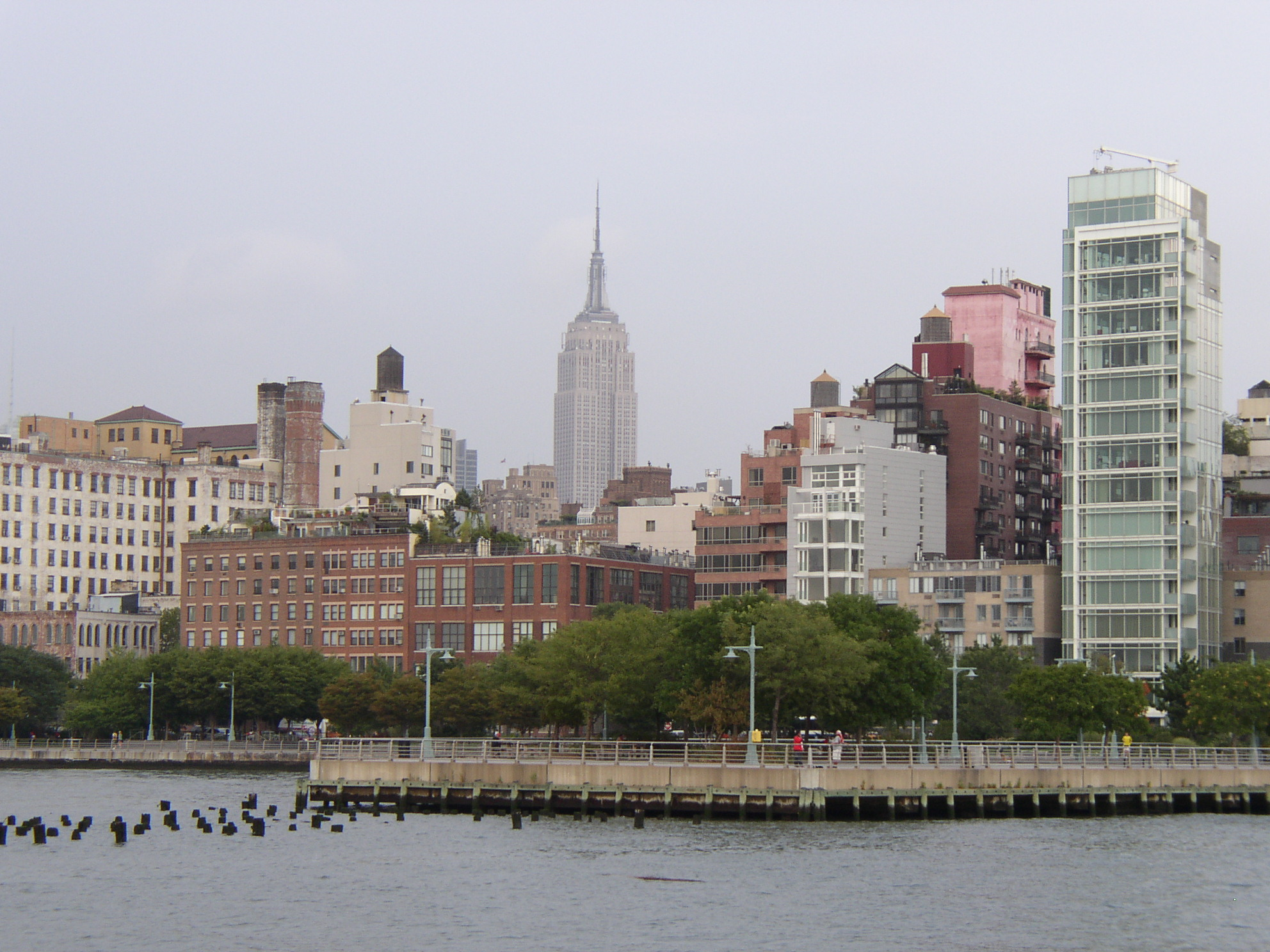
Hudson River Park with Empire State Building in the background

Pier 25 is a sports and docking facility at the foot of North Moore Street and part of Hudson River Park featuring the Mauro Memorial mini golf course. The museum ship USCGC Lilac, the last steam-powered vessel in the Coast Guard fleet, is moored there.

Pier 26 was rebuilt from 2008 to 2009. A new park, designed by OLIN and Rafael Viñoly, opened in October 2020.

Pier 34 is located at Canal Street and consists of two narrow walkways or "finger piers". At the end of the pier is a ventilation shaft for the Holland Tunnel, a five-story, 122-foot-tall (37 m) building with a trapezoidal footprint.

Pier 40, at Houston Street, is home to the New York Knights of the American National Rugby League, and the primary offices of the Hudson River Park Trust. Built as a terminal for the Holland America Line in 1962, it primarily serves youth and amateur sports with various playing fields, and also contains a commercial parking lot with long-term parking spaces. The Trapeze School of New York is also located here. According to the Hudson River Park Trust, the facility generates $6 million in operating revenue and 40% of the entire park's annual operating budget.

The term "Christopher Street Pier" usually refers specifically to Pier 45 opposite West 10th Street in Greenwich Village. However, it refers to three other piers as well, between Piers 42–51. Pier 51 houses a water-themed playground, part of Hudson River Park.

Gansevoort Peninsula is located in Hudson River Park between Gansevoort Street and Little West 12th Street, in the Meatpacking District, across from the Whitney Museum of American Art, between Gansevoort and Little West 12th streets, which affords it remarkable views of the Lower Manhattan skyline. In January 2019, it was announced that a 5.5-acre (2.2 ha) park would be designed on the site by James Corner Field Operations. The space now includes a public art project commissioned by the Whitney Museum, Day's End, a ghostly exoskeletal architectural outline of a pier by David Hammons, and a public beach. Gansevoort Peninsula opened on October 2, 2023, with a 1,200-short-ton (1,100-long-ton) beach, sports field, sunning lawn, promenades, two dog runs, a picnic area, fitness equipment, and a beachfront landing for non-motorized boats.

At the site of Pier 54 (shut down in 2011), plans arose in November 2014 for Little Island, a new park designed by Heatherwick Studio and costing between $130 million and $160 million. The park, a partnership between Barry Diller and Diane von Fürstenberg's foundation, the city and state, and Hudson River Park Trust, would float completely above the water. Plans for the pier were scrapped in September 2017 due to cost overruns and lawsuits, as the budget had gone over $200 million by then. The project was revived in October 2017 as part of an agreement to finish the park.

Pier 57, at 15th Street and 11th Avenue, formerly served as a terminal for shipping and storage of cargo for the Grace Line. Between 1969 and 2003, Pier 57 housed the Hudson Pier Bus Depot for the New York City Transit Authority. Since then, it has been designated for commercial development. During the 2004 Republican National Convention protests, the New York City Police Department used Pier 57 as a makeshift jail to hold people arrested during protests related to the convention. The holding pens were dubbed "Guantanamo on the Hudson" by activists and in the media. Various lawsuits were filed against the city related to conditions at the site and allegedly illegal arrests, including those of bystanders. Plans created in 2009 call for an improved pier design for commercial use, dubbed the SuperPier, which was slated to be completed in 2019.

Piers 59–62 are used as Chelsea Piers, which were originally a passenger ship terminal in the early 1900s that was used by the RMS Lusitania and was the destination of the RMS Titanic. The Chelsea Piers Sports & Entertainment Complex opened at the site in 1995.

Pier 63 was originally located near 23rd Street, adjacent to Chelsea Piers and Hudson River Park. The site was formerly the location of a Pavonia Ferry terminal that opened in 1869. The ferries traveled to Jersey City, located opposite Manhattan. By the beginning of the 20th century ferries were already aging and deteriorating under heavy use, and in 1942 the terminal itself was demolished. The pier then housed a Baltimore and Ohio Railroad transfer barge. In the late 1980s, boat enthusiast John Krevey converted an old railroad barge on the Hudson River to Pier 63. A restaurant was opened on the pier. The lightship Frying Pan and the fire vessel John J. Harvey were also originally moored to Pier 63, with both listed on the National Register of Historic Places. In 2007, the barge was moved to Pier 66 on 26th Street.

Pier 66 is located at 26th Street and is used for sailing and paddle sports.

Pier 76 has four temporary pickleball courts, which opened in November 2023.

Pier 79 is the West Midtown Ferry Terminal used by NY Waterway, while Pier 83 is used by Circle Line Sightseeing Cruises. The two companies played a prominent role in the rescue of passengers from US Airways Flight 1549, which made an emergency water landing on the Hudson in January 2009. Pier 79 connects to an Art Deco style ventilation shaft for the Lincoln Tunnel.

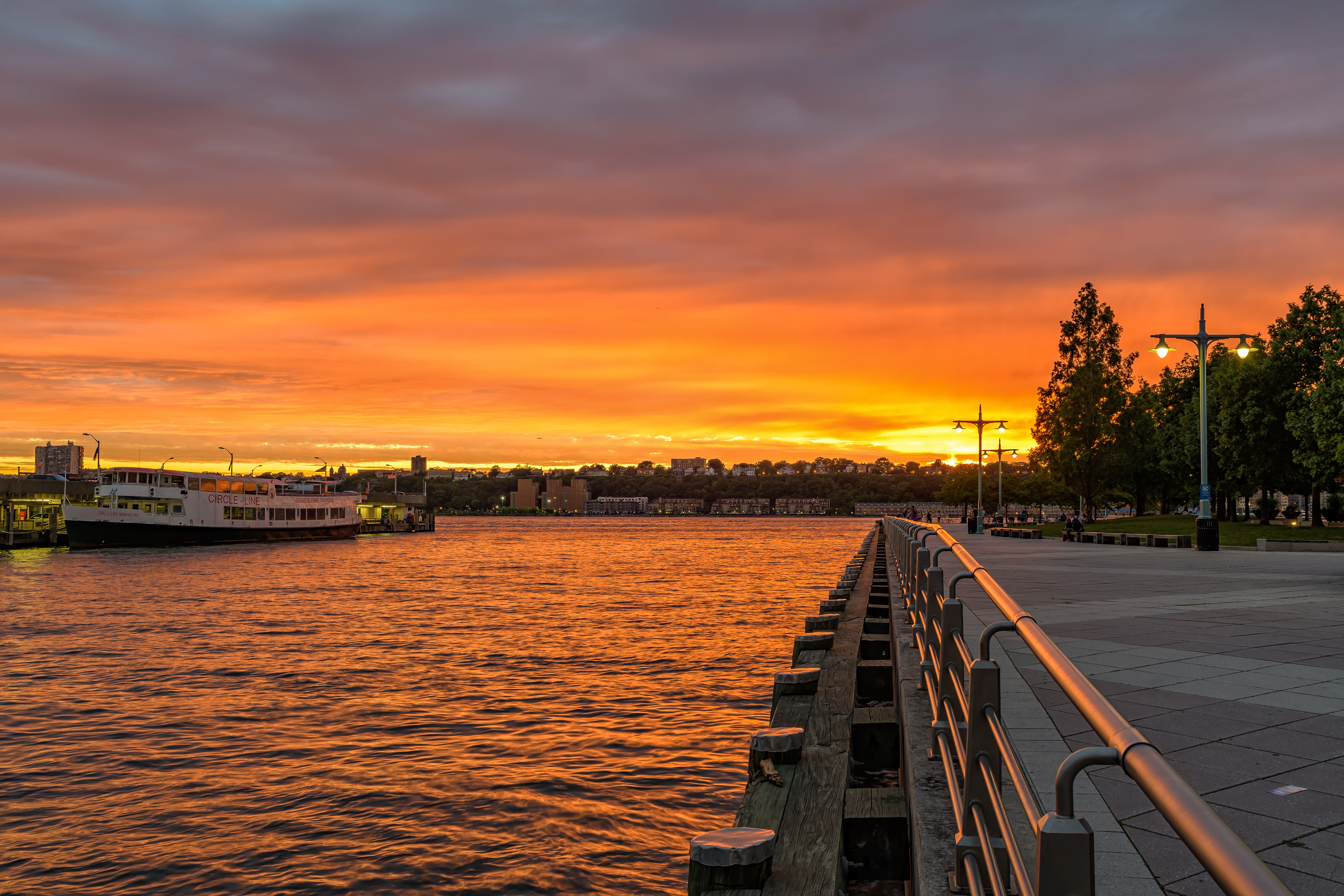
Pier 84

Pier 84 is on 12th Avenue and 44th Street. From 1981 until 1988, it served as a concert venue from the former Schaefer Music Festival. Headline acts such as The Clash, Frank Zappa, King Crimson, and Hot Tuna performed on the pier. Opened under Hudson River Park in 2006, it is the largest public pier in the park. The pier also houses a water-themed playground, part of Hudson River Park. In addition, Pier 84 is a stop for New York Water Taxi and has a bicycle rental shop and other businesses serving primarily tourists.

Pier 86 at West 46th Street is home to the Intrepid Sea, Air & Space Museum, the centerpiece of which is the USS Intrepid, an aircraft carrier that served from World War II to the Vietnam War. This pier once served as the passenger ship terminal for the United States Lines.

Piers 88–92 are part of the New York Passenger Ship Terminal, used by numerous modern cruise ships and ocean liners. In 1942, the USS Lafayette (formerly SS Normandie) caught fire at Pier 88, remaining capsized there for a year. Pier 94 was formerly also part of the Passenger Ship Terminal before becoming an exhibition hall called the UnConvention Center around 1988. In 2023, Vornado Realty Trust, Blackstone Inc., and Hudson Pacific Properties announced plans to build the 266,000-square-foot (24,700 m^{2}) Sunset Pier 94 Studios soundstage complex on the site, with six soundstages; the complex is planned to be completed by 2025 at a cost of $350 million.

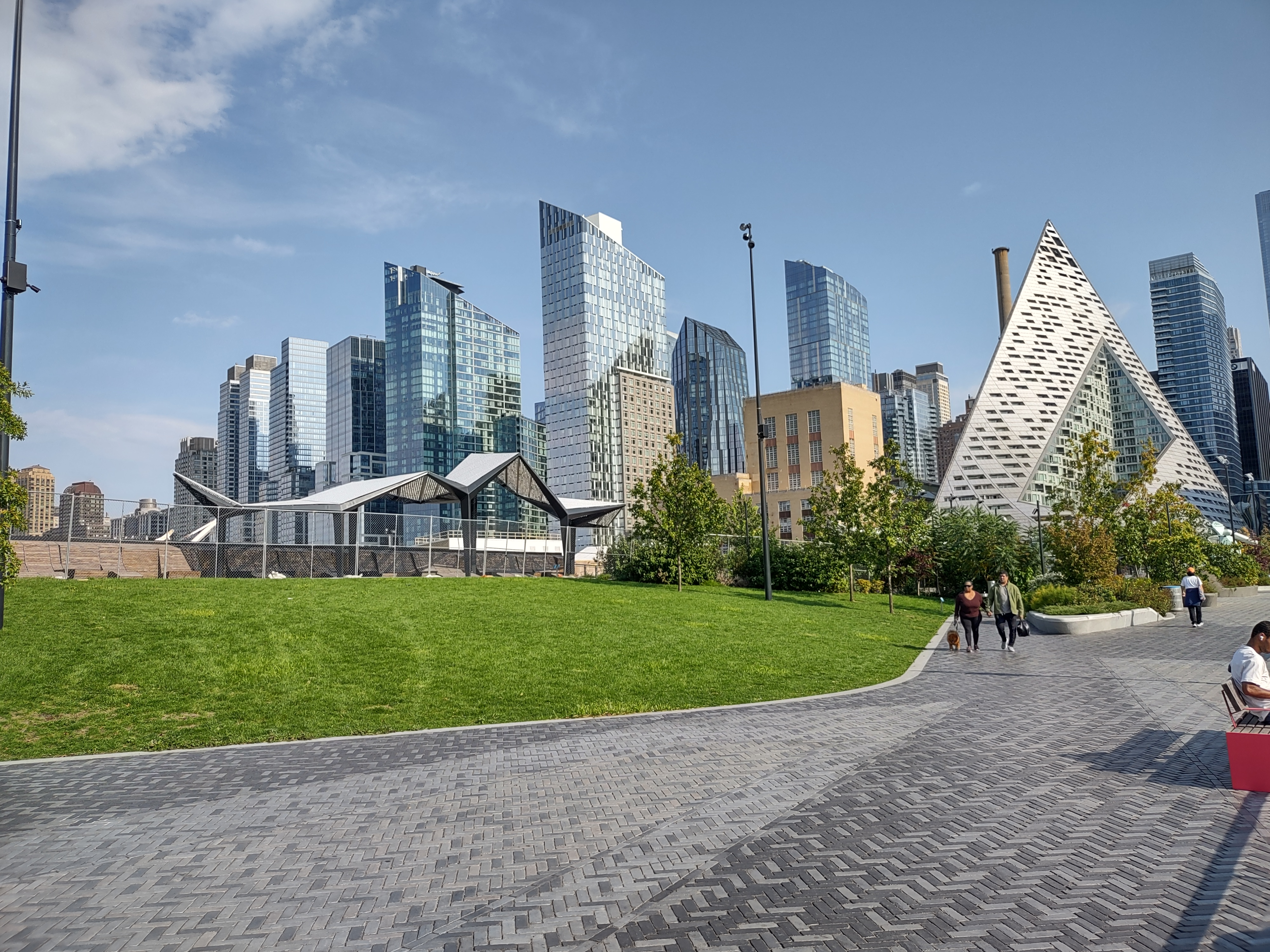
Pier 97 in October 2024

Pier 97 was until 1975 the home of the Swedish American Line passenger ship terminal. The terminal was demolished some time after 1984 and the pier became to a live event venue, JBL. In 2019, a public park was announced on Pier 97 as part of a $38 million renovation; the park was designed by !melk Architects. Parts of the park first opened in early 2024, and the pier was completed in October 2024.

== Incidents ==
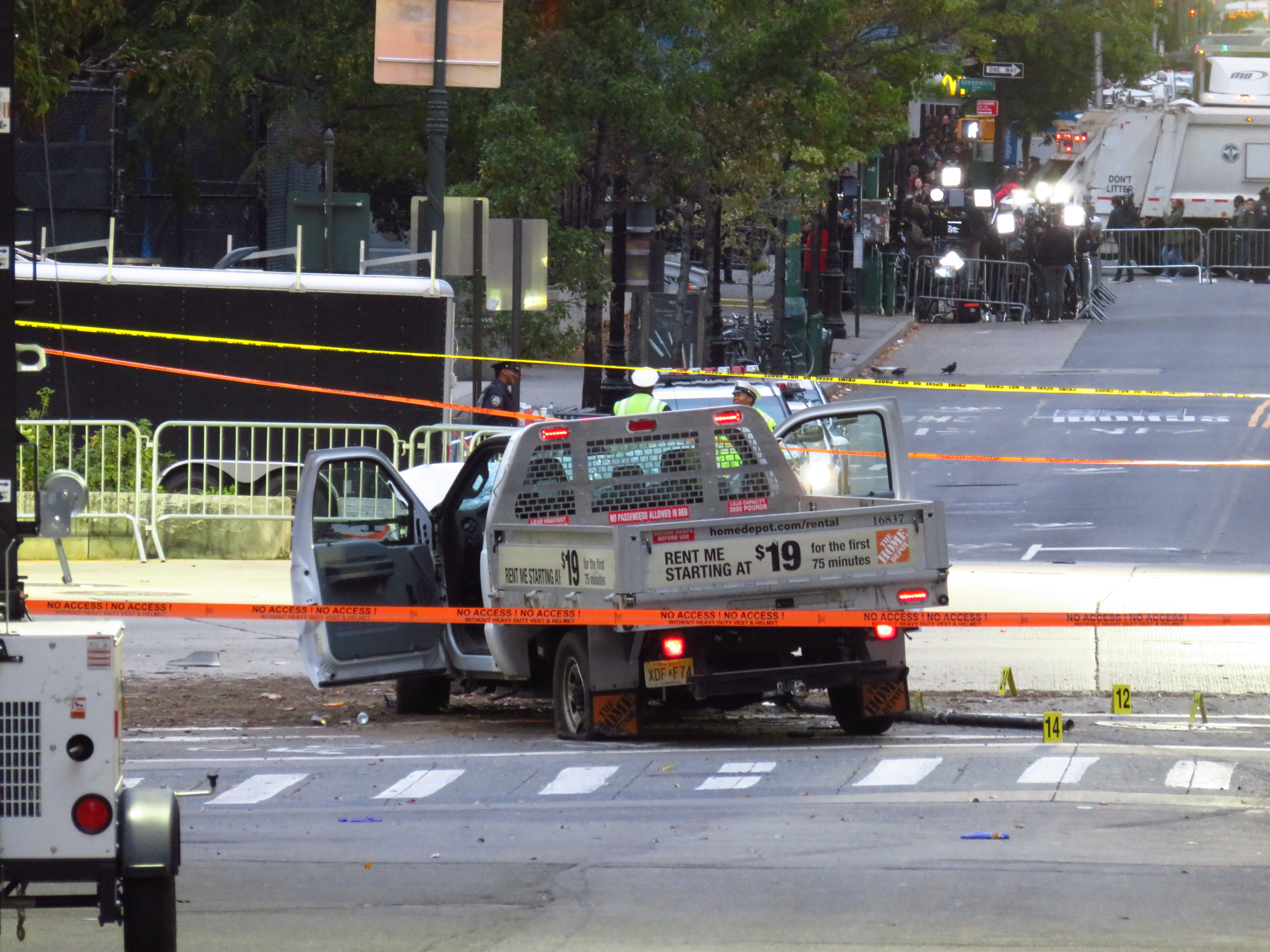
2017 terror attack in Hudson River Park

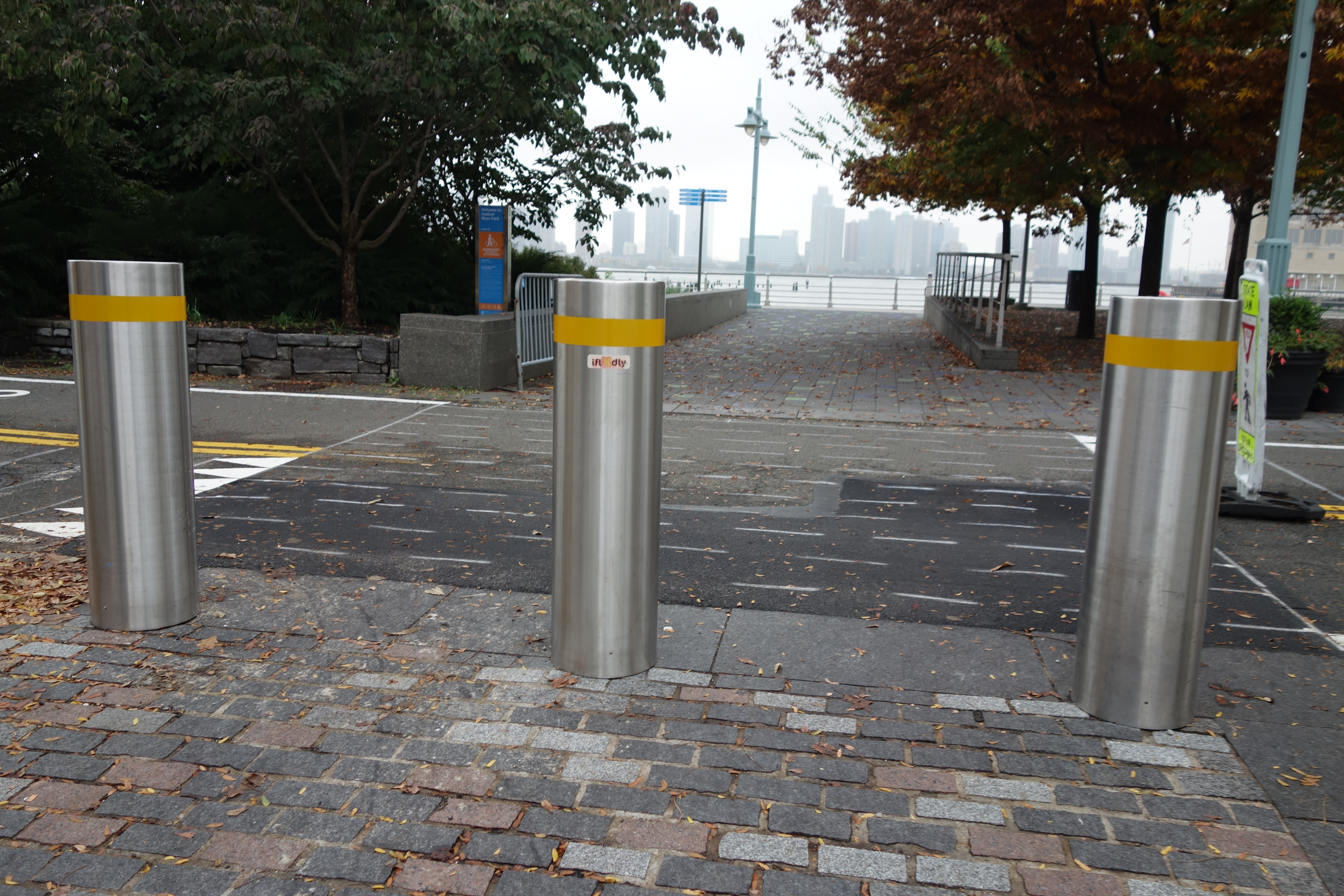
Permanent safety bollards protect Hudson River Park's bike path following a series of deadly incidents.

On June 23, 2006, a New York City Police Department truck turned onto the bike lane, hitting a cyclist, who later died due to injuries. On December 3, 2006, in the second fatal incident on the bike lane that year, a drunken driver drove on the bike lane south from Chelsea Piers before fatally hitting a cyclist near Clarkson Street, more than a mile away. At the time, it was noted that there were no protective barriers on the path, only three-inch-thick flexible bollards. The bike path was also criticized for generally bad design after several other deadly incidents, including a drunk-driving fatality at Chambers Street. After these deaths, Transportation Alternatives pushed for stronger bollards for several years, but the only fixes made to the path were clearer road markings.

On October 31, 2017, 29-year-old Uzbek immigrant Sayfullo Habibullaevich Saipov intentionally drove a pickup truck for a mile through the park's bike path between Houston Street and Chambers Street, killing eight people and injuring at least 11. Most of those who were hit were bike riders. The incident was considered the city's first deadly terrorist attack since the September 11 attacks. According to investigators, Saipov indicated allegiance to the Islamic State of Iraq and the Levant terror group. After the attack, several media sources wrote about how easy it was to drive down the bike lane, either by accident or on purpose, referencing the lack of bollards and the previous fatalities caused by drivers on the bike path. City and state officials also worked on ways to improve the bike lane's safety measures, and two days after the attack, the city started placing temporary concrete barriers on the path. Permanent safety bollards were installed starting in July 2018.

== See also ==
- Boulevard East
- New York Convention Center Operating Corporation
- Lower Manhattan Development Corporation
- Municipal Assistance Corporation for the City of NY
- North River Piers
- Roosevelt Island Operating Corporation
- United Nations Development Corporation
- West Side Highway
- Category:Parks on the Hudson River
