= New York Central Railroad 69th Street Transfer Bridge =

Historic dock in Manhattan, New York

Coordinates: 40.779209°N 73.989626°W

- U.S. National Register of Historic Places
- New York State Register of Historic Places
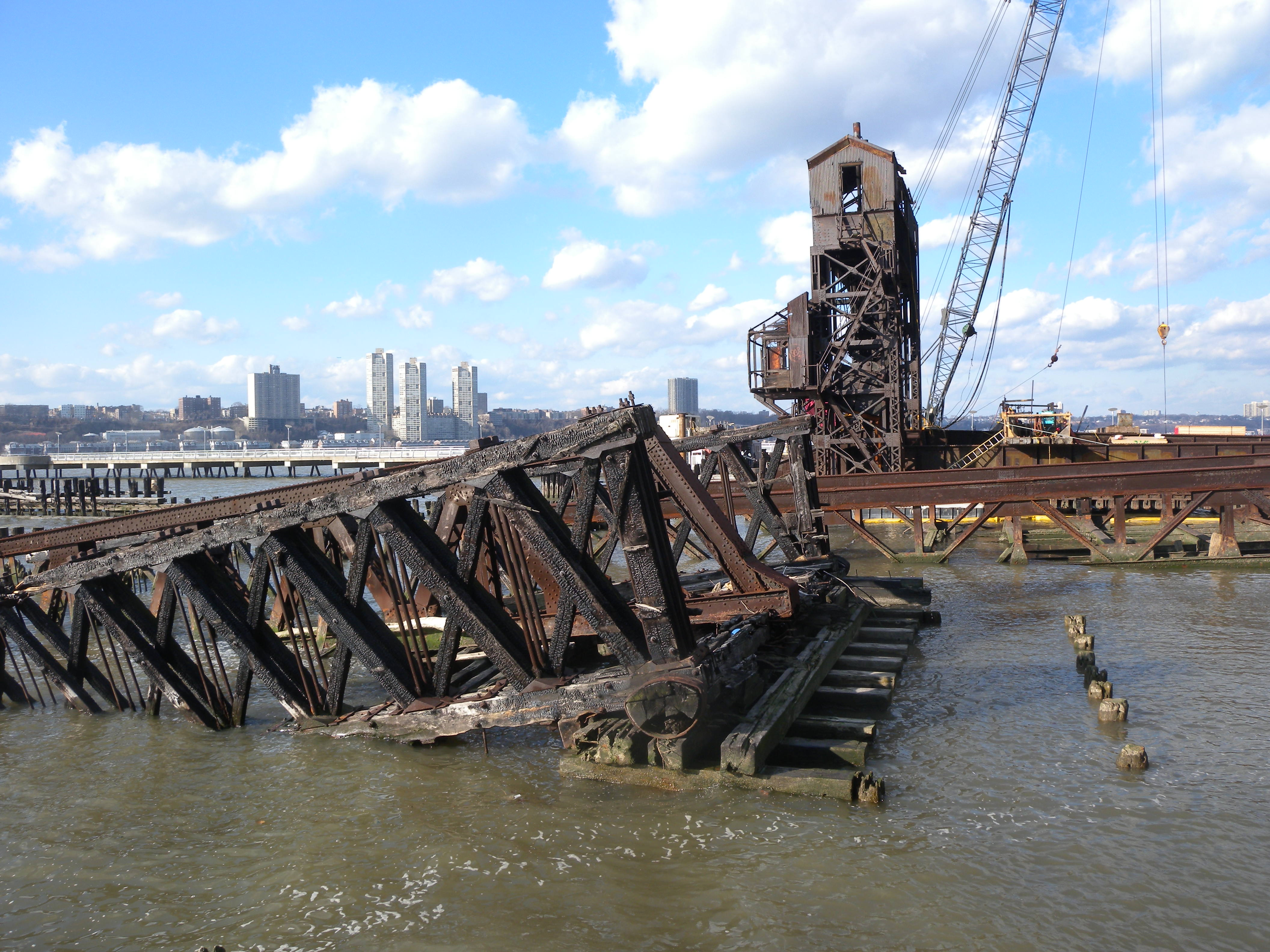
- 69th Street Transfer Bridge, February 2012
- Location: Hudson River West of the West Side Highway between West 66th and 70th Streets, Manhattan, New York, US
- Built: 1911
- NRHP reference No.: 03000577
- NYSRHP No.: 06101.007750

Significant dates
- Added to NRHP: June 26, 2003
- Designated NYSRHP: March 25, 2003

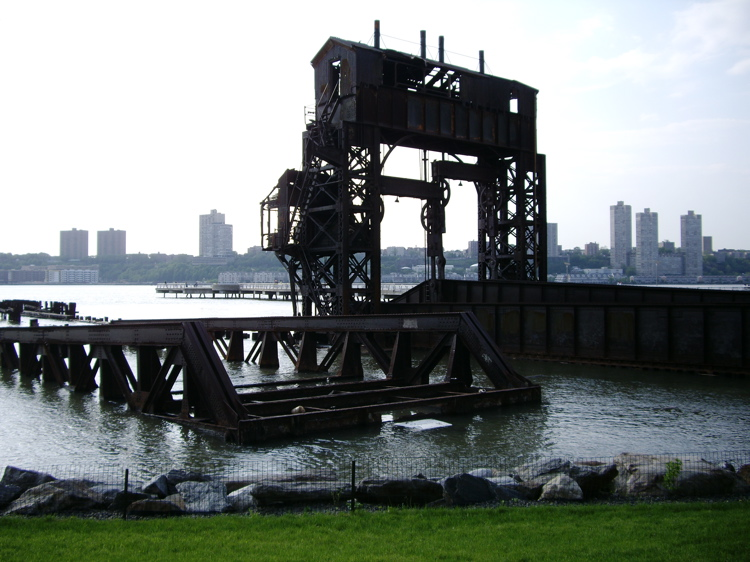
69th Street Transfer Bridge, May 2007

The 69th Street Transfer Bridge was a dock for car floats on the Upper West Side of Manhattan in New York City, United States. Part of the West Side Line of the New York Central Railroad, it allowed the transfer of railroad cars from the rail line to car floats which crossed the Hudson River to the Weehawken Yards in New Jersey. Its innovative linkspan design kept the boxcars from falling into the river while being loaded.

The transfer bridge was constructed in 1911 based on an innovative design by James B. French that allowed cargo to be rapidly loaded and unloaded.

After it fell into disuse, it was in danger of being torn down and removed, but around the year 2000, during renovations of Riverside Park, following the example of Gantry Plaza State Park, it became a prominent feature of the park. It was listed on the National Register of Historic Places in 2003.

Similar facilities are in use between 65th Street Yard in Brooklyn and Greenville Yard in Jersey City by the New York New Jersey Rail, LLC, which still operates car floats across Upper New York Bay.

As of October 2014, the New York City Department of Parks is in the design phase of a project to reconstruct, restore and adaptively reuse the 69th Street Transfer Bridge.

== See also ==
- 65th Street Yard – Rail yard in New York City
- Gantry crane – Type of overhead crane used in industrial environments
- Link span
- Moveable bridges
- National Register of Historic Places listings in Manhattan from 59th to 110th Streets
- New York Central Tugboat 13 – Railroad tugboat (1887–2017)
- Pier 63 – Pier in Manhattan, New York
