= John J. Harvey =

Retired New York City fireboat

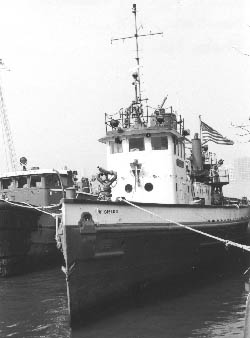
- Fireboat John J. Harvey

History

New York City Fire Department
- Name: John J. Harvey
- Namesake: John J. Harvey
- Port of registry: New York City, United States
- Ordered: 1928
- Builder: Todd Shipbuilding
- Cost: $594,000
- Laid down: 1930
- Launched: October 6, 1931
- Commissioned: December 17, 1931
- In service: December 17, 1931
- Out of service: 1995
- Renamed: Engine 57 (1931); Engine 86 (1938); Marine 2 (1959)(2001)
- Reclassified: Museum ship
- Refit: 1957
- Reinstated: Temporary return to service 9/11/2001
- Home port: North River Pier 66, New York City (As of 2019)
- Nickname(s): The "Harvey"
- Honors and awards: National Preservation Award
- Status: FDNY retired

General characteristics
- Type: Fireboat
- Displacement: 268 net tons
- Length: 130 ft (40 m)
- Beam: 28 ft (8.5 m)
- Draught: 9 ft (2.7 m)
- Installed power: 5 Fairbanks - Morse opposed piston Model 38F5¼ which consist of 8 cylinders with 16 pistons.
- Propulsion: Twin screws
- Speed: 18 knots
- Capacity: 18,000gpm
- Armament: Eight deck monitors and 24 large connections for fire hose
- John J. Harvey
- U.S. National Register of Historic Places
- New York State Register of Historic Places
- Location within New York City Location within New York Location within the United States
- Coordinates: 40°45′0″N 74°0′39″W
- Built: 1931
- Built by: Todd Shipyards
- Architect: Henry J. Gielow
- NRHP reference No.: 00000576
- NYSRHP No.: 06101.010679

Significant dates
- Added to NRHP: June 15, 2000
- Designated NYSRHP: April 5, 2000

John J. Harvey is a fireboat formerly of the New York City Fire Department (FDNY). She is one of the most powerful fireboats ever built, capable of pumping up to 18,000 gallons of water a minute. The boat famously returned to service following the September 11, 2001 attacks.

== New York Fire Department service ==
Launched in 1931, John J. Harvey served in the FDNY until she was brought out of service in 1994. She was named for marine fireman John J. Harvey, killed when a ship exploded during a fire. Among the marine fires at which she assisted were the Cunard Line pier fire in 1932, the burning of Normandie in 1942, the ammunition ship El Estero in 1943, and the collision of the oil tankers Alva Cape and Texaco Massachusetts in 1966. Her official designation at the end of her career was Marine 2.

It was also present for Andrea Doria's first arrival at New York.

John J. Harvey was sold at auction in 1999 to a private consortium of marine preservationists determined to prevent her from being scrapped. She was restored and began hosting frequent public free trips on the river. In June 2000 she was added to the National Park Service's National Register of Historic Places.

== September 11, 2001 ==
Shortly after the attacks on the World Trade Center on September 11, 2001, the boat's owners asked FDNY officials for permission to assist in maritime evacuations from Ground Zero. Meanwhile, firefighters had determined that the vast scale of destruction had damaged many fire mains, depriving fire crews of water. Officials radioed John J. Harvey, asking if her pumps still worked. Responding that they did, she was told to drop off her passengers as soon as possible and return to the disaster site, reactivating her official designation Marine 2. Alongside two other FDNY fireboats, John D. McKean and Fire Fighter, she pumped water at the site for 80 hours, until water mains were restored.

The National Trust for Historic Preservation gave John J. Harvey a special National Preservation Award to recognize this incident, and the ship's response became the subject of a 2002 children's book.

== Recent history ==
In 2018, she was repainted in a red and white dazzle pattern as part of an art project by Tauba Auerbach, in commemoration of the dazzle camouflage used on World War I ships.

As of 2025, the fireboat is moored at North River Pier 66, on the Hudson River at 12th Avenue and 26th Street, alongside the Lightship Frying Pan at the barge for Pier 66 Maritime in Hudson River Park.

== Gallery ==
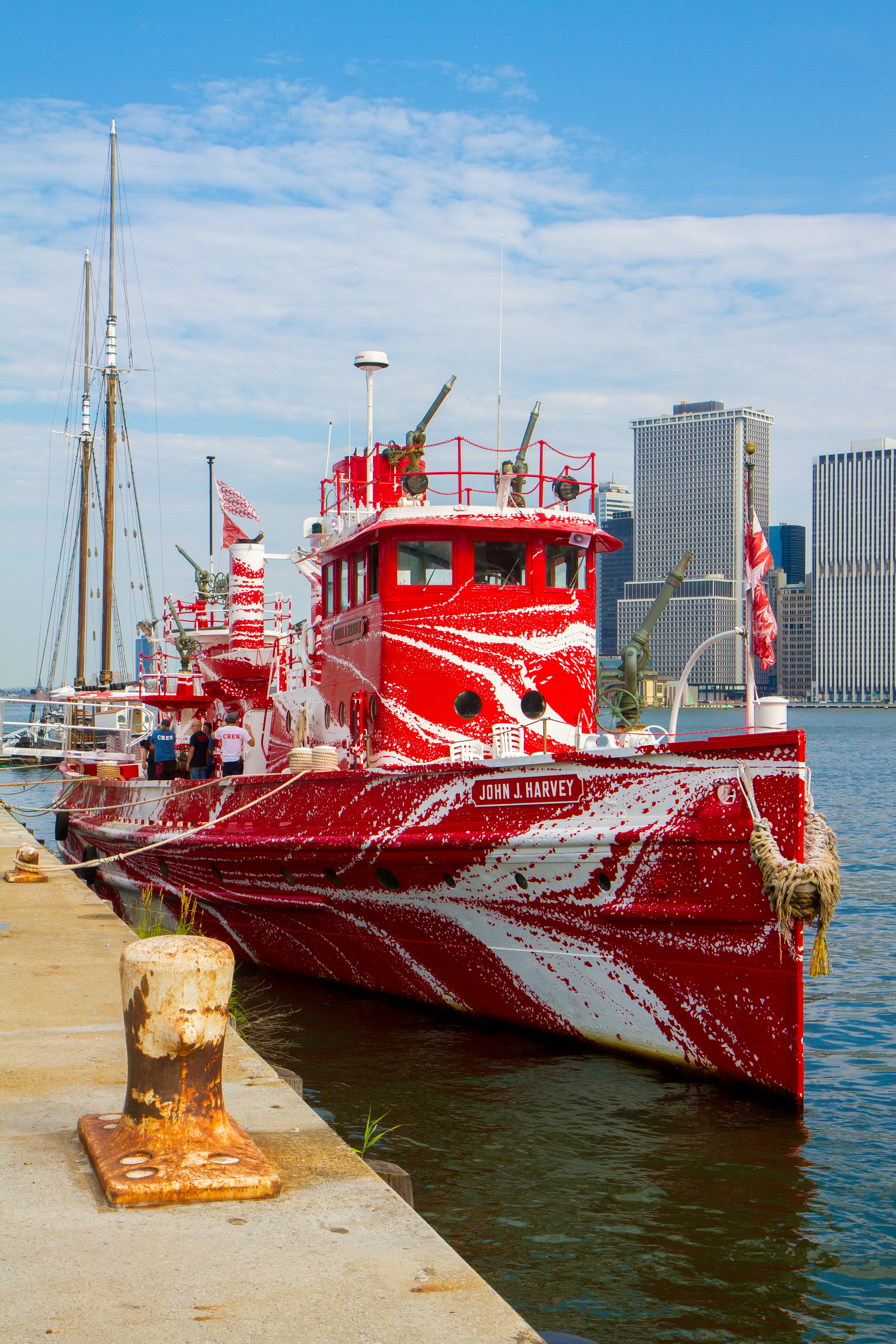
John J. Harvey painted in red and white as an art project

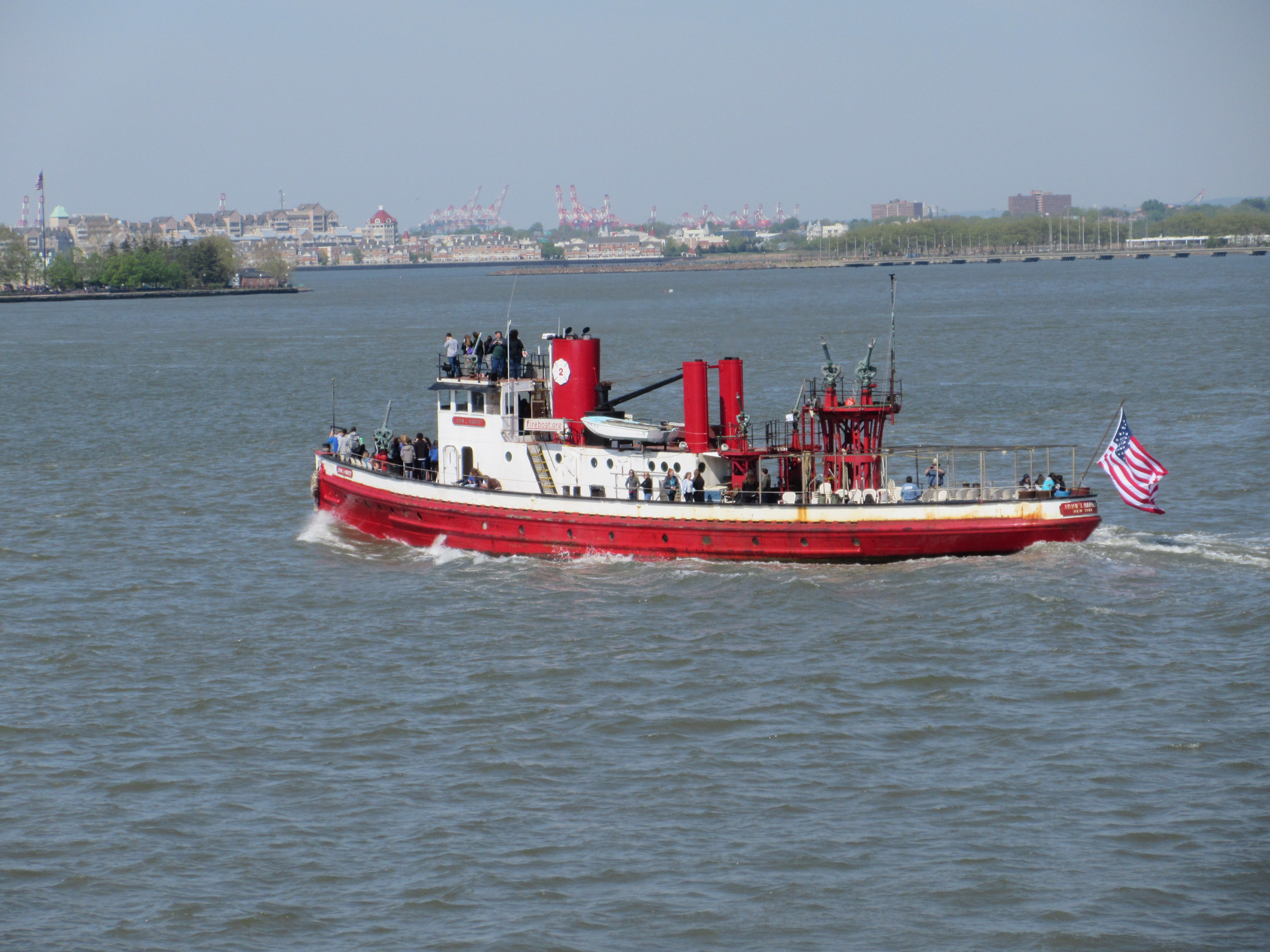
John J. Harvey underway near the Statue of Liberty
