= Pier 63 =

Pier in Manhattan, New York

Coordinates: 40°45′7″N 74°0′31″W

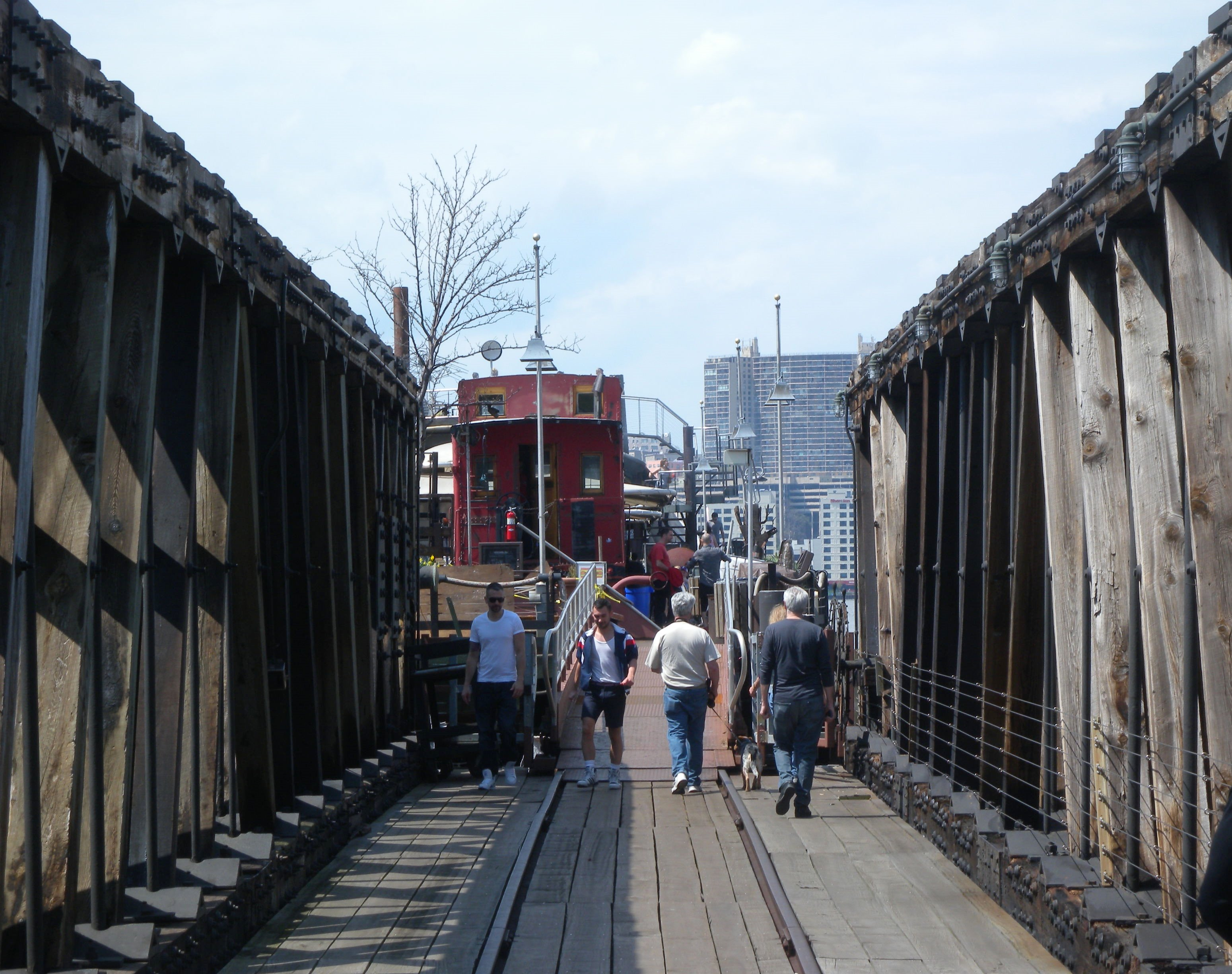
Caboose at Pier 66a

Pier 63 was the name for a former Delaware, Lackawanna and Western Railroad railroad barge on the Hudson River in Chelsea, Manhattan, New York City. It was originally located near 23rd Street, adjacent to Chelsea Piers and Hudson River Park. It had been purchased from a used car salesman in Staten Island by John Krevey in October 1996 and delivered by a tugboat. This barge formerly carried railroad boxcars across the Hudson River before the advent of containerized freight or tunnels beneath the river. The land side of Pier 63 was formerly used as a freight transfer station for the Baltimore and Ohio railroad where freight was moved from the boxcars on the barges to local conveyance.

In the spring of 2007 the barge was relocated from 23rd Street to Pier 66A at 26th Street, on the Hudson River, and was renamed Pier 66 Maritime. The barge currently has an Erie Lackawanna caboose on display.

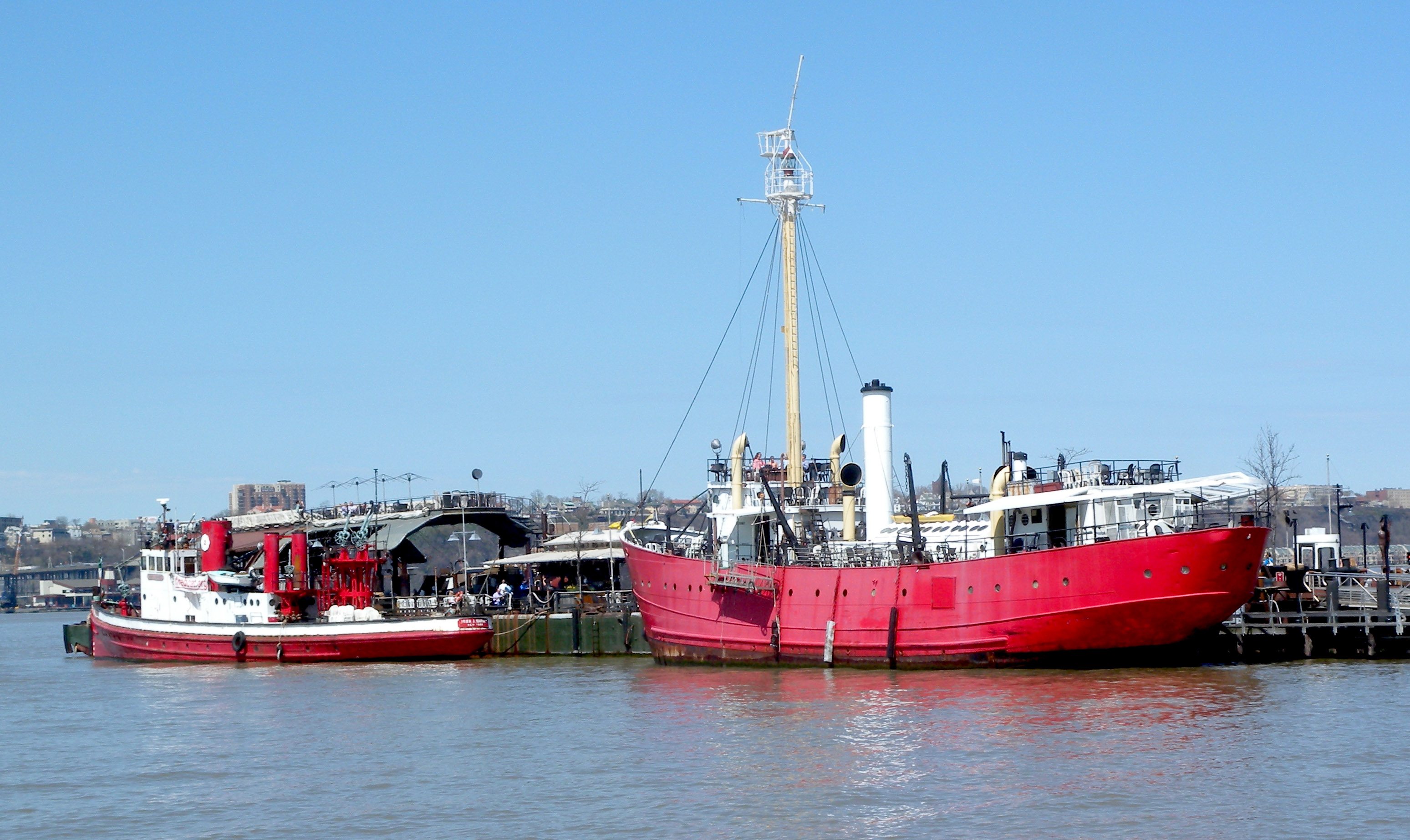
Boats at Pier 66a

Two historical boats were primarily located here: the lightvessel Frying Pan and the fireboat John J. Harvey.

On the same Pier 66A, there are storage facilities for kayaks, as well as a dock to launch. New York Water Taxi once had a stop on the Pier.

John Krevey, who ran Pier 66 Maritime, died on February 4, 2011. Krevey was one of the earliest members of Friends of Hudson River Park and a member of the Friends’ board of directors until 2010.
