= United States lightship Frying Pan (LV-115) =

American lightvessel used as restaurant

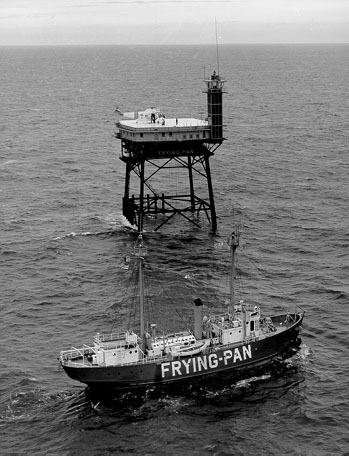
- Frying Pan on its last day at station (replaced by light tower)

History

United States
- Name: Frying Pan
- Builder: Charleston Dry Dock and Machine Co.
- Laid down: January 30, 1929
- Launched: August 30, 1929
- Acquired: April 8, 1930
- Status: Operational

General characteristics
- Displacement: 630 tons
- Length: 133 ft 3 in (40.61 m)
- Beam: 30 ft (9.1 m)
- Installed power: General Electric generators and motors.
- Crew: 15
- Frying Pan Shoals Lightship No. 115
- U.S. National Register of Historic Places
- New York State Register of Historic Places
- Location within New York City Location within New York Location within the United States
- Location: Pier 66a, formerly Pier 63, Chelsea, New York, New York
- Coordinates: 40°44′59.57″N 74°0′36.7″W
- Built: 1929
- Architects: Charleston Dry Dock and Machine Co.
- NRHP reference No.: 98001615

Significant dates
- Added to NRHP: January 28, 1999
- Designated NYSRHP: December 7, 1998

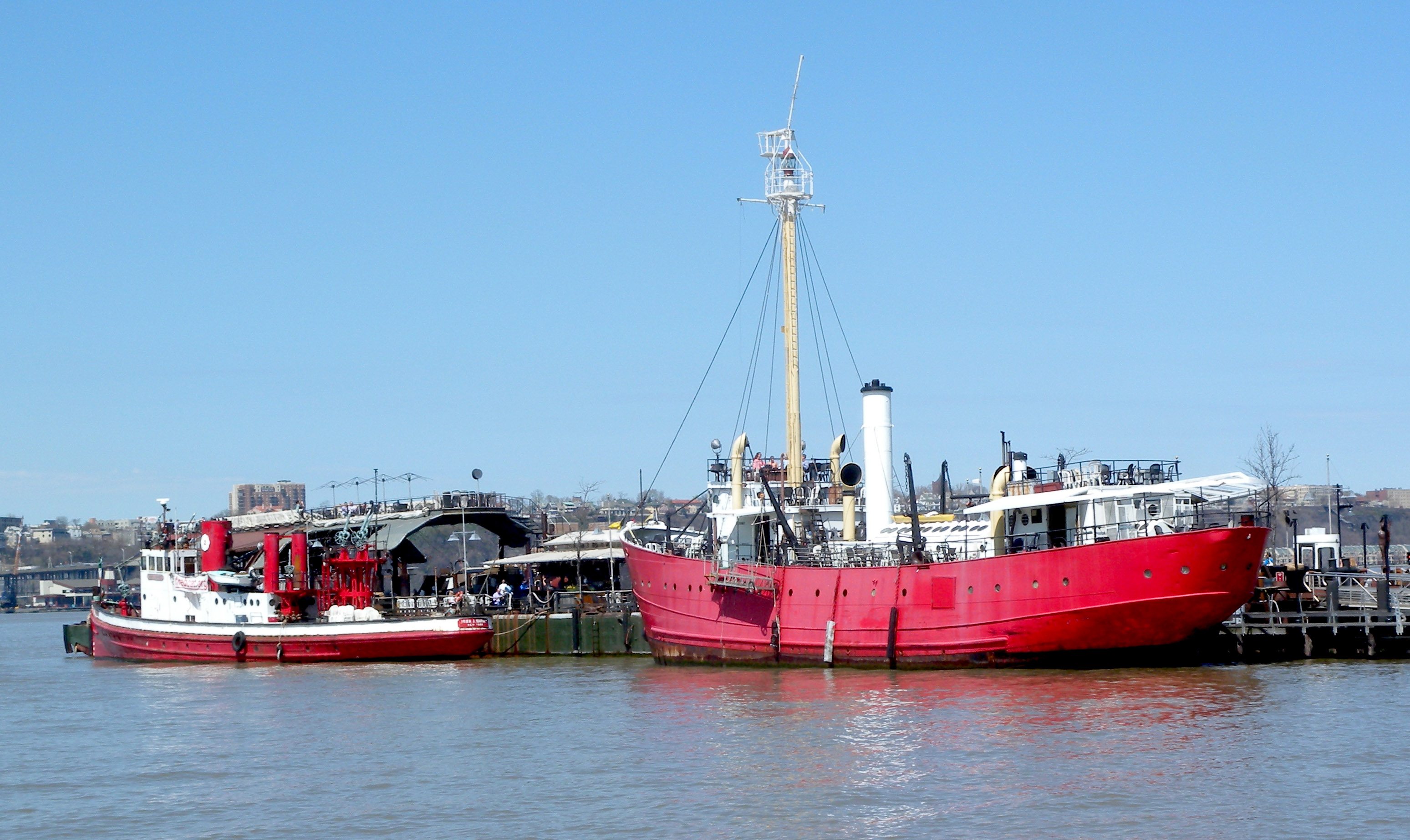
In New York

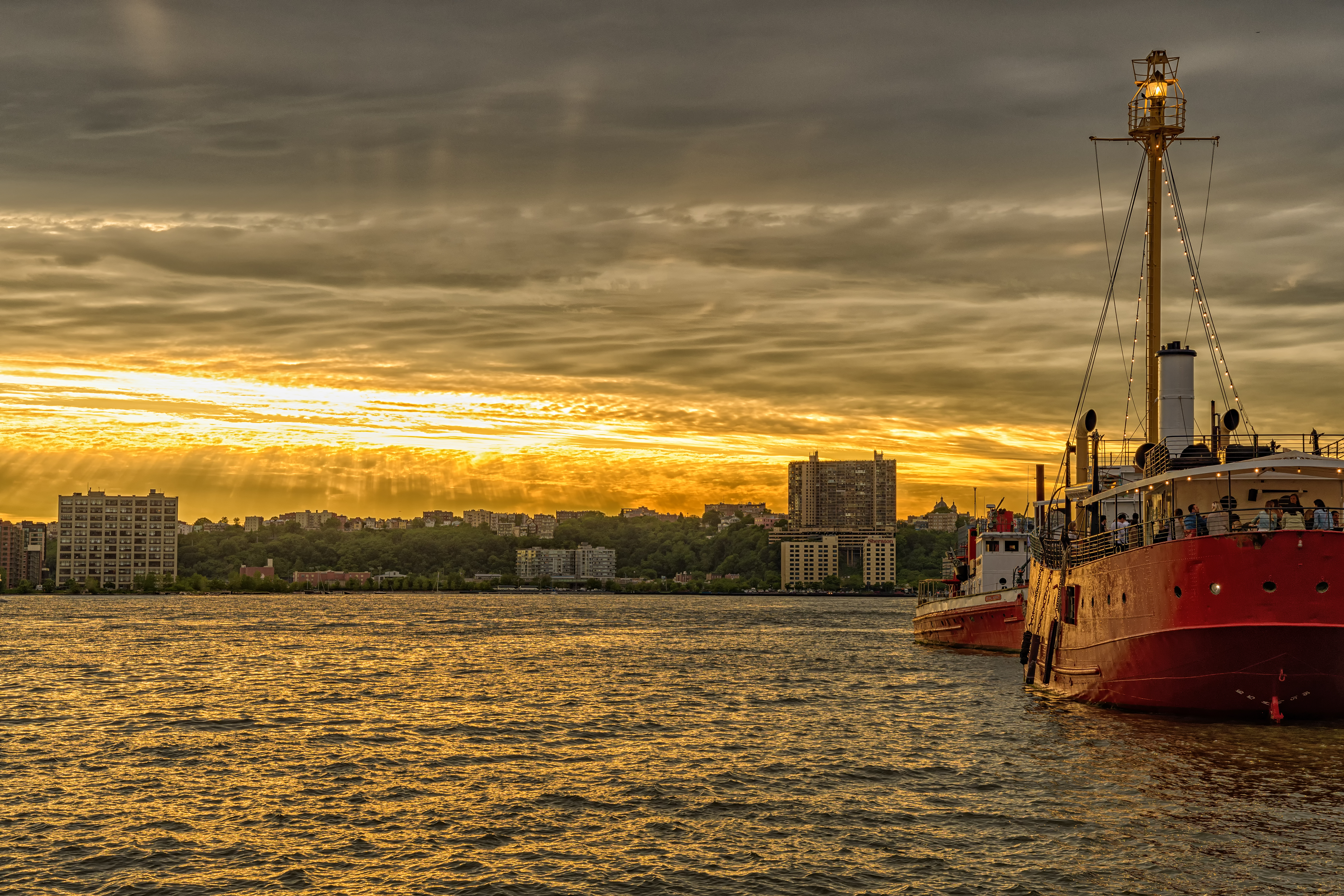
Frying Pan LV-115 (foreground) and John J. Harvey fireboat (background) in the Hudson River, Manhattan, New York, NY

Frying Pan (LV-115) is a lightvessel moored at Pier 66a in the Chelsea neighborhood of Manhattan in New York City. It served at Frying Pan Shoals, off Cape Fear in North Carolina, for over 30 years.

== Frying Pan Shoals station ==
In 1854, because of complaints from mariners that the height of the existing Bald Head Lighthouse was inadequate, and the light of its third-order Fresnel lens was not bright enough to warn mariners of the shallow waters of the treacherous Frying Pan Shoals off the coast of Cape Fear in North Carolina, United States, the first lightship was stationed on the shoals, in lieu of a proposal to improve Bald Point Lighthouse. The Bald Point lighthouse, and others, were turned off during the Civil War to avoid aiding the Northern ships. Lightships remained on station for 110 years.

On July 29, 1944, Lieutenant (jg) Clarence Samuels, USCG, became the first Hispanic-American of African descent to command a lightship when he assumed command of Frying Pan.

The ship was replaced by a lighttower in 1964. The lighttower, a Texas tower, was manned until 1979, is known as a diving spot and still stands.

Frying Pan was the last of nine ships that served in succession, with some alternation, at the Frying Pan Shoals station during and since the American Civil War.

== Construction and features ==
LV-115 was built in 1929–1930 by Charleston Drydock & Machine Co. for a contract price of $274,434. The keel was laid January 30, 1929 with launch on August 30 and delivery on April 8, 1930. In addition to the light, horn and manually operated bell the vessel was equipped with radio, radio-beacon and submarine signal bell when built.

== Service ==
Frying Pan served at Frying Pan Shoals from 1930 to 1942, and again from 1945 to 1964. During World War II the ship was used as an examination vessel, as part of training.

Frying Pan was retired from duty at Frying Pan Shoals in 1964. It served briefly as a relief ship at Cape May, New Jersey, and then was decommissioned in 1965. The ship sank in 1986. It was raised in 1987, then resold and eventually restoration began in 1988. It was listed on the National Register of Historic Places in 1999.

Frying Pan is one of about 13 surviving American lightships, out of about 100 built. Four other lightships, Ambrose at South Street Seaport, Nantucket at East Boston, Massachusetts, Chesapeake at Baltimore Inner Harbor and Swiftsure at Northwest Seaport became National Historic Landmarks and are open to the public as museum ships.

== Restaurant ==
She was purchased and sailed to New York City in 1989. Used as a public community space, she added to the National Register of Historic Places in 1991.

Frying Pan now serves as a cafe & restaurant in Hudson River Park, New York City.
