= Tauba Auerbach =

American artist (born 1981)

- Born: 1981 (age 44–45); San Francisco, California, U.S.
- Known for: Painting; Weaving; Sculpture; Typography; Publishing
- Website: taubaauerbach.com diagonalpress.com

Tauba Auerbach (born 1981) is a visual artist working in many disciplines including painting, artists' books, sculpture, and weaving who lives and works in New York.

== Early life and education ==
Auerbach grew up in San Francisco, California, the child of theater designers. They apprenticed and worked as sign painters at New Bohemia Signs in San Francisco from 2002–2005.

== Work ==
A life-long student of math and physics, Auerbach's work contends with structure and connectivity on the microscopic to the universal scale. “Engaging a variety of media, ranging from painting and photography to book design and musical performance, Auerbach explores the limits of our structures and systems of logic (linguistic, mathematical, spatial) and the points at which they break down and open up onto new visual and poetic possibilities".

== Notable work ==
=== Text and language-based work ===
In their first solo exhibition, Auerbach showed a series of text-based drawings that explored various linguistic systems including calligraphy, Morse code, semaphore signals, the Ugaritic alphabet and Alexander Melville Bell's visible speech.

=== Fold paintings ===
Auerbach gained acclaim for their Fold paintings, which they first exhibited in 2009. They were included in the 2010 Whitney Biennial, and Greater New York at Moma PS1.

=== Weave paintings ===
The all-white and sometimes bi-colored stretched weavings were first exhibited in Tetrachromat, and grew more intricate and architectural in the following years. They are composed of woven canvas strips.

=== Grain paintings ===
A series of gestural paintings created using custom tools made by the artist. "Some kind on controlled repetition. It is not irrational copying and pasting, but a way to see something slightly different for a reduced period of time. Scarcity then increases the value, directs our attention and creates characters" Luis Alberto Mejia Clavijo.

=== Glass sculpture ===
In 2015 Auerbach was a resident at Urban Glass in Brooklyn, NY. Here they learned the skills to craft the glass sculptures in the exhibition Projective Instrument.

=== Auerglass ===
The Auerglass Organ is a two-person tracker action pump organ conceived by Tauba Auerbach and Cameron Mesirow (Glasser) and constructed by Parson's Pipe Organs in Canandaigua, NY. Each player has a keyboard with alternating notes of a four octave scale. The instrument cannot be played alone because each player must pump to supply wind to the other player’s notes. Auerbach and Mesirow composed and performed a piece of music on the Auerglass in 2009. The instrument is now in residence at Future-Past studio in Hudson, New York.

=== Extended object paintings ===
This is a series of small paintings made using an apparatus which allows the coordinated deposit of paint on the canvas in deliberate arrays of droplets.

== Exhibitions ==
=== Solo exhibitions ===
- 2005: How to Spell the Alphabet, New Image Art Gallery, Los Angeles, California
- 2006: Yes and Not Yes, Deitch Projects, New York
- 2007: The Answer/Wasn't Here, Jack Hanley Gallery, San Francisco, California
- 2009: Here and Now/And Nowhere, Deitch Projects, New York
- 2010: The W Axis, Standard (Oslo), Oslo, Norway
- 2011: Tetrachromat, Bergen Kunsthall, Bergen, Norway; Malmo Konsthall, Malmo, Sweden; Wiels Contemporary Art Center, Brussels, Belgium
- 2013: Night (1947-2015), The Phillip Johnson Glass House, New Canaan, Connecticut
- 2013: A comb, A grating, A wave, A particle, A solid, A field, A mirror, A sundial, A slice, A charge, A hole, A ghost, Standard (Oslo), Oslo, Norway
- 2014: The New Ambidextrous Universe, Institute of Contemporary Arts, London
- 2015: (Two person) Reciprocal Score / Tauba Auerbach and Charlotte Posenenske, Indipendenza Roma, Rome, Italy
- 2016: Projective Instrument, Paula Cooper Gallery, New York
- 2016/2017: Safety Curtain, Vienna State Opera, an exhibition project by museum in progress, Vienna, Austria
- 2018: INDUCTION: Tauba Auerbach and Eliane Radigue, MOCA Cleveland, Cleveland, OH
- 2018-2019 Flow Separation: John J. Harvey Fireboat, commissioned by Public Art Fund and 14-18 NOW, New York Harbor, New York
- 2018: A Broken Stream, Paula Cooper Gallery, New York
- 2019: Current, Artist’s Institute, New York, NY
- 2020: Panthalassa, Standard (Oslo), Oslo, Norway

=== Group exhibitions ===
- 2009: The Generational: Younger than Jesus, The New Museum, New York
- 2010: 2010 Whitney Biennial, Whitney Museum of American Art, New York
- 2010: Greater New York, MoMA PS1, Long Island City, New York
- 2011: The Indiscipline of Painting Tate St. Ives, Cornwall, touring to Warwick Art Centre (2011/12)
- 2012: Lifelike, Walker Art Center, Minneapolis, Minnesota
- 2012: Remote Control, Institute of Contemporary Arts, London
- 2012: Ecstatic Alphabets/Heaps of Language, MoMA, New York
- 2013: DECORUM: Carpets and tapestries by artists, Musee D'Art Moderne, Paris
- 2015: TeleGenic - Art and Television, Kunstmuseum Bonn, Bonn, Germany
- 2015: Condensed Matter Community, Synchrotron Radiation Center: Home of Aladdin, Stoughton, Wisconsin
- 2016: Typeface to Interface: Graphic Design from the Collection, SFMoMA, San Francisco, California

== Books ==
=== Diagonal Press ===
In 2013 Auerbach founded Diagonal Press, under which they publish books, type specimens, manipulatives and other items. All publications are open editions; nothing is signed or numbered.

- A Partial Taxonomy of Periodic Linear Ornament. Tauba Auerbach. New York: Diagonal Press (2017).
- There Have Been and Will Be Many San Franciscos. Tauba Auerbach. New York: Diagonal Press (2016).
- Projective Ornament. Claude Bragdon. New York: Diagonal Press (2016).
- A Primer of Higher Space. Claude Bragdon. New York: Diagonal Press (2016).
- The Gold Church. Tauba Auerbach. New York: Diagonal Press (2014).
- Reciprocal Score. Tauba Auerbach. New York: Diagonal Press (2015).
- Z Helix. Tauba Auerbach. New York: Diagonal Press (2015).
- Maille. Tauba Auerbach. New York: Diagonal Press (2014).
- Saccade 1. Tauba Auerbach. New York: Diagonal Press (2013).
- Saccade 2. Tauba Auerbach. New York: Diagonal Press (2013).
- Saccade 3. Tauba Auerbach. New York: Diagonal Press (2013).

=== Artists' books: editions ===
- [2,3]. New York: Printed Matter, 2010. Edition of 1,000., 85 Artist's Proofs, 3 Printer's Proofs, 12 Hors Commerce.
- STAB/GHOST. Paris: Three Star Books, 2013. Edition of 10, 3 Artist's Proofs, 3 Hors Commerce.
- RGB Colorspace Atlas, New York: 2011. Three volumes. Edition of 3, 2 Artist's Proofs, 2 Exhibition Copies, 1 Binder's Copy.
- Bent Onyx, New York: 2012. Edition of 3, 2 Artist's Proofs.
- Marble, New York: 2011. Edition of 10, 2 Artist's Proofs, 2 Exhibition Copies.
- Wood, New York: 2011. Edition of 10, 2 Artist's Proofs, 2 Exhibition Copies.
- Float, New York: 2011. Edition of 8, 2 Artist's Proofs, 2 Exhibition Copies.

=== Monographs ===
- How To Spell the Alphabet. New York: Deitch Projects (2007). ISBN 9780977868605
- 50/50: Tauba Auerbach. New York: Deitch Projects (2008). ISBN 9780981577111
- Chaos: Tauba Auerbach. New York: Deitch Projects (2009). ISBN 9780981577173
- Folds: Tauba Auerbach. Berlin: Sternberg Press (2012). ISBN 9781934105641
- S v Z: Tauba Auerbach. SFMoMA/D.A.P. 2020
