= North River Pier 66 =

Pier in Manhattan, New York

Coordinates: 40°45′09″N 74°00′33″W

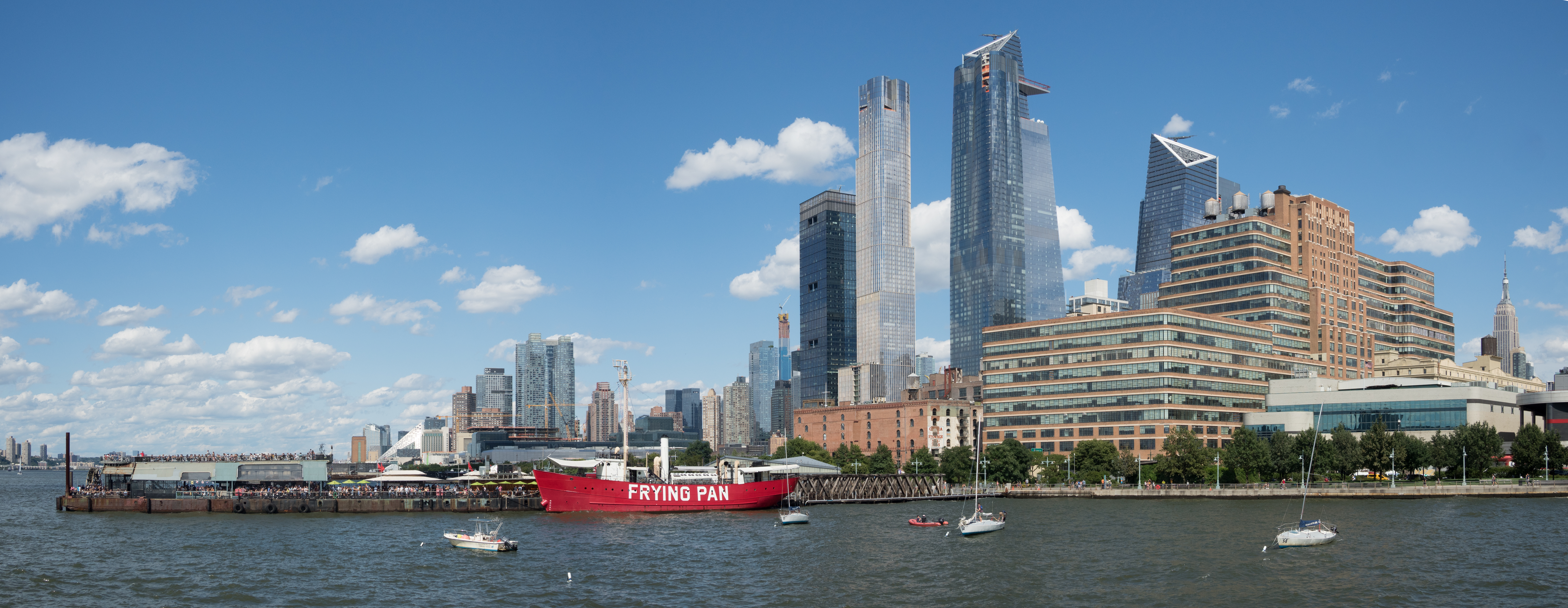
Pier 66, with Hudson Yards in the background

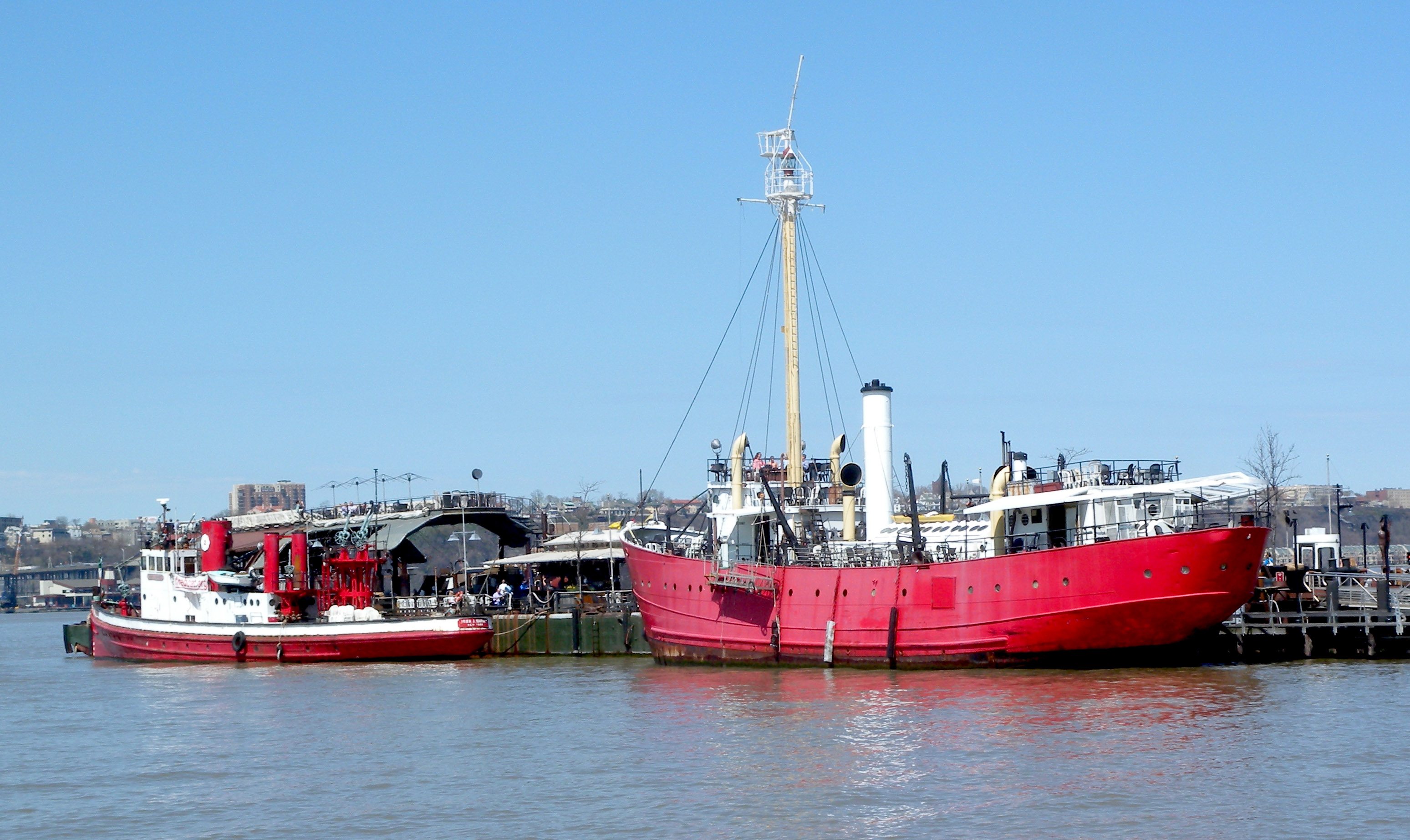
Docked at Pier 66

North River Pier 66 is a public boat house in Manhattan, New York, United States, located at 12th Avenue and 26th Street on the Hudson River.

New York River Sports, located at Pier 66, comprises Hudson River Community Sailing, NY Kayak Polo, and New York Outrigger, who all share the facility.

The fireboat John J. Harvey, which offers occasional public boat rides, and the lightship Frying Pan, which is open to the public, are moored at Pier 66.
