= Rodolfo Machado (architect) =

Argentine-American architect and educator

- Rodolfo Machado
- Born: 1942 (age 83–84); Buenos Aires, Argentina
- Education: University of Buenos Aires; University of California, Berkeley
- Occupation: Architect
- Practice: Machado Silvetti

Rodolfo Machado (born 1942) is an Argentine-American architect, urban designer, and educator. He co-founded Machado Silvetti, a Boston-based architecture and urban design firm, with Jorge Silvetti. Machado is Professor in Practice of Architecture and Urban Design, Emeritus at the Harvard Graduate School of Design.

== Early life and education ==
Machado was born in Buenos Aires, Argentina, in 1942. He received his Diploma in Architecture from the University of Buenos Aires in 1967. During the 1967–68 academic year, he studied urban design at the Centre de Recherche d'Urbanisme in Paris, France. In 1971, he received his Master of Architecture degree from the University of California, Berkeley, where he continued doctoral studies in architectural theory until 1973. Machado has resided in the United States since 1968 and is a United States citizen.

== Career ==
While studying architecture in Buenos Aires, Machado and Silvetti were members of Arquitectos Asociados, an experimental group formed in 1965 by architecture students and recent graduates of the University of Buenos Aires to collaborate on competitions, commissions, and architectural research.

After his graduate studies, Machado practiced architecture in San Francisco and Pittsburgh before beginning his professional association with Jorge Silvetti in 1974. Early work by Machado and Silvetti included experimental architectural and urban design projects; drawings from their 1970s work, including the Fountain House project, are held in the collection of the Museum of Modern Art in New York.

=== Machado Silvetti ===
Machado and Silvetti formally incorporated their practice as Machado and Silvetti Associates in Boston in 1985. The firm developed a practice encompassing architecture, urban design, museums, educational institutions, housing, and master planning in the United States and internationally.

In 2015, Stephanie Randazzo Dwyer and Jeffry Burchard became partners and design principals in the firm. In 2025, Machado and Silvetti stepped away from the day-to-day leadership of the practice and became Principal Emeriti, with Randazzo Dwyer and Burchard assuming leadership of the firm.

=== Recognition and awards ===
In 1991, Machado and Silvetti were the inaugural recipients of the Award in Architecture from the American Academy of Arts and Letters.

Machado and Silvetti Associates received three National Honor Awards from the American Institute of Architects: a 1993 award in architecture for the Princeton University Parking Structure, a 1998 award in urban design for Robert F. Wagner Jr. Park, and a 2003 award in architecture for the Honan-Allston Branch of the Boston Public Library.

In 2021, Machado and Silvetti jointly received the Boston Society for Architecture Award of Honor.

Machado's drawings and architectural projects have been exhibited in museums and galleries internationally. In 1995, he curated Monolithic Architecture at the Carnegie Museum of Art in Pittsburgh. The exhibition was accompanied by the book Monolithic Architecture, edited by Machado and Rodolphe el-Khoury.

The Frances Loeb Library at the Harvard Graduate School of Design holds the Rodolfo Machado and Jorge Silvetti Collection, which includes architectural drawings, models, photographs, project records, publications, and teaching materials documenting their professional and academic careers. Harvard presented selections from the collection in the 2022 exhibition Unprecedented Realism: Selections from the Rodolfo Machado and Jorge Silvetti Collection.

== Academia ==
Machado joined the faculty of Harvard University in 1986. At the Harvard Graduate School of Design, he served as Professor in Practice of Architecture and Urban Design from 1986 to 2010 and chaired the Department of Urban Planning and Design from 2004 to 2009. He is Professor in Practice of Architecture and Urban Design, Emeritus.

Before joining Harvard, Machado taught at Carnegie Mellon University and the Rhode Island School of Design, where he chaired the Department of Architecture from 1978 to 1986. The Rhode Island School of Design later established the Rodolfo Machado Lecture Fund in his honor.

Machado has also held visiting academic appointments as Jean Labatut Professor of Urbanism at Princeton University, Thomas Jefferson Professor in Architecture at the University of Virginia, Bishop Professor of Architecture at Yale University, and Smith Professor of Architecture at Rice University. He has lectured and served as a visiting critic at architecture schools in the United States and abroad, and has served as a juror for national and international architectural competitions and prizes.

== Notable projects ==
Notable projects for which Machado served as design principal, architect in charge, or principal architect include:

Vietnamese-German University campus, Bình Dương Province, Vietnam

- Vietnamese-German University campus, Bình Dương Province, Vietnam
- Princeton University Parking Structure, Princeton University, Princeton, New Jersey (1991)
- Robert F. Wagner Jr. Park, New York City
- Scully Hall, Princeton University, Princeton, New Jersey (1998)
- Wiess College Residence and Dining Hall, Rice University, Houston, Texas (2002)
- One Western Avenue Graduate Student Housing, Harvard University, Allston, Massachusetts (2003)
- Atelier 505, Boston, Massachusetts (2004)
- Hassayampa Academic Village, Arizona State University, Tempe, Arizona
- Mint Museum Uptown, Charlotte, North Carolina (2010)
- Silver Spring Civic Building and Veterans Plaza, Silver Spring, Maryland (2010)
- Expansion of the Chazen Museum of Art, Madison, Wisconsin (2011)
- Ruth and Elmer Wellin Museum of Art, Hamilton College, Clinton, New York (2012)
- Kevin and Karen Kennedy Center for Theatre and the Studio Arts, Hamilton College, Clinton, New York (2014)
- Center for Asian Art at the Ringling Museum of Art, Sarasota, Florida (2016)
- Polo DOT Office Park, Buenos Aires, Argentina (2019)

Polo DOT Office Park in Buenos Aires, Argentina

Machado served as design principal for the expansion of the Chazen Museum of Art. He was principal in charge of the Ruth and Elmer Wellin Museum of Art, architect in charge of Hamilton College's Kennedy Center for Theatre and the Studio Arts, and design architect for the Center for Asian Art at the Ringling Museum of Art. ArchDaily identifies Machado, Silvetti, and Nicolas Viterbo as lead architects for the Polo DOT Office Park.

Machado also designed master plans for Princeton University, the American University of Beirut, Dewey Square in Boston, and St. Albans School in Washington, D.C.

== Bibliography ==
A selection of writings and edited works by Machado:

- A Taxonomy of Environmental Significant Practices. University of California, Berkeley (1970).
- "Public Places for American Cities: Three Projects." Assemblage, no. 6 (1988): 98–113.
- "What Architecture Can Do." Center: A Journal for Architecture in America, vol. 6 (1990): 86–101.
- Monolithic Architecture, with Rodolphe el-Khoury (1995).
- "Domains of Architecture." In Unprecedented Realism: The Architecture of Machado and Silvetti (1995).
- "Urbanities." In Unprecedented Realism: The Architecture of Machado and Silvetti (1995).
- "Fictions on Fictions." In Unprecedented Realism: The Architecture of Machado and Silvetti (1995).
- "Afterword", with Jorge Silvetti. In Unprecedented Realism: The Architecture of Machado and Silvetti (1995).
- The Favela-Bairro Project: Jorge Mario Jáuregui Architects, editor (2003).
