= Jorge Silvetti =

Argentine-American architect and professor

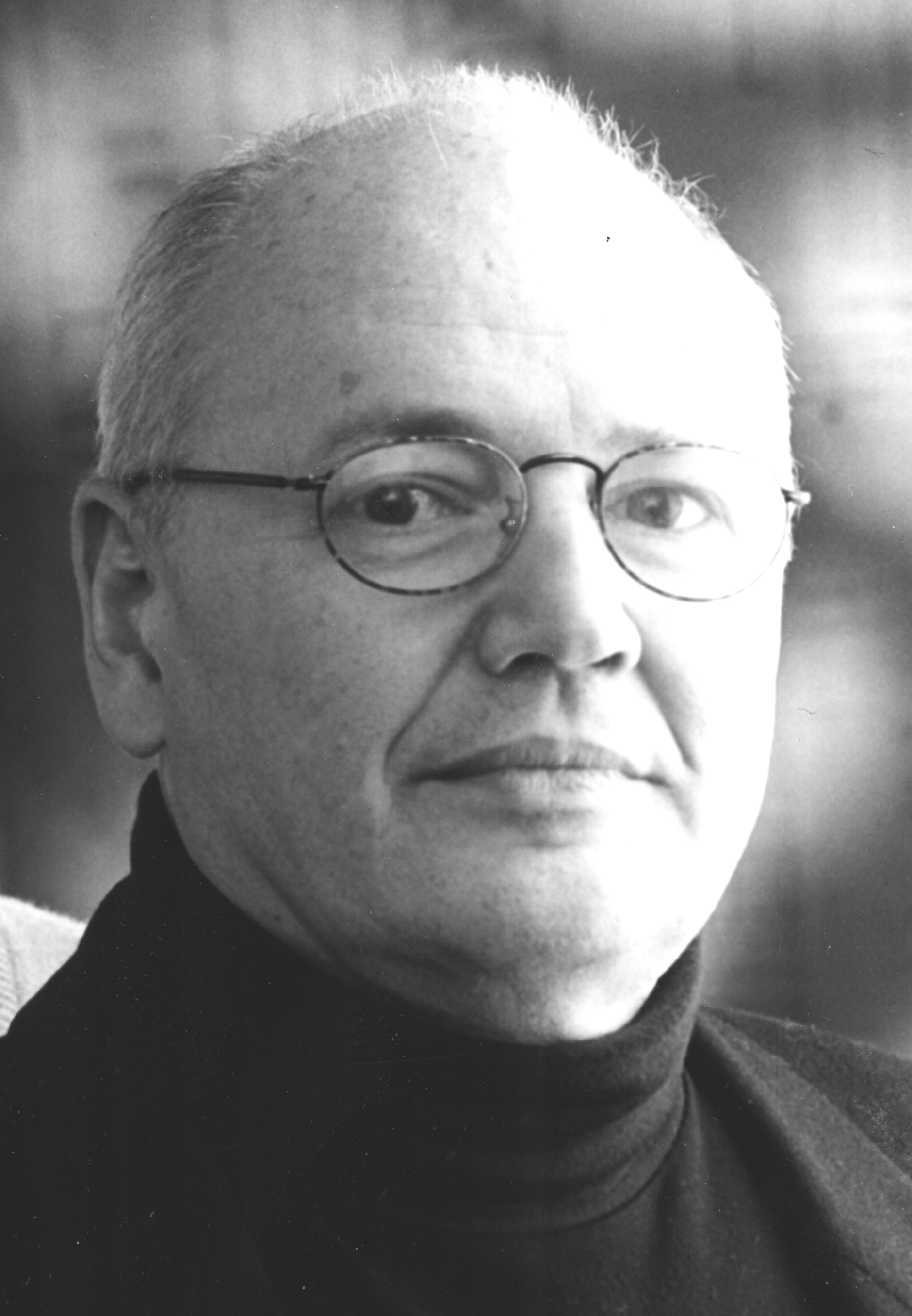
- Born: January 5, 1942 (age 84); Buenos Aires, Argentina
- Education: University of California, Berkeley, Universidad de Buenos Aires
- Occupation: Architect
- Practice: MACHADO SILVETTI
- Website: http://www.machado-silvetti.com/

Jorge Silvetti (born January 5, 1942) is an Argentine-American architect and educator. Silvetti co-founded Machado Silvetti—a Boston-based firm known for unique works of architecture and urban design in the United States and abroad—in 1985 with Rodolfo Machado, where he remains a partner. He is the Nelson Robinson, Jr. Professor of Architecture, Emeritus at the Harvard University Graduate School of Design, where he has taught since 1975, and chaired the department of architecture from 1995 to 2002.

== Early life and education ==
Born in Buenos Aires, Argentina, Silvetti studied Music at the Conservatorio de Música de Buenos Aires, in parallel to regular education, and later received his diploma in architecture from the Universidad de Buenos Aires in 1966. He continued his studies at the University of California, Berkeley, receiving his Master of Architecture degree in 1969 and pursuing post graduate work in the area of architectural theory and criticism.

== Career ==
Jorge Silvetti was one of the founding members of "Arquitectos Asociados" in 1965, an experimental group formed by six advanced architecture students (Miguel Baudizzone, Jorge Korn, Jorge Lestard, Rodolfo Machado, Tito Varas and Jorge Silvetti) at the Universidad de Buenos Aires, and two recent graduates (Jorge Erbin and Tony Diaz), working together in national and international competitions and developing research projects. In Buenos Aires, he apprenticed in the offices of Horacio Baliero, Carmen Córdova Iturburu, Francisco Bullrich and later in the United States with Donald Olsen, AIA in Berkeley, California.

Silvetti's professional architectural association with Rodolfo Machado, which continues today, began in the early 1970s when they were students and instructors at UC Berkeley, with experimental projects and freelance commissions, it continued in Pittsburgh, PA from 1973 to 1975 and then in Boston, MA in 1975 where it has remained. Some foundational projects of their partnership from this early period include: Fountain House in San Diego, California (1975); House in Djerba, Tunisia (1977); The Steps of Providence in Providence, Rhode Island (1978); House in Lake Pergusa, Sicily (1983), Taberna Ancipitis Formae: A Garden Folly in Natchez, Mississippi (1983) Four Public Squares Master Plan and The Tower for Leonforte, Sicily (1983).

=== Machado Silvetti ===
Jorge Silvetti and Rodolfo Machado formed Machado and Silvetti Associates, Inc., an architecture and urban design firm, in 1985 in Boston, Massachusetts. Their firm's work has been hailed for its, "conceptual clarity and visual intensity", and "the outstanding quality of their architectural principles." Architectural critic Michael Wise of the Los Angeles Times described Machado Silvetti as having, "a reputation for tasteful refinement, a keen sense of texture, and the ability to remain mindful of tradition while producing forms that are remarkably fresh." In 2008, with the objective of developing projects in Argentina and Latin America, the firm established an office in Buenos Aires. In 2015, Silvetti and Machado's firm expanded the partnership to include Stephanie Randazzo Dwyer and Jeffry Burchard. The expansion was marked by a rebranding of the firm, as, Machado Silvetti. Rodolfo Machado and Jorge Silvetti transitioned to positions of Principal Emeriti in 2025, following their retirement from active roles in the practice. Randazzo Dwyer and Burchard remain co-owners and Design Principals.

=== Recognition and awards ===
In 1991, Silvetti and Machado were the first ever recipients of the Award in Architecture by the American Academy of Arts and Letters for "boldly conceived and brilliantly executed projects" and for being "uncompromisingly dedicated to envisioning a meaningful architecture of the public realm." Silvetti was also the first person to receive Progressive Architecture awards in all its three categories: architecture, urban design, and research and has gone on to receive a total of twelve Progressive Architecture awards and citations through his practice at Machado Silvetti. He was awarded the mid-career Rome Prize from the American Academy in Rome for the year 1985-86. Silvetti served as a juror for the Pritzker Architecture Prize from 1996 to 2004 and regularly serves on juries for architectural competitions and awards. In 2000, he became a juror for the Mies van der Rohe Prize for Latin American Architecture. He was co-recipient of the 2021 Boston Society for Architecture Award of Honor, along with Rodolfo Machado, for their "outstanding contributions to architecture and to the profession."

Four monographs have been produced on Silvetti's office, Machado Silvetti: Rodolfo Machado and Jorge Silvetti: Buildings for Cities, ed. Peter Rowe (1989)., Casas 40: Rodolfo Machado & Jorge Silvetti, ed. Oscar Riera Ojeda (1995), Unprecedented Realism: The Architecture of Machado and Silvetti, by K. Michael Hays (1995), and The Work of Machado & Silvetti, by Javier Cenicacelaya, Iñigo Saloña (2018)

In 2022, Silvetti and Machado's archive was acquired by Harvard University Graduate School of Design and the Frances Loeb Library's, as the "Rodolfo Machado and Jorge Silvetti Collection." This collection includes original architectural drawings and models, photographs, teaching materials from their academic careers, and an extensive collection of publications by and about Silvetti and Machado. An exhibition, marking the acquisition of the collection and Silvetti's retirement from Harvard University, was presented at the Harvard University Graduate School of Design. The curators sought to, "reflect the evolution of the Machado and Silvetti architectural practice over the last five decades."

== Academia ==
Jorge Silvetti began his academic career in 1965 at Universidad de La Plata, Argentina as Teaching Assistant of the Taller of Profs. Mario Soto and Marcos Winograd and continued at the Universidad de Buenos Aires in the Taller of Prof. Juan Manuel Borthagaray until the violent episode of "The Night of the Long Batons" (July 29, 1966) with the dismantling of the University under the military regime. He taught at University of California, Berkeley after completing his graduate work and later as Assistant Professor at Carnegie-Mellon University (1973–75). Since 1975, he has taught architecture at the Harvard Graduate School of Design, where he became Professor of Architecture in Design and Design Theory in 1983, was Director of the Master of Architecture program from 1985 to 1990, and was named Nelson Robinson, Jr. Professor of Architecture in 1990. From 1995 to 2002, he chaired the Department of Architecture at Harvard. He has also taught at the Polytechnic Institute of Zurich, the University of Palermo, Sicily and Nihon University, Tokyo besides other prestigious universities. He retired from teaching in 2022, becoming the Nelson Robinson, Jr Professor of Architecture, Emeritus.

Silvetti was honored as the recipient of the 2018 American Institute of Architects/Association of Collegiate Schools of Architecture Topaz Medallion for Architectural Education, which recognizes, "outstanding individual contributions in architectural education" and is the, "highest award the organizations make to an educator." In a supporting letter for his nomination, Mónica Ponce de León, dean and professor at Princeton University's School of Architecture, wrote, "As chair of the architecture program at Harvard, his emphasis on design as a form of research, coupled with his expansion of the field of architecture to include other design practices, had a profound effect on the discipline at large—an influence that can still be felt today."

== Notable projects ==
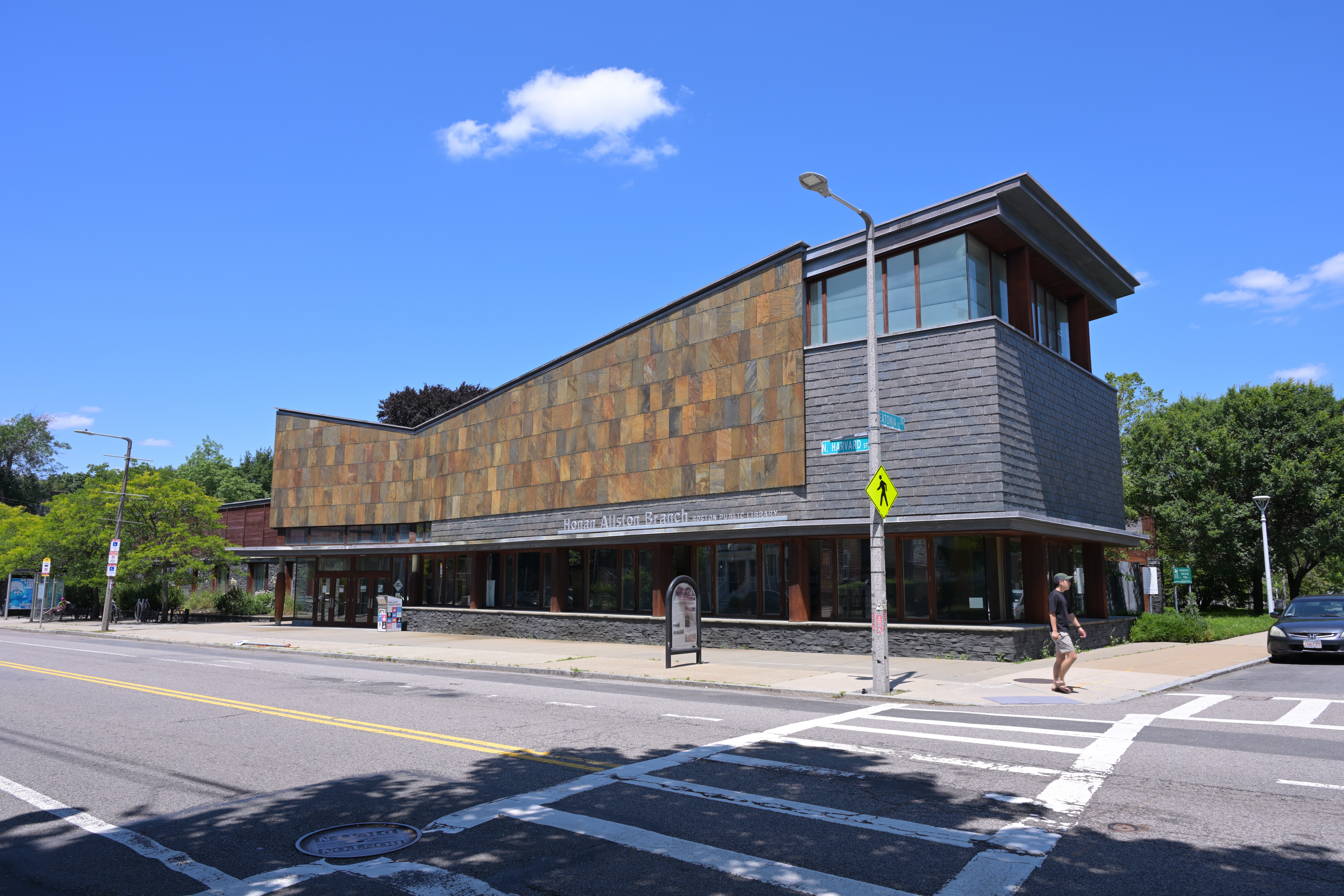
Boston Public Library, Honan-Allston Branch, Boston, MA (2001)

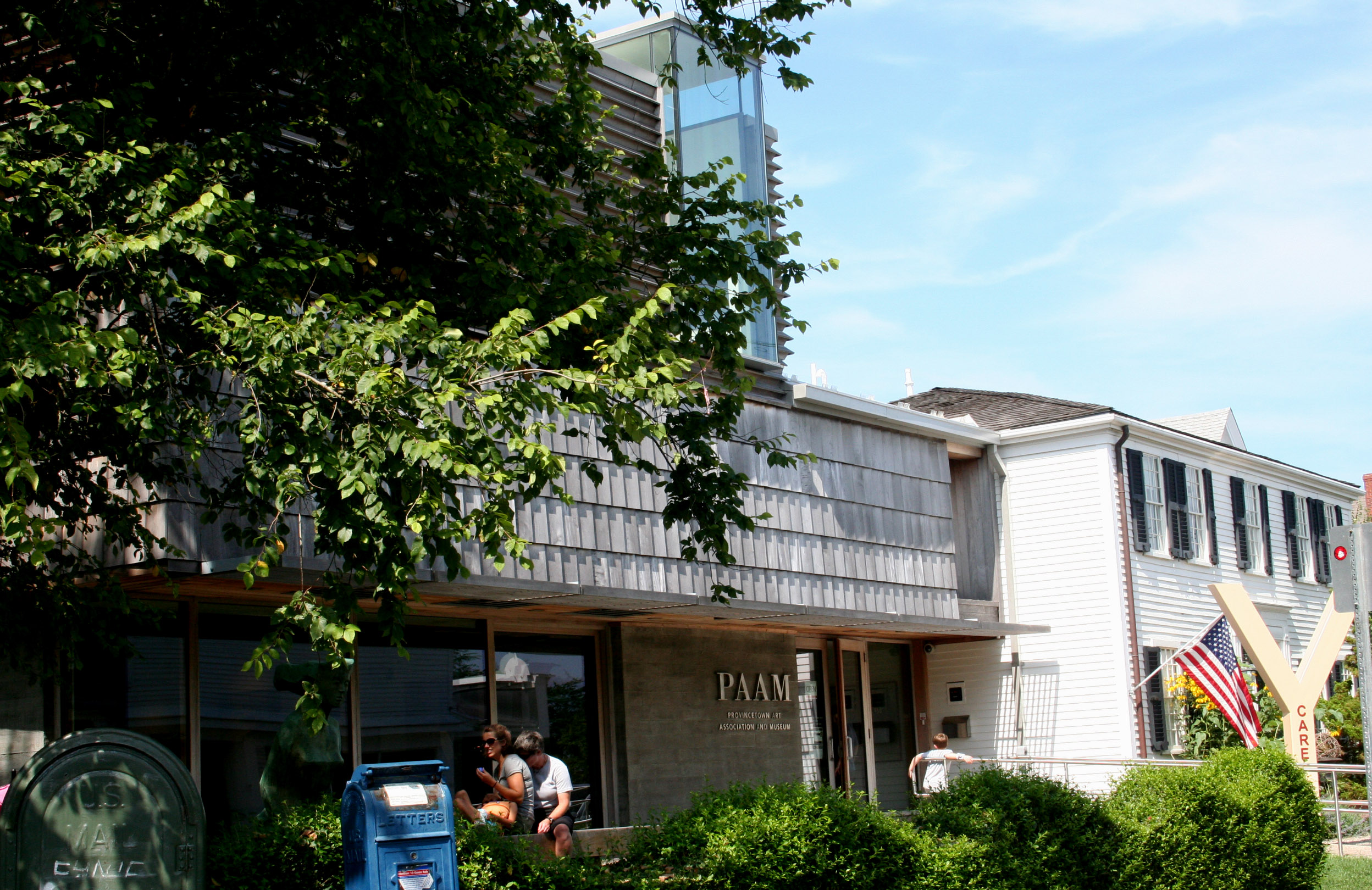
Provincetown Art Association and Museum, Provincetown, MA (2006);

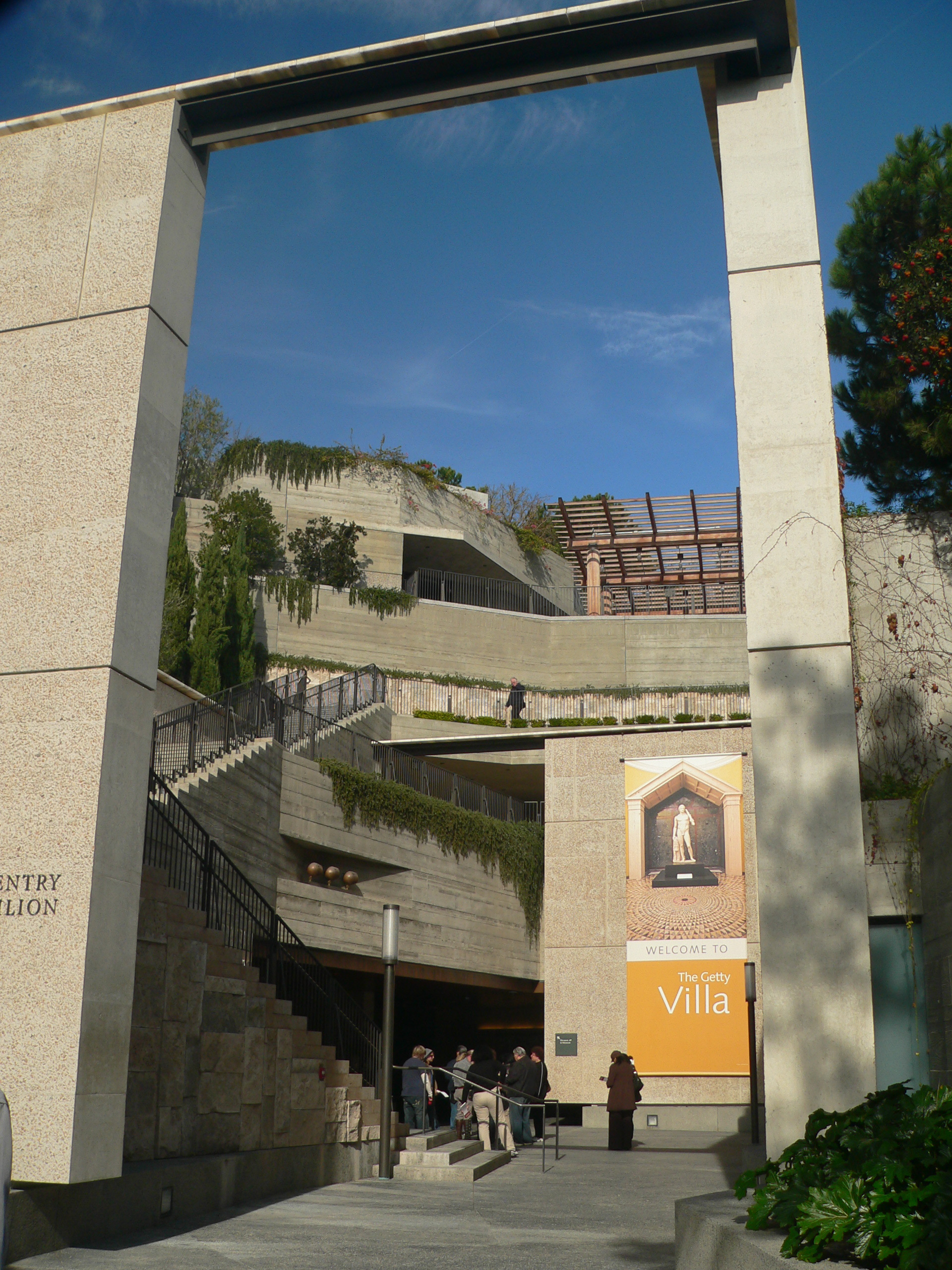
The Getty Villa, Malibu, CA (2006)

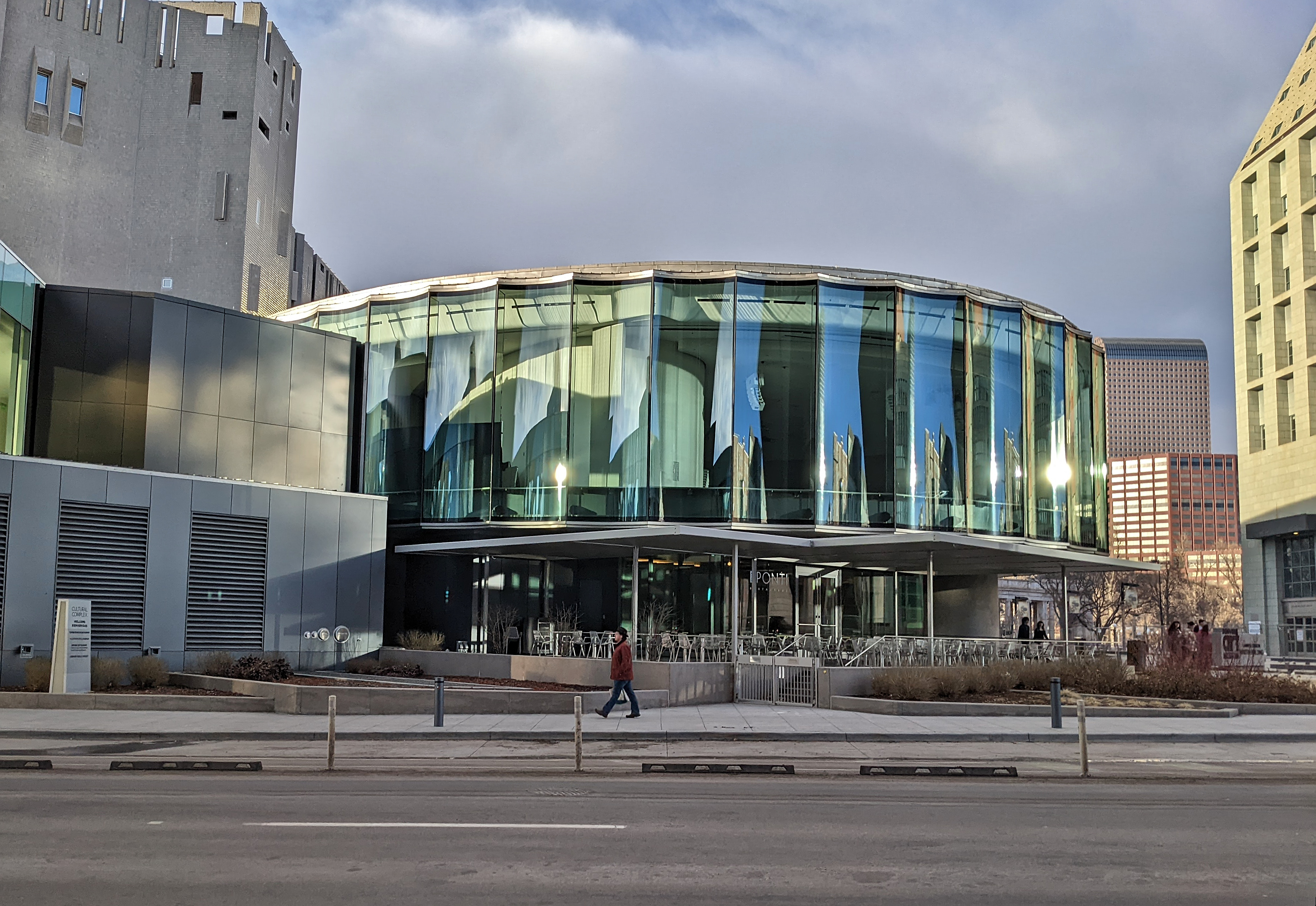
Denver Art Museum Expansion and Revitalization, Denver, CO (2019)

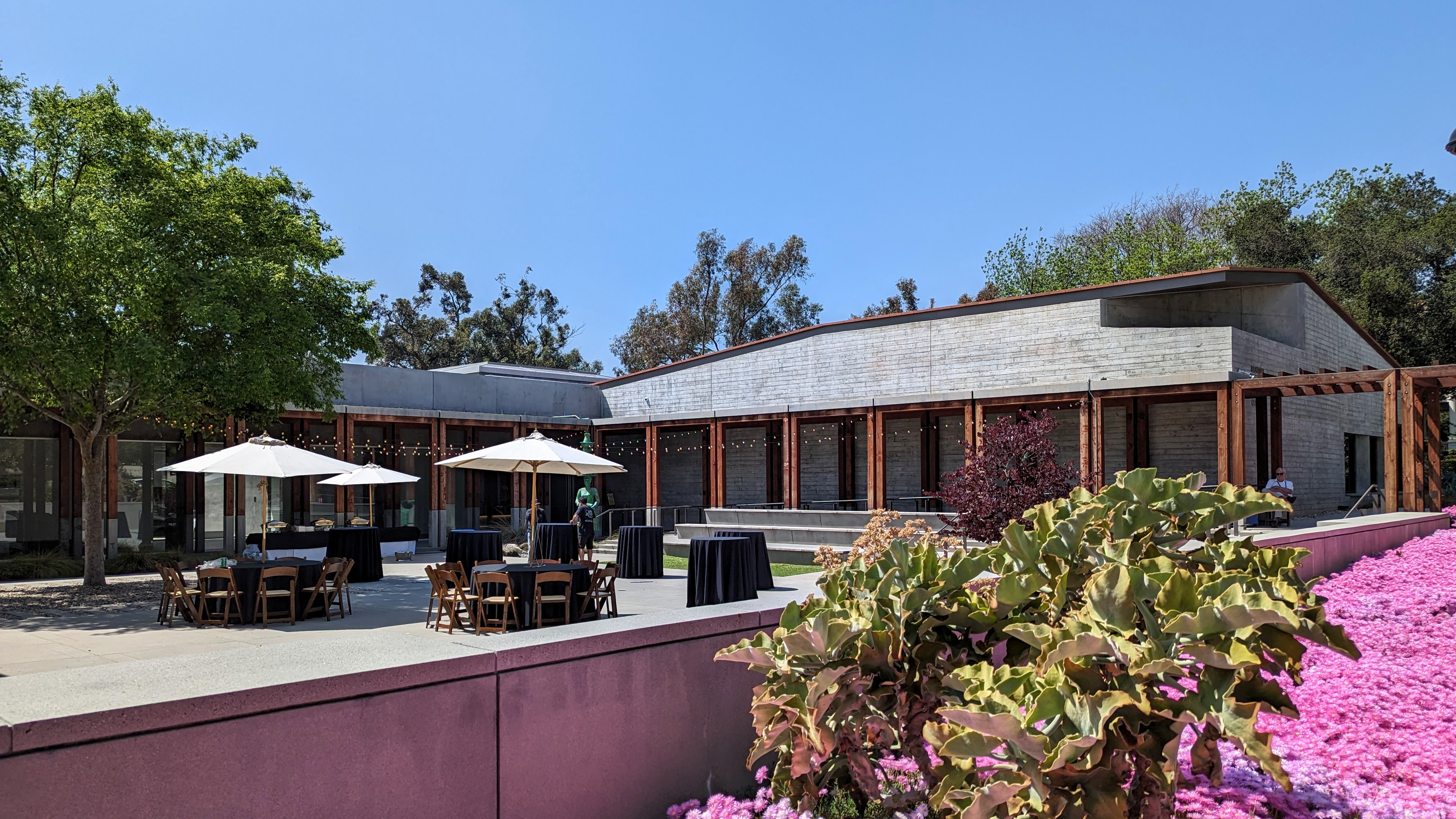
Benton Museum of Art at Pomona College, Claremont, CA (2020)

Notable Machado Silvetti projects for which Silvetti served as design principal include:

- Boston Public Library, Honan-Allston Branch, Boston, MA (2001);
- Rockefeller Stone Barns Adaptive Reuse, Pocantico, NY (2004);
- Provincetown Art Association and Museum, Provincetown, MA (2006);
- The Getty Villa, Malibu, CA (2006);
- Bowdoin College Museum of Art Expansion and Renovation, Brunswick, ME (2007);
- Black Family Visual Arts Center, Dartmouth College, Hanover, NH (2012);
- Global Center for Academic and Spiritual Life, New York University, New York, NY (2012);
- Al Ain Oasis Cultural Master Plan, Al Ain, Abu Dhabi, UAE (2012);
- Tun Razak Exchange Financial District Master Plan, Kuala Lumpur, Malaysia (2013);
- Qasr Al Muwaiji Research Center and Exhibit, Al Ain, Abu Dhabi, UAE (2014);
- Museo Territorio Guaraní (un-built), Posadas, Argentina (proposed 2016)
- Benton Museum of Art, Pomona College [JD11], Claremont, CA (2019);
- Denver Art Museum Expansion and Revitalization, Denver, CO (2019);
- Menokin Exhibition and Conservation Center, Warsaw, VA (ongoing)

== Bibliography ==
A selection of writings by Silvetti:

- "The Beauty of Shadows." Oppositions 9. The MIT Press (1977): 43-61.
- "On Realism in Architecture." The Harvard Architectural Review (1978): 9-31.
- "Representation and Creativity in Architecture: The Pregnant Moment, in Representation and Architecture." Information Dynamics, Inc. (1982): 159-184.
- "Perspektive und der eindische Blick auf die Renaissance (Perspective and the Envious Longing for the Renaissance)." DAIDALOS, Berlin Architectural Journal, #11 (March 1984): 10-21.
- "Afterword" (with Rodolfo Machado). Unprecedented Realism. Princeton Architectural Press (1995): 259.
- "The Muses Are Not Amused: Pandemonium in the House of Architecture." Architecture as Conceptual Art, Harvard Design Magazine, no. 19 (2003): 22-33.
- "Effective Affinities." Interdisciplinary Design: New Lessons from Architecture and Engineering (2012): 4-9.
- "Block That Metaphor!" The Return of Nature: Sustaining Architecture in the Face of Sustainability (2014): 197-209.
- "The bridge of San Francisco and Palazzo Santa Elia." Interactive Realms: The Bridge of San Francesco and the Palazzo Sant'Elia, Architectural and Urban Environments of Sicily, vol. 2 (1992): 1-22.
- "Buenos Aires: A Tale of Two Cities." In the Life of Cities (2012): 137-152.
- "Vestiges of cities without evil: the case of the territorio guaraní" (with Graciela Silvestri). Manifest 2 (2014): 24-39.
- Paths, Sounds, Ruins: Imagining Architecture in Candelaria (with Erika Naginski) (2017).
- "Some Thoughts About Our Design Process in the Addition and Renovations of the Denver Art Museum." Oz, Style, vol. 42 (2020): 30-35.
- "An Architect Reflection on Expanding the Denver Art Museum." Gio Ponti in the American West (2020): 116-127.
- "The Ponti Question." The Lanny and Sharon Martin Building (2021): 81-100.
- "On Perspective, Anamorphosis and Repositionings: Labyrinth of Affinities" (with Nicolás Delgado Alcega) Pairs, no. 02 (2021): 110–125.
