= Pier A =

Pier A may refer to the following places in the United States:

- Pier A Park, in Hoboken, New Jersey
- City Pier A, in Battery Park, New York City
