= Utah Museum of Fine Arts =

The Utah Museum of Fine Arts (UMFA)

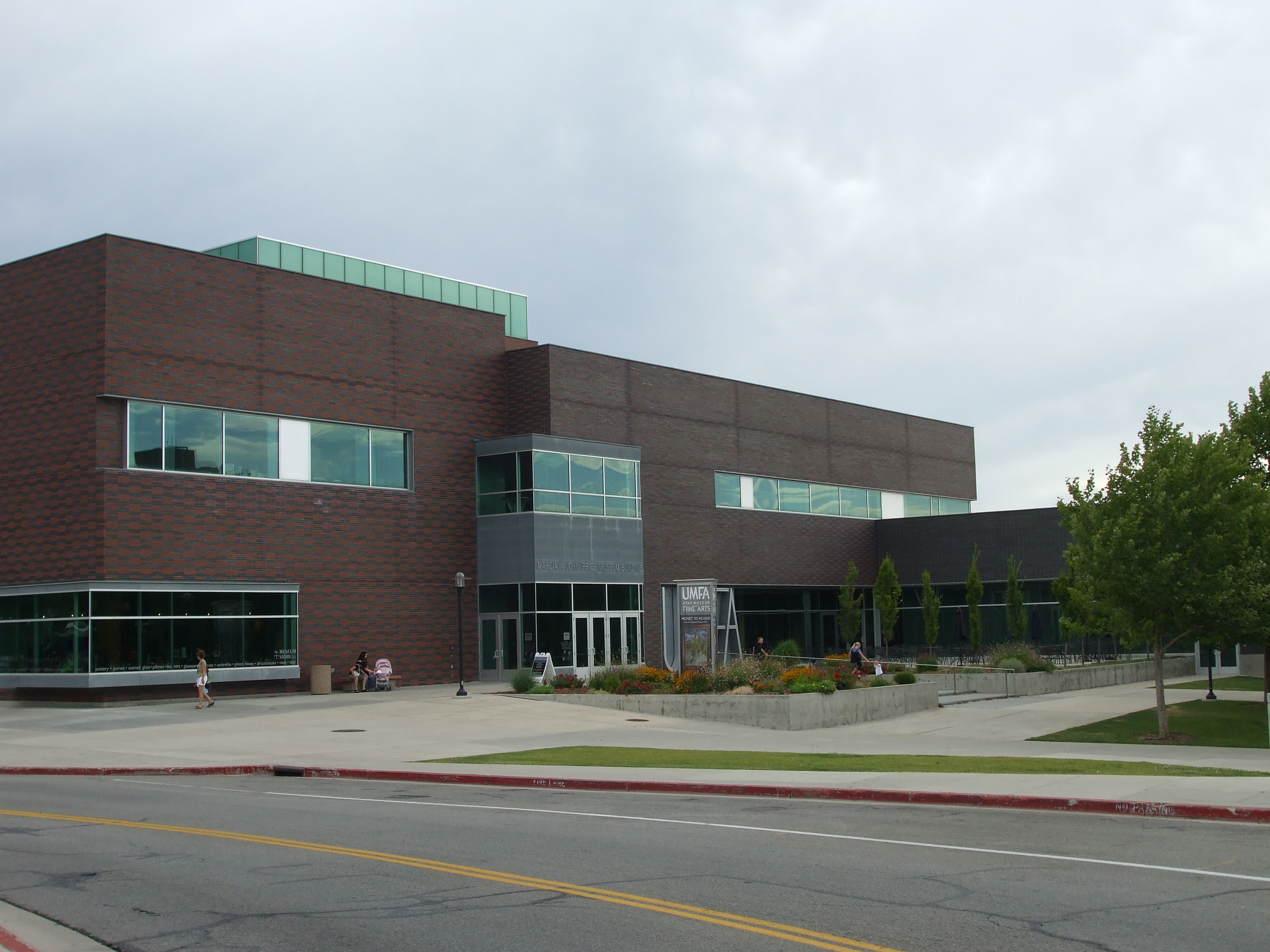
- UMFA in 2008
- Established: May 6, 1951
- Location: University of Utah; Marcia & John Price Museum Building; 410 Campus Center Drive; Salt Lake City, Utah 84112
- Coordinates: 40.7602°N 111.8432°W
- Type: Art museum
- Accreditation: American Alliance of Museums
- Director: Gretchen Dietrich
- Architects: Machado Silvetti and Prescott Muir Architects
- Public transit access: Red Line (TRAX); University South Campus station
- Website: umfa.utah.edu

The Utah Museum of Fine Arts (UMFA) is a state and university art museum located in downtown Salt Lake City on the University of Utah campus. Housed in the Marcia and John Price Museum Building near Rice-Eccles Stadium, the museum holds a permanent collection of nearly 20,000 art objects. Works of art are displayed on a rotating basis.

== Overview ==
UMFA is accredited by the American Alliance of Museums. It has a cafe and store located inside the building along with more than 20 galleries. The museums permanent art collections include over 22,000 works of art. The different cultures represented include African, Oceanic and the New World, Asian, European, American, and the Ancient and Classical World.

== History ==
The creation of a formal art gallery on the top floor of the University of Utah's Park Building in the early 1900s marks the beginning of the Utah Museum of Fine Arts. In the beginning, paintings by local artists filled this three-room gallery. Through the next six decades, the art department at the University of Utah received major art gifts and specific requests from donors to remodel the gallery into a museum. After the renovation of the gallery was finished, the university's president, A. Ray Olpin, established it as the Utah Museum of Fine Arts on May 6, 1951. In 1967, Frank Sanquineti was appointed as the first professional director. By this time, the museum had entered a new period of growth which resulted in the building of a new museum.

After the museum relocated in 1970, the Annual Friends of the Art Museum Acquisition Fund was formed to further expand its collections. Over the years this annual fund has helped support the expansion of the museum's collections and its ability to offer art education programs. Due to donations from patrons, local and national foundations, the university community, and the citizens of the State of Utah, the UMFA's collection now encompasses 5,200 years of artistic creativity. Since the mid-1900s, when the collection was around 800 objects, it has grown to over 13,000 art objects. This huge expansion required a larger building. Machado Silvetti and Prescott Muir Architects were chosen to design the new museum building. The UMFA opened the 70,000-square-foot (6,500 m^{2}) facility named for Marcia and John Price on June 2, 2001. David Dee was appointed executive director the following year.

Since the second relocation, the UMFA experienced growth in all areas of operation. In February 2005, the Utah State Legislature declared the UMFA as an official state institution, confirming the importance of the museum's role as a center for art, culture, and education in the state of Utah. In April 2009, David Dee resigned from the museum and Gretchen Dietrich was named executive director effective August 2010.

== Collections ==
As of 2017, the UMFA held a collection of over 22,000 art objects.

Works of the European tradition from the 14th to the 19th centuries include such artists as Filippo Lippi, Pieter Brueghel the Younger, Jan Brueghel the Younger, Anthony van Dyck, Giovanni Paolo Panini, Hyacinthe Rigaud, Jean-Honoré Fragonard, Élisabeth Vigée Le Brun, Thomas Gainsborough, Jean-Baptiste-Camille Corot, and Auguste Rodin. Represented American artists include Benjamin West, Gilbert Stuart, Thomas Cole, Albert Bierstadt, Edmonia Lewis, and John Singer Sargent. Modern and contemporary holdings include Helen Frankenthaler, Yayoi Kusama, Nancy Holt, and Robert Smithson. The museum's non-Western collections have particular strength in works from India, Polynesia, and Mesoamerica.

=== Restitution of art stolen in the Holocaust ===
In August 2004, the museum learned that an oil painting that had been stolen during The Holocaust had found its way into the museum's collection by donation in 1993. The museum returned the art to the heirs of its original owner. The piece was the 18th-century Les Amoureaux Jeunes by François Boucher. It had been stolen by Nazi Hermann Göring from the collection of French Jewish art gallery owner Andre Jean Seligmann during the Nazi occupation of France. Suzanne Seligmann Robbins, Andre Seligmann's daughter-in-law, said: "Honor this museum and the people in it and the University of Utah for what they have done with such honor, with such diligence, with such integrity."

== Events and programs ==
The Utah Museum of Fine Arts offers family, adult and children's programs along with tours for visitors. Activities include self-guided visits of the galleries, hands-on art projects, films, lectures, and informative guided tours. Family programs offer studio art activities on the third Saturday of each month. Adult programs include painting classes, lectures, and fine arts film series. Children's programs include special summer classes where children may combine history with art making. There are also classes for parents and their children from ages 2–5 to learn how to paint and sculpt.

== Past exhibitions ==
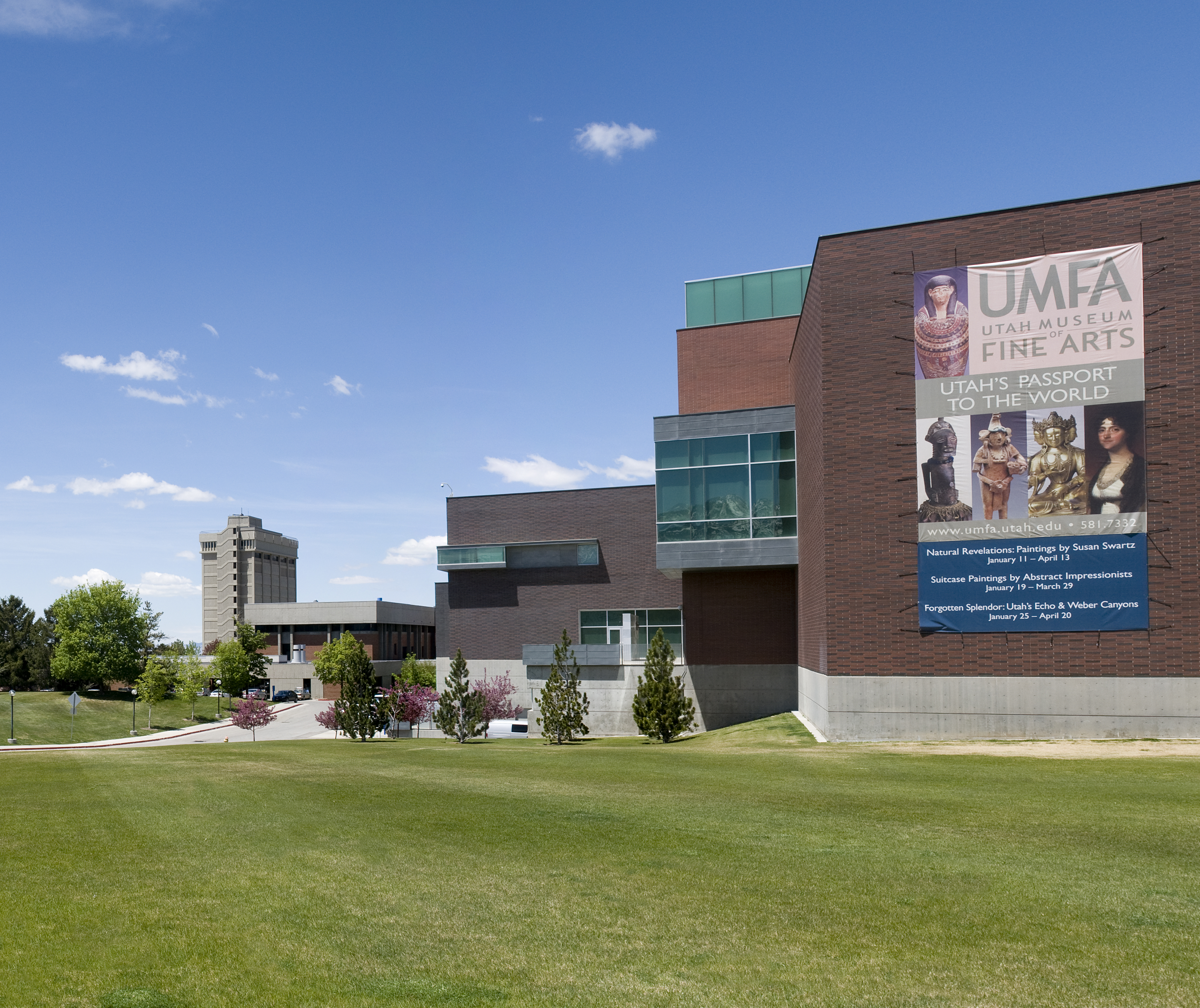
UMFA in 2016

Exhibitions at the Utah Museum of Fine Arts generally change on a two to three month basis. Some examples of past exhibitions since 2007 include:

- Power Couples: The Pendant Format in Art, curated by Leslie Anderson. This exhibition showcased art from the 16th century through the present that reflected ideas of daily life and social hegemony within various cultures and societies. Each of the artworks on display were created in pendant format, an art form that presents a single work of art in two parts (Jul. 11, 2019 – Dec. 8, 2019).
- American and Regional Art: Mythmaking & Truth-Telling, curated by Leslie Anderson, re-envisions the museum's American and regional galleries to present depictions and themes of westward expansion and migration throughout the 19th century. (2018 – ongoing).
- The British Passion for Landscape: Masterpieces from National Museum Wales (Aug. 28 - Dec. 13 2015) was a world-class exhibition of masterworks from Amgueddfa Cymru-National Museum Wales, charting the development of landscape painting in Britain from the 17th to the 20th century, including works by Claude Lorrain, Richard Wilson, Thomas Gainsborough, John Constable, J. M. W. Turner, and Claude Monet.
- Splendid Heritage: Perspective on American Indian Art (February 10, 2009 – March 1, 2010) premiered an exhibition of cultural and artistic treasures from the John and Marva Warnock Collection with 149 objects from the native people of the Northeast and Plains.
- Monet to Picasso from the Cleveland Museum of Art (June 23 – Sept. 21 2008) included Impressionist, Post-Impressionist and Early Modernist paintings from 100 years of European masterworks in an international touring exhibition.
- Suitcase Paintings: Small Scale Work by Abstract Expressionists (Jan. 19 – Mar. 29 2008) which included around sixty works of intense beauty that exhibited energy found in larger works.
- Andy Warhol's Dream America: Screen prints from the Collection of the Jordan Schnitzer Family Foundation (Oct. 4, 2007 – Jan. 6 2008) included around 100 screen prints by internationally acclaimed artist Andy Warhol.
- Cinderella: Masks, Magic and Mirrors (Sept. 2 – Mar. 31 2008) which included materials from Asia, Africa, Europe, and the Americas. This exhibit explored key themes from Cinderella including the magical mirror.
- Picturing the West: Masterworks of 19th Century Landscape Photography (Oct. 6 – Dec. 30 2007) included 32 nineteenth-century American Western landscape photographs.

== See also ==
- Mormon art
