= Boston Public Library, Honan-Allston Branch =

Coordinates: 42°21′35.9″N 71°07′41.3″W

Honan-Allston Branch
- Location: Allston, Massachusetts
- Established: 1889
- Architect: Machado and Silvetti Associates

Collection
- Size: 50,000

Other information
- Director: Carin O'Connor
- Website: http://www.bpl.org/branches/allston.htm

The Honan-Allston Branch of the Boston Public Library is located at 300 North Harvard Street in Lower Allston. The 57,000 square feet (5,300 m^{2}) building opened in 2001 at a cost of $6.5 million, replacing a former branch closed in 1981. The library itself contains an area of 20,000 square feet (1,900 m^{2}). The materials used to build the library include slate panels, shingles and rough sculpings, unfinished iron-wood cladding, and wood windows.

The Honan-Allston branch has more than 50,000 items for adults, teenagers and children. There is a large literacy collection, as well as more than 100 newspapers and magazines subscriptions. The Honan-Allston Branch has partnered with the Jackson Mann School and the Jackson Mann Community Center as part of Mayor Menino's Community Learning Initiative, a multi-department collaboration aimed at helping Boston's youth reach their full capacity by combining learning and recreation.

== History ==
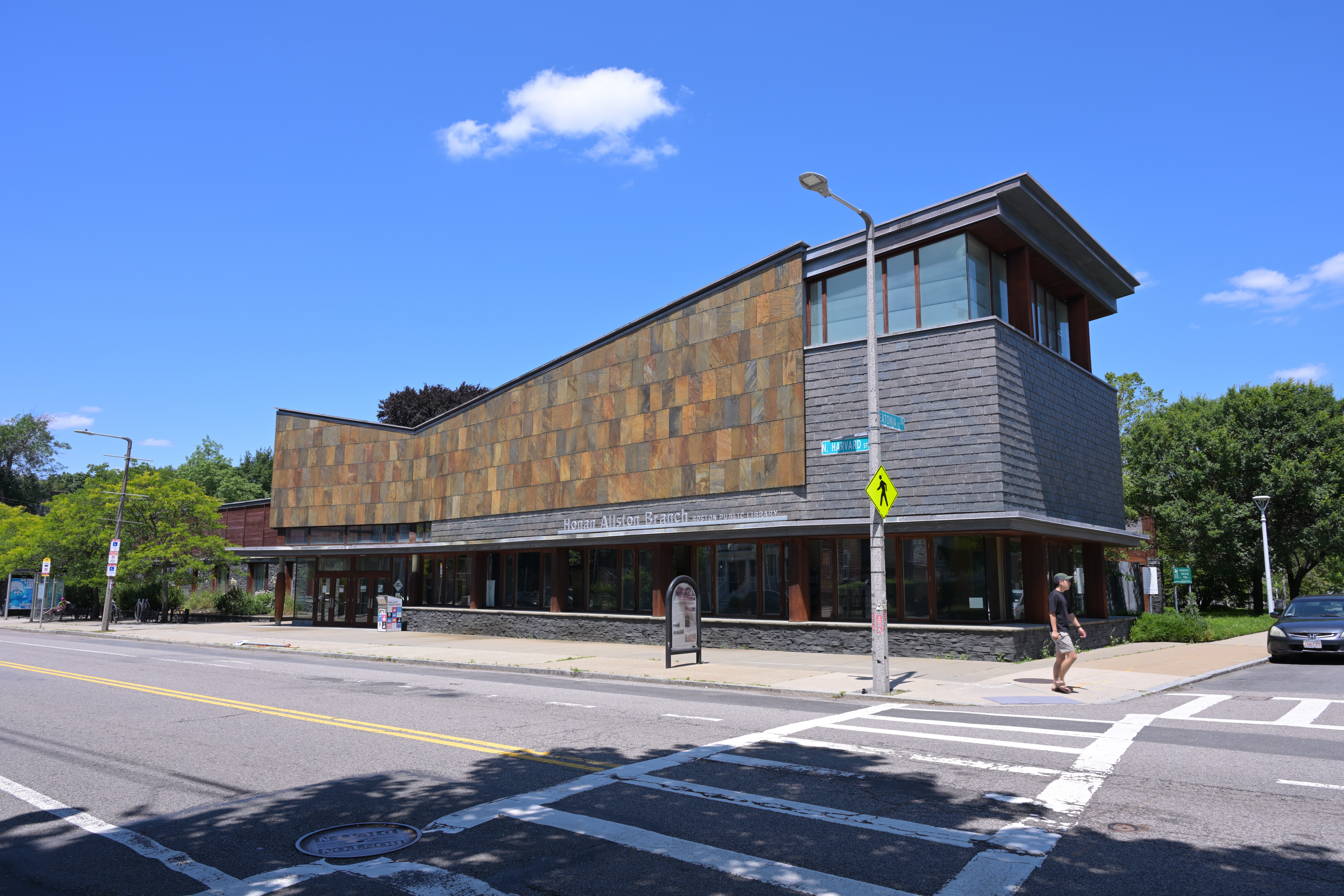
The Honan-Allston Branch Library building in 2025

Library service began in 1889 in a delivery station in Frank Howe's drugstore at 26 Franklin Street. Horse-drawn carriages delivered books from other branch libraries to local businesses, which in turn displayed the books for customers. The demand for books increased as the delivery station grew, and volunteers organized expanded library services. In 1905, the Allston Reading Room at 354 Cambridge Street replaced the 16-year-old delivery station. A Boston Public Library librarian staffed the reading room. It became a full-service branch of the Boston Public Library in 1924.

The branch moved to rented space at 161 Harvard Avenue in 1929, and in 1979 celebrated its 90th anniversary. In 1981, amid statewide budget cuts, the branch was closed. Neighborhood groups lobbied for its reinstatement, however. In 1993, Mayor Menino said he would advocate construction of a new branch in the neighborhood. On January 19, 2000, ground was broken for the new facility. Designed by Machado and Silvetti Associates, the branch officially opened on June 16, 2001. On March 13, 2003, the branch was renamed the Honan-Allston branch in honor of the late City Councilor Brian Honan, who died in 2002. He served Brighton and Allston's District 9 from 1996–2002. In 2006, tree guards and bicycle racks designed by sculptor Rich Duca were added to the property.

== Programs ==
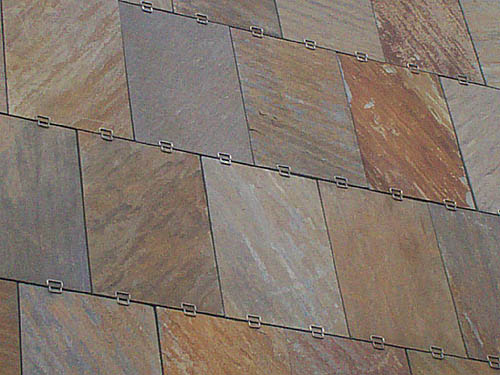
A close-up of the slate panels Machado and Silvetti Associates used for part of the library's exterior wall

For adults, the Honan-Allston Branch offers a monthly book discussion group, weekly English for Speakers of Other Languages (ESOL) conversation groups and basic computer instruction. Children's activities include storytimes for babies through preschoolers, creative drama instruction, chess instruction, summer reading activities, hands-on science programs and a playgroup for young children and their caregivers.

Computers are available throughout the branch for the public to use for office software, library catalogs and databases and the Internet. Laptop-friendly tables and study carrels are located in the adult reading area; each has a power source at the seat and access to wired and wireless Internet connections.

A large function room for events and meetings also holds a Yamaha baby grand piano; a private study room for small groups and a conference room for meetings and activities are also available for public use. All of the meeting rooms have wired Internet access. In addition, an art gallery showcases monthly exhibits by local artists and organizations. Semi-annual book sales are also held in these back rooms.

The Honan-Allston Branch has seen extensive community use of these spaces, including student piano recitals, a teen video production program, a monthly Asian languages "meetup" group and large meetings by local civic groups. Patrons can also obtain museum passes for various Boston organizations, including the Boston Children's Museum, New England Aquarium, Harvard Museum of Natural History, Harvard University Art Museums, Museum of Fine Arts, Boston, Museum of Science and the Wheelock Family Theatre.

== Raymond V. Mellone Park ==
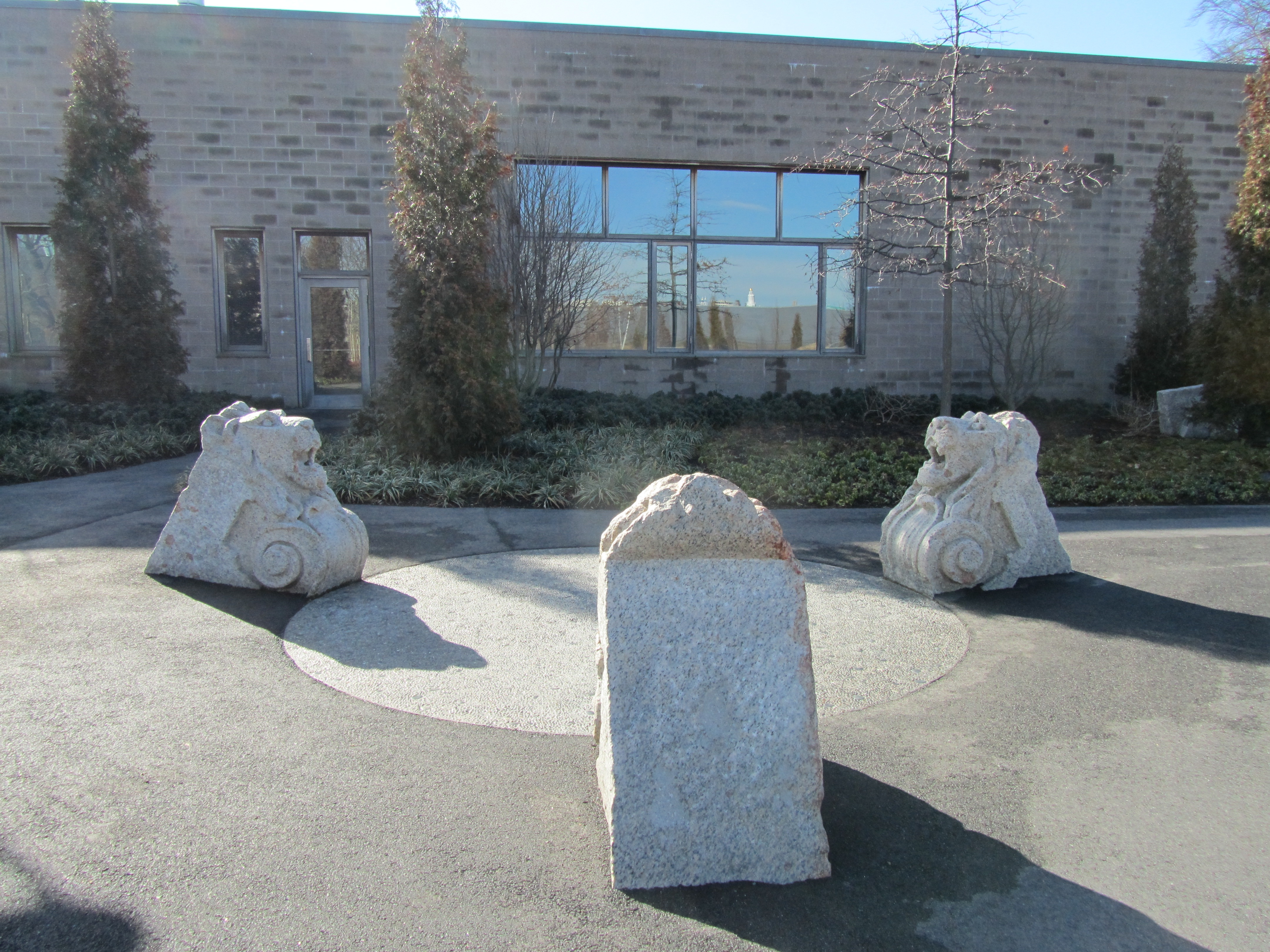
The misting fountain built with granite lion heads, in winter of 2012

In July 2011, the branch opened its new 1.74-acre park, called Library Park and located at the rear of the library building, to the public. The park was created on the one-time site of a concrete plant through a partnership among Harvard University, the Boston Redevelopment Authority, the Boston Parks & Recreation Department, the Boston Public Library, and members of the Allston-Brighton community. Harvard also committed to 10 years of park maintenance using sustainable techniques such as organic fertilizer. The park's planning and design team included the landscape architectural firm Michael Van Valkenburgh Associates Inc. and representatives from Harvard and the Boston Redevelopment Authority.

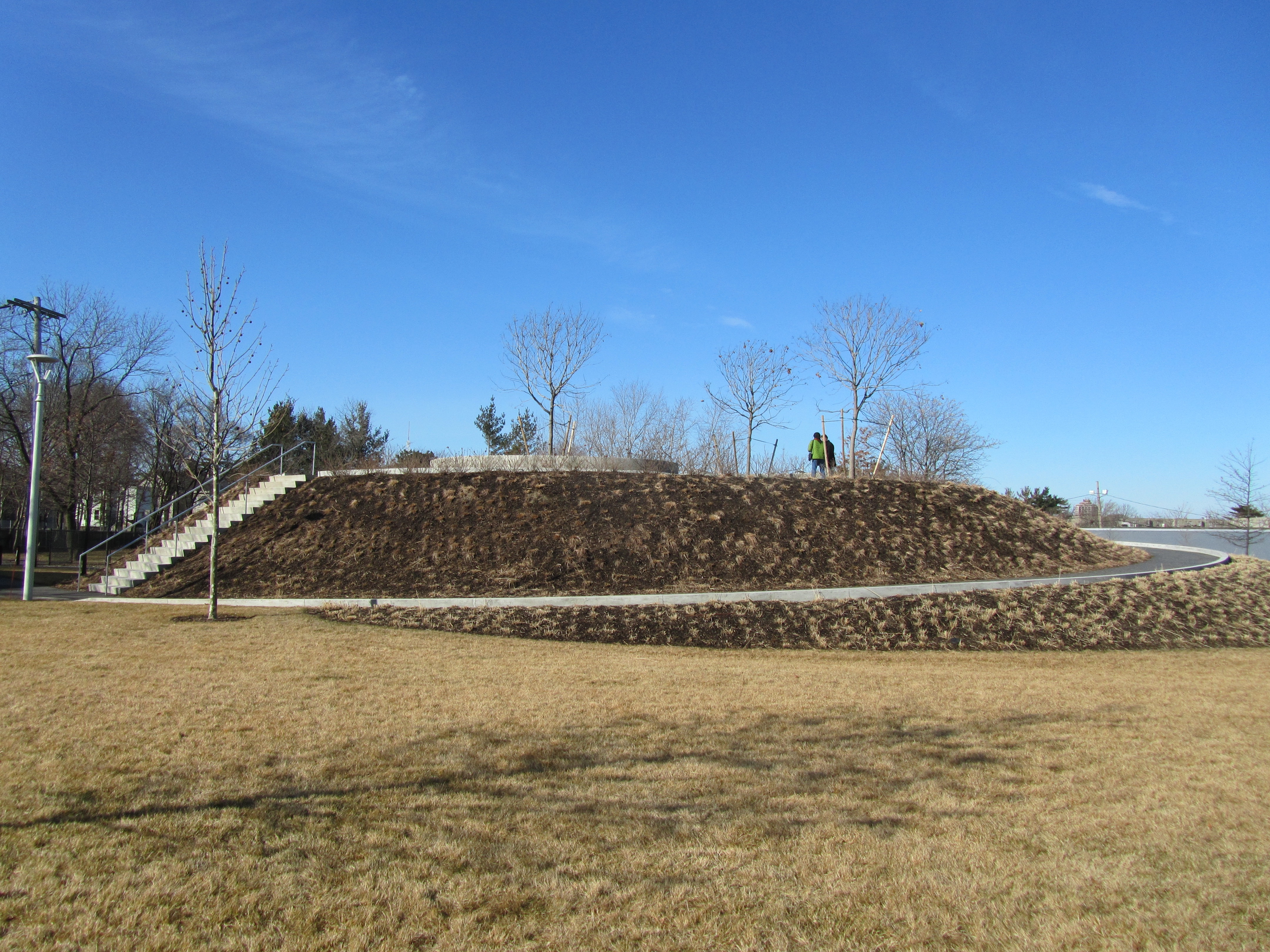
The hilltop at Raymond V. Mellone Park, in winter of 2012

Construction began in 2009 and drew heavily upon residents' and patrons' suggestions. A water feature was not included in the plans, although patrons asked for one that could include a fountain or stream. Instead, a funnel feature will redirect rainwater to a small wild garden at the north section of the park, thus allowing for sustainability and the reduction of flooding in the neighborhood. A misting feature was added, as well, with three granite lions as the spouts, and an additional fourth lion hidden to the side. In 2013, the four lions were named by neighborhood children, winners of a naming contest, and plaques were added to the statues.

In November 2011, Library Park was renamed Raymond V. Mellone Park, in honor of Mellone, a Brighton native, Korean War veteran and who served on the Boston Rent Control Board and with the Transportation Department, among other agencies. The finished park includes a quarter-mile of pathways, as well as half an acre of open space, a winding path to the east of the park and a coiled, low-incline ramp up a hilltop to the west. One hundred and fifty trees and other foliage around the park's border surround an open lawn in the center, along with a misting fountain built with three granite lion heads, salvaged from a Western Ave. business. Some areas are meant to encourage residents to use the park for gatherings or educational purposes. The park's eastern area features an open-air "classroom" for public and library programming and has space for 50 people. A 14-foot (4.3 m) hill was constructed near the rear of the library itself. Patrons can visit a flat meeting area at the top by climbing one of two staircases or by walking around coiled pathway to the top.
