= Wagner Park =

Park in Manhattan, New York

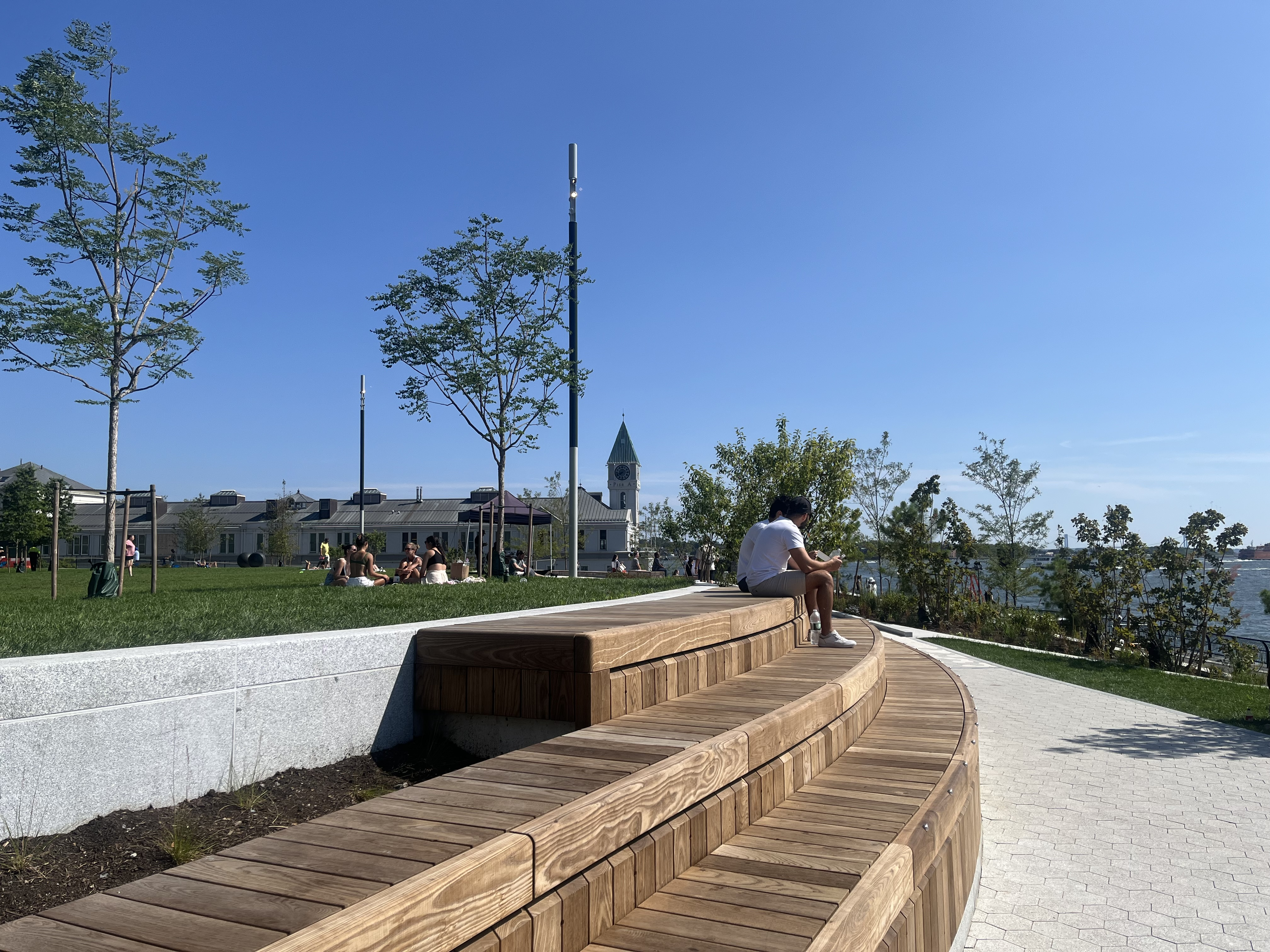
- The park in 2025
- Interactive map of Wagner Park
- Location: Battery Park City, Manhattan, New York
- Coordinates: 40°42′19″N 74°1′7″W
- Created: 1996
- Etymology: Robert F. Wagner Jr.
- Status: Open

Robert F. Wagner Jr. Park (also known as Wagner Park) is a green space in the Battery Park City neighborhood of Manhattan, New York City.

== History ==
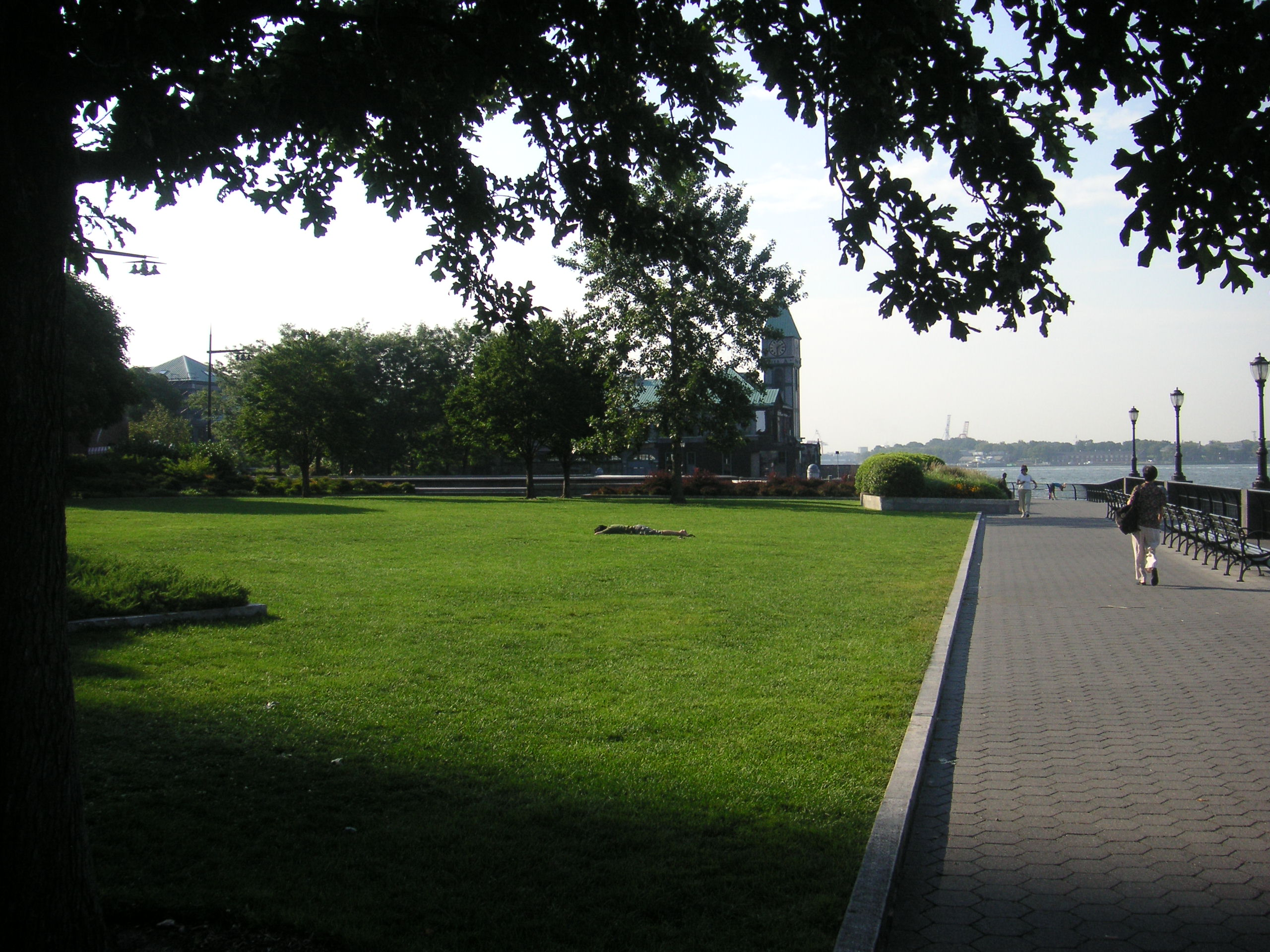
The park's lawn and esplanade in 2007, prior to reconstruction

The park is sited on landfill from the World Trade Center site and opened in 1996. It was designed through a partnership of Rodolfo Machado, Jorge Silvetti, Hannah/Olin, and Lynden B. Miller.

The park’s pavilion, designed by Thomas Phifer, contains event spaces, restaurant, classrooms, and rooftop deck.

The park is named after Robert F. Wagner Jr., who helped negotiate the 1979 master plan for Battery Park City before his sudden death in 1991. The park is just north of City Pier A at the southern end of Manhattan.

=== South Battery Park City Resiliency Project ===
In 2022, the Battery Park City Authority announced plans to demolish and rebuild the park. The park reconstruction was part of the Lower Manhattan Coastal Resiliency flood-resiliency project. Thomas Phifer and AECOM were hired to design the new park. The park demolition attracted opposition from local residents. In response to the public pressure, the Battery Park City Authority enlarged the area dedicated to lawns in the plans, although the rebuilt lawns would still contain 10 percent less green space. The park was temporarily closed for reconstruction beginning in March 2023.

Wagner Park reopened on July 29, 2025, after the $296 million renovation was complete. Compared with the original design, the rebuilt park has 48 fewer trees. It was raised from 11 to 20 feet (3.4 to 6.1 m), where 139 trees would be planted, and the shoreline has pools and other features that provide habitats for marine life. There are also gardens and a 63,000-U.S.-gallon (240,000 L) stormwater retention tank, where water flows during rainstorms or floods. A 19,204-square-foot (1,784.1 m^{2}) park pavilion was also built; the pavilion is made of concrete and has a red facade, with archways and cylindrical protrusions on the roof. There is a roof terrace, as well as educational facilities such as classrooms within the pavilion. The rebuilt park uses material saved from the original design, such as wood and stone, and there are plantings and trails throughout the park. Under the rebuilt park, a floodwall descends to the underlying bedrock.

== Public art ==
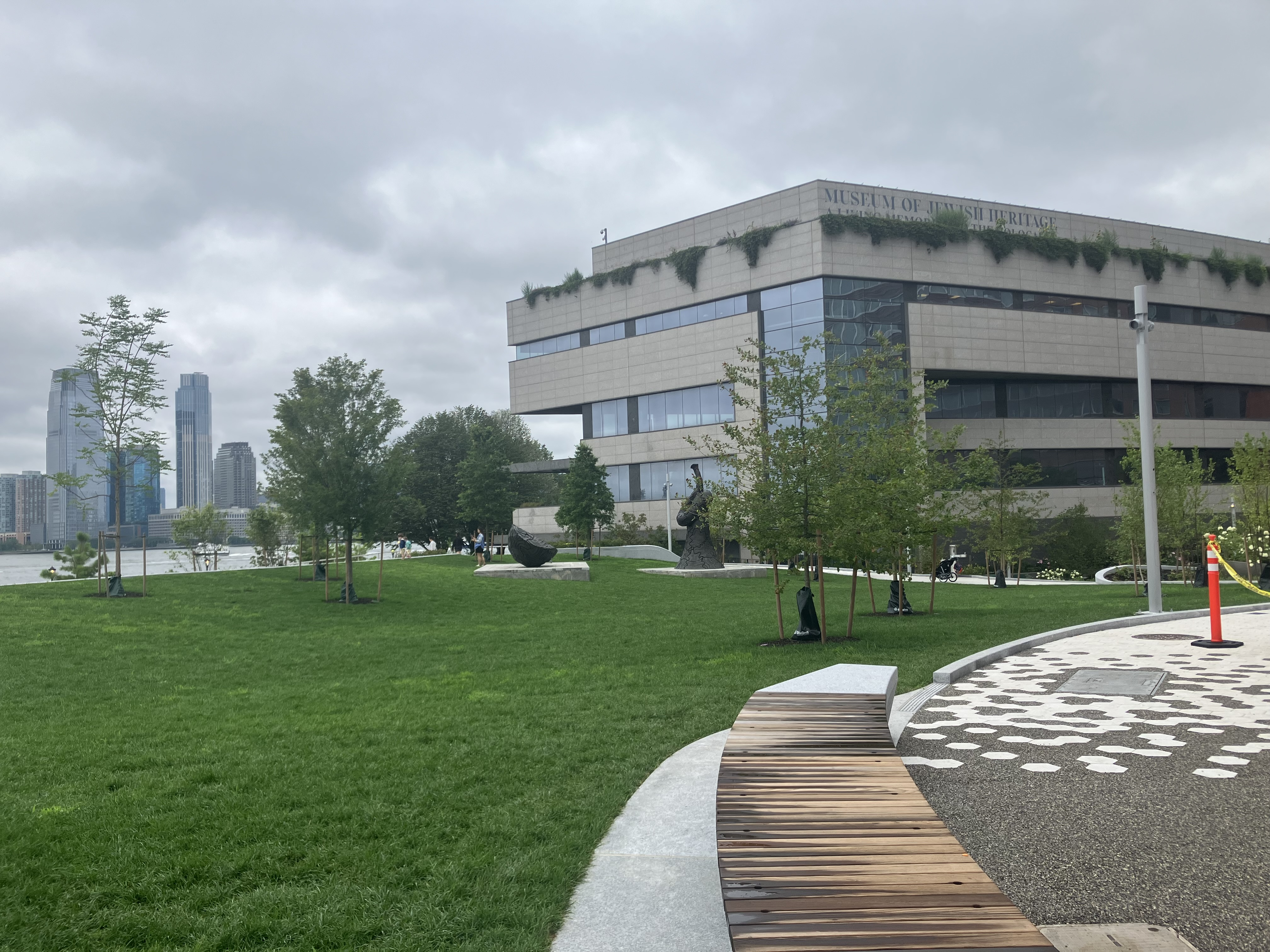
Resonating Bodies in Wagner Park in August 2025, with view towards the Museum of Jewish Heritage.

There are several sculptures located in the park, including:

- Eyes - by Louise Bourgeois
- Resonating Bodies - by Tony Cragg
- Ape & Cat - by Jim Dine
