= City Pier A =

Pier in Manhattan, New York

- U.S. National Register of Historic Places
- New York State Register of Historic Places
- New York City Landmark
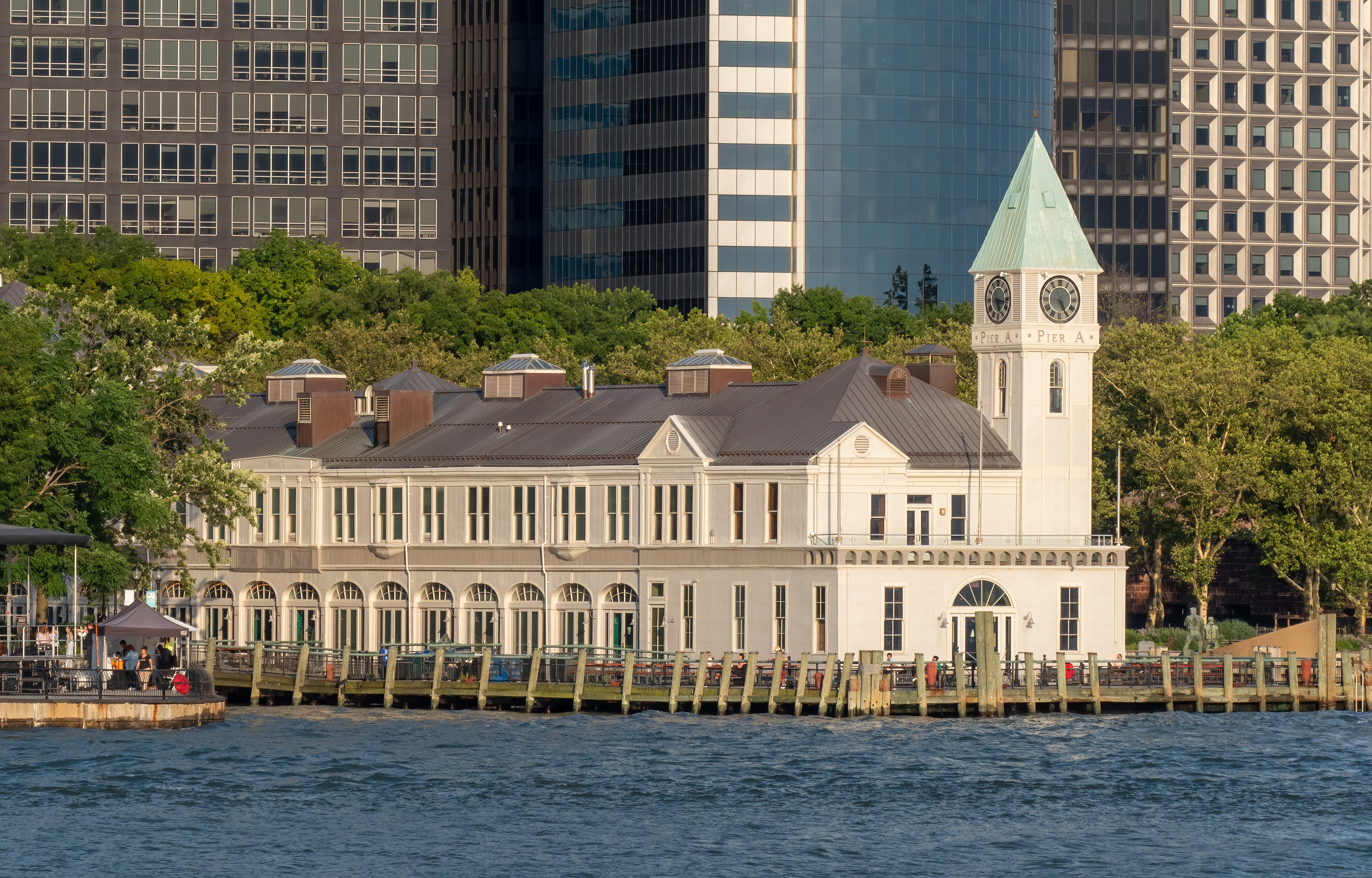
- Location: Battery Place at the Hudson River; Manhattan, New York City
- Coordinates: 40°42′16″N 74°1′6″W
- Built: 1884–86
- Architect: George Sears Greene Jr. (engineer)
- NRHP reference No.: 75001203
- NYSRHP No.: 06101.000064
- NYCL No.: 0918

Significant dates
- Added to NRHP: June 27, 1975
- Designated NYSRHP: June 23, 1980
- Designated NYCL: July 12, 1977

Pier A, also known as City Pier A, is a pier in the Hudson River at Battery Park in Lower Manhattan, New York City. It was built from 1884 to 1886 as the headquarters of the New York City Board of Dock Commissioners (also known as the Docks Department) and the New York City Police Department's (NYPD) Harbor Department. Pier A, the only remaining masonry pier in New York City, contains a two- and three-story structure with a clock tower facing the Hudson River. The pier is a New York City designated landmark and is listed on the National Register of Historic Places (NRHP).

The building atop Pier A was designed by George Sears Greene Jr. The original structure is two stories tall and extends west into the Hudson River; the clock tower at the southwestern corner of the building. The eastern, or inshore, end of Pier A was constructed in 1900 and expanded to three stories in 1904. The pier itself is composed of a concrete deck supported by girders. The building originally housed offices for the NYPD and Docks Department, which were subsequently converted into restaurant spaces.

The Department of Docks started constructing the pier in July 1884; although the pier deck was completed in 1885, the building was not finished until early 1886. The NYPD occupied Pier A until 1955, while the Department of Docks relocated to the Battery Maritime Building in 1959. The New York City Fire Department (FDNY) used the pier from 1960 to 1992 as a fireboat station. Following a failed attempt to demolish Pier A as part of the development of Battery Park City in the 1970s, the structure was added to the NRHP and became a city landmark. Mayor Ed Koch selected Wings Point Associates to redevelop Pier A in 1988, but the redevelopment was stalled for the next two decades. Pier A was temporarily used as a commuter ferry landing after the September 11 attacks. After the Battery Park City Authority leased Pier A in 2008, it was renovated into a restaurant called Harbor House, which operated from 2014 to 2020.

== Site ==
Pier A is on the Hudson River, in the Battery Park City neighborhood of Lower Manhattan in New York City, near the southern end of Manhattan Island. The pier is on the North River, the southernmost portion of the Hudson River, which drains into New York Harbor immediately to the south. It abuts the northern end of Battery Park, just south of the intersection of West Street and Battery Place. Pier A measures 45 ft (14 m) wide by 285 ft (87 m) long. It extends into the river at a 116.5-degree angle (Note: The angle between the pier and the bulkhead to the north is 116.5 degrees.) from the bulkhead along Battery Park's shoreline.

The pier is part of the eponymous Pier A Plaza, which opened to the public in November 2014. Pier A Plaza includes pedestrian space and a bike path. It is part of the Manhattan Waterfront Greenway and connects with Robert F. Wagner Jr. Park to the north. In 1991, the American Merchant Mariners' Memorial was installed on a rebuilt stone breakwater just south of Pier A, connected to it by a dock. Designed by the sculptor Marisol Escobar, the memorial depicts four merchant seamen with their sinking vessel after it had been attacked by a U-boat during World War II. One of the seamen is in the water and is covered by the sea with each high tide.

== Architecture ==
The building atop Pier A is generally two to three stories tall, except for a four-story clock tower at the southwestern corner of the building. The structure is 322 ft (98 m) long, extending onto the Manhattan shoreline to the east. The engineer in charge of construction and design was George Sears Greene Jr., the engineer-in-chief of the New York City Board of Docks from 1875 to 1898 and the son of the civil engineer George S. Greene. Pier A's current design dates to 1919, when the clock was added. It is sometimes nicknamed the "Liberty Gateway" despite never having been a major disembarkation point.

=== Form and facade ===
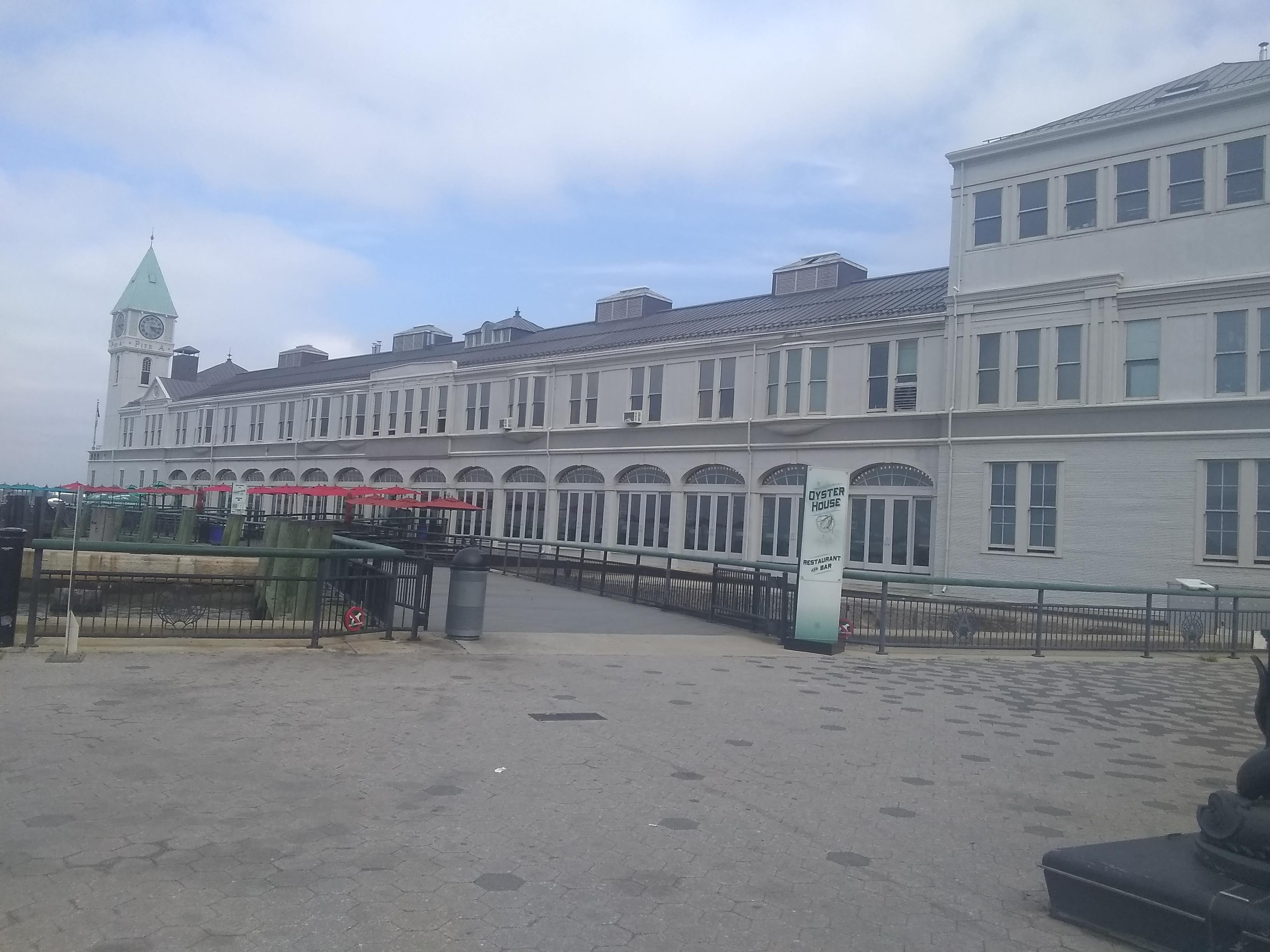
Outshore end of Pier A

The eastern or inshore end of Pier A was constructed in 1900 as a square two-story annex, which was expanded to three stories in 1904. It extends about 50 ft (15 m) inland. The inshore annex's facade is divided vertically into three bays each on its northern, eastern, and southern elevations. The bays are divided by one-story pilasters, and a cornice runs above the third story. The eastern elevation includes a large archway on the ground floor (originally used by horse-drawn carriages), which is flanked by smaller openings with architraves. On the second and third stories of the eastern elevation, there is a triple window in the center bay and a single window on either side. Above the third story, the center bay contains a triangular pediment with seashell decorations, originally decorated with the letter "A". On the northern and southern elevations, the inshore annex has a double window in each bay, as well as a segmentally arched pediment at the center above the third story. The inshore annex is topped by a gable roof.

Just west of Pier A's inshore annex is another three-story section with a flat roof. The central portion of the building is two stories high and extends into the Hudson River. Unlike the inshore annex, the facade of the central section is plain, although it originally included cornices, pilasters, and decorative trim. This section has an arcade of segmental arches on the first story, as well as single, double, and projecting three-sided windows on the second story. The central section is topped by a hip roof, with several monitors protruding from the roof, as well as a gable at the western end. The Battery Park City Authority (BPCA) replaced the copper roof during the early 21st century.

There is a square clock tower at the southwestern corner of Pier A, measuring 70 ft (21 m) tall with a pyramidal roof at its peak. The first and second stories have plain wall surfaces. The third story has arched windows on all four sides, which originally illuminated an observation room, while the fourth story includes four clock faces, one on each side. The observation room was used to monitor maritime traffic in New York Harbor and was removed when the clock was installed in 1919. The clock was taken from a ship and was donated by Daniel G. Reid, founder of United States Steel Corporation. According to a Department of Marine and Aviation spokesperson quoted in The New York Times, it was the first memorial in the United States dedicated to those who died in World War I. Unlike other civil bells, but similarly to simple ship bells, there are eight bells, one for each half-hour of a four-hour watch. At half-hour intervals, the bell is struck between one time (at 12:30, 4:30, and 8:30) and eight times (at 12:00, 4:00, and 8:00).

=== Features ===
==== Structural features ====
Pier A was built with a masonry foundation, unlike similar piers of the time, which were typically built on wooden piles. An earlier masonry pier, East River Pier 1, had been built nearby at Whitehall Street in 1875; the New York City government largely stopped constructing masonry piers after captains complained that the piers caused damage to their ships. Pier A, which was not intended to accommodate large ships, was one of the few masonry piers built after East River Pier 1 was completed. The pier building was constructed with a superstructure of brick, iron, and terracotta. The eastern end of the building was intended to store the Department of Docks' records and was fireproof. Unusual for buildings of the late 19th century, Pier A had its own central heating system, gas lights, and water supply system. The building was covered with several layers of insulation.

The underlying layer of bedrock was as shallow as 10 ft (3.0 m) below mean low water, above which was a layer of soft mud, thus preventing the installation of iron or wooden pilings. As such, the mud above the bedrock was removed when the dock was built, and a timber "crib" was sunken into the water at the site of the dock. This "crib", measuring 15 by 50 ft (4.6 by 15.2 m) across and 5 ft (1.5 m) high; sand and trap rock were used as ballast to sink the crib into the water. Divers then filled the timber crib with concrete bags. Another layer of concrete was poured above these bags and then leveled off, providing a foundation for the rectangular concrete blocks that were placed above these bags. Eight granite sub-piers were then laid above the rectangular concrete blocks to a height of 2 ft (0.61 m) above mean high water. The sub-piers support the deck of the maritime pier, which consist of concrete arches and iron girders. The surface of the deck was covered with a 2 in (5.1 cm) layer of asphalt.

==== Interior ====
Originally, most of the ground floor was a unified space, except for the westernmost 38 ft (12 m) and the easternmost 48 ft (15 m) of the ground story, where a central hallway divided each end into multiple rooms. The New York City Police Department (NYPD) was housed on the northern side of the ground floor, while the New York City Department of Docks was on the southern side. The second story included a 200 ft-long (61 m) hallway flanked by the Dock Department's offices. The NYPD used a 70 by 70 ft (21 by 21 m) watch tower on the southwestern corner of the second floor, and the Department of Docks had a 41 by 36.5 ft (12.5 by 11.1 m) record room at the eastern end.

The building contains an Art Deco-style room that was used as the Docks Commissioner's office. This room is an octagonal space on the second floor with teakwood paneling, and it remained largely intact in the 2010s. When the building was converted into a restaurant in 2014, the first story was remodeled after a German beer hall; there were outdoor dining areas on either side of this beer hall. The second floor became a multi-room restaurant space with a cocktail bar. The restaurant space included a bar measuring 128 ft (39 m) long, as well as a stained-glass chandelier with the letter "A". The third floor became an event space.

== History ==
The New York State Legislature revised the New York City Charter in 1870 to create the New York City Board of Dock Commissioners. The following year, the department published a plan for the development of piers on the city's waterfront, which the state legislature approved. Any subsequent piers had to be approved separately, including Pier A, which was not part of the 1871 plan. The Docks Department initially faced resistance from businesses on the waterfront, which previously had been subjected to little or no city regulation.

=== Docks Department use ===
==== Development and early years ====
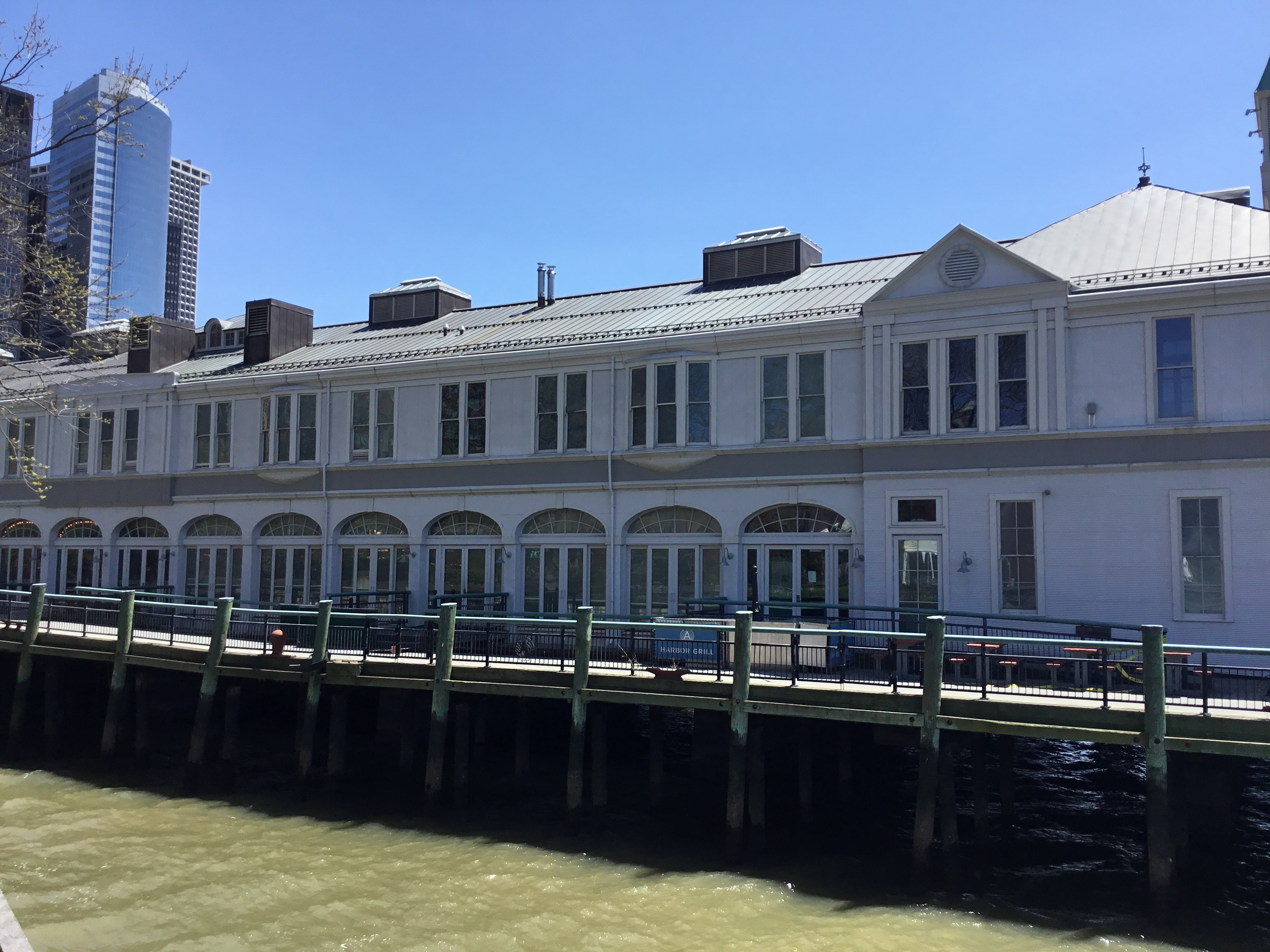
Original section of Pier A, seen from Robert F. Wagner Jr. Park

The New York State Legislature amended the Docks Department's plan in 1884, requiring the Docks Department to develop a pier for the NYPD's Harbor Department. The commissioners selected a site at Battery Park, on the southern tip of Manhattan Island, due to its central location at the northern end of New York Harbor. The commissioners directed the Department of Docks to construct a new pier with offices for the Harbor Department, as well as for the Department of Docks' own headquarters. on July 3, 1884. By relocating its offices, the Department of Docks wished to save $6,500 annually in rent. Construction started immediately under the supervision of George S. Greene Jr. Five of the eight sub-piers were finished by May 1885, and the Department of Docks reported that July that it had completed the deck for $80,000. Work on the building atop Pier A commenced in September 1885. The building cost $40,000 to construct, bringing the project's total cost to $120,000.

The Department of Docks moved into the building on March 20, 1886, and the Harbor Police also moved into the structure. The year after Pier A's opening, the Chicago Daily Tribune reported that maritime crimes in New York Harbor had decreased drastically. The Docks Department used Pier A as an auction house, selling leases for New York City's piers. The CS Mackay-Bennett laid a telegraph cable between Pier A and Coney Island in 1894. Subsequently, the Commercial Cable Company transferred the receiving station for its transatlantic telegraph cable from Coney Island to Pier A, as the receiving station at Coney Island had experienced excessive electrical interference from streetcars. In 1899, the NYPD reestablished (Note: The Steamboat Squad had been disbanded in 1877.) its Steamboat Squad, which patrolled the waters around lower Manhattan and was headquartered at Pier A. To make way for the Steamboat Squad, the Harbor Department relocated its offices to the western end of the building.

==== Expansion and 20th century ====
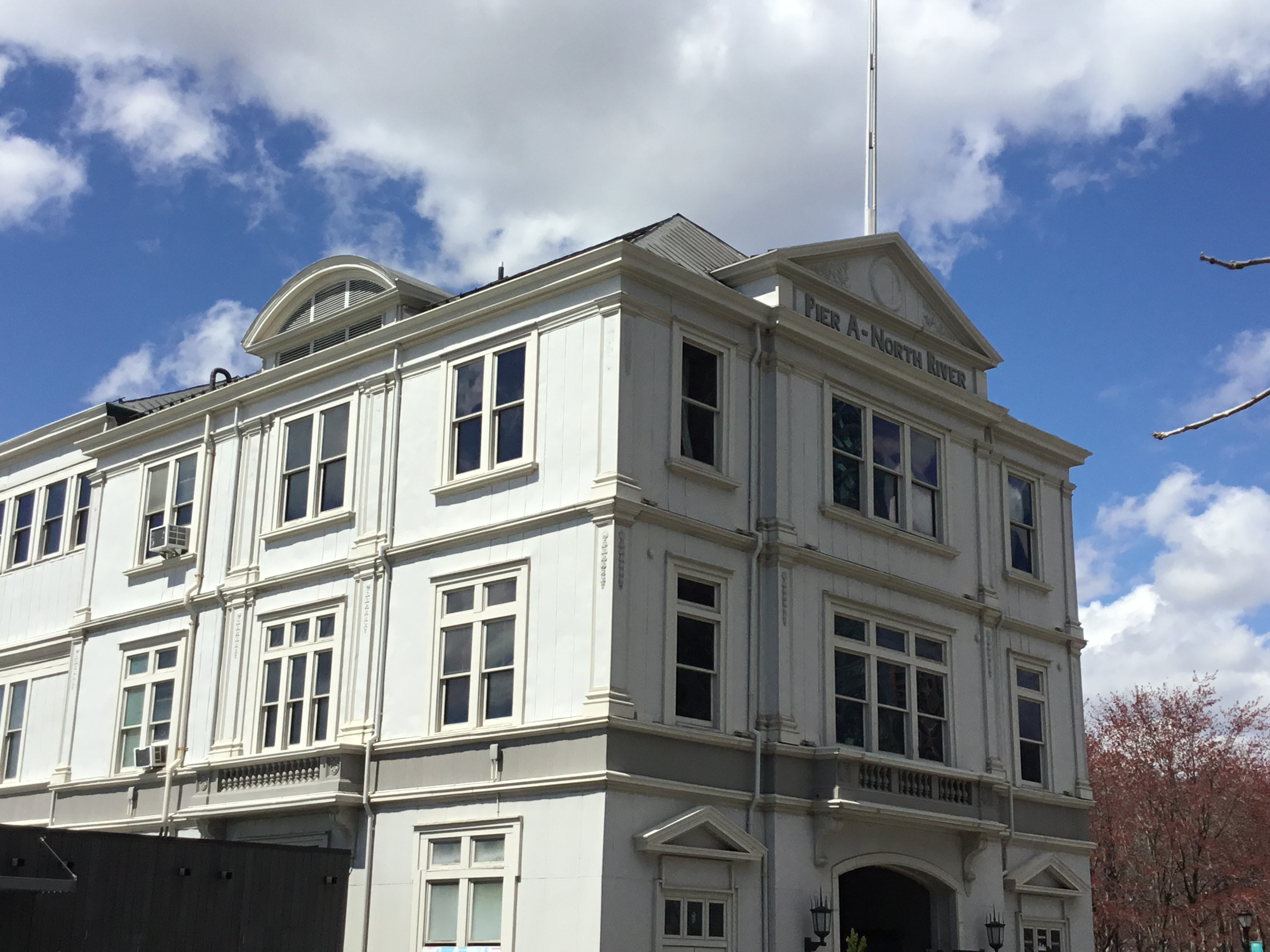
Inshore section, added in 1900 and expanded in 1904

The Department of Docks' engineer-in-chief introduced plans in February 1900 to extend Pier A about 50 ft (15 m) eastward. The first two stories of the eastward annex were constructed at this time, and a third story was built above the eastern annex in 1904. To reduce navigational hazards in the North River, federal government removed a large ledge of rock next to Pier A in 1905; the project took over a year to complete. Pier A was the homeport of the Harbor Department patrol boat Patrol, which traveled around New York Harbor nightly until she was retired in 1916. During World War I, the Harbor Department officers at Pier A were trained to guard against attacks by foreign enemies. After the end of World War I, a clock was installed in the pier's tower as a memorial to 116,000 US servicemen who died during World War I. The clock was unveiled on January 25, 1919, with speeches made by mayor John Francis Hylan and docks commissioner George Murray Hulbert. In 1922, the NYPD abolished the Marine Division and replaced it with the 16th Inspection District, which was headquartered at Pier A. Two years later, the NYPD acquired the speedboat Battery, which was based out of Pier A.

Numerous notable figures sailed to New York City through Pier A during the mid-20th century, including former British prime minister David Lloyd George; aviator Charles Lindbergh; Crown Prince Olav and Princess Martha of Norway; and King George VI and Queen Elizabeth of England. The pier also hosted events, such as a showcase of products from Florida, as well as an exhibition of a U-boat captured during World War II. Docks Department employees dedicated a bronze tablet at Pier A, honoring former docks commissioner Michael Cosgrove, in 1930.

The Department of Docks requested funding from the New York City Council in 1938 to erect a new administration building on Pier A. By 1941, docks commissioner John McKenzie had prepared plans for a new building on the site. The project was part of New York City park commissioner Robert Moses's plan to rebuild Battery Park, which he presented to the New York City Board of Estimate in March 1942. The Pier A building would be replaced with a larger facility that housed the Department of Docks, the NYPD, and a nearby New York City Fire Department (FDNY) station. The City Council allocated funding for the planned new building but delayed its construction until after World War II. The Department of Docks subsequently became the Department of Marine and Aviation. Pier A was not rebuilt after World War II, even as the Department of Marine and Aviation spent $26 million renovating other piers in the city. Instead, by 1952, the Department of Marine and Aviation was planning to relocate to the Battery Maritime Building on the East River, allowing the FDNY and NYPD to consolidate their space at Pier A.

The Department of Marine and Aviation built a 50 by 50 ft (15 by 15 m) heliport at Pier A, which opened on June 11, 1953, as the second heliport operated by the city government. Initially, the heliport was primarily used by the NYPD. In late 1955, the NYPD's Harbor Precinct relocated to Randalls Island. The Department of Marine and Aviation requested $600,000 in 1958 to convert North River piers A and 1 into cargo piers. Eleven hundred employees of the Department of Marine and Aviation relocated from Pier A to the Battery Maritime Building in February 1959. By that time, Pier A only housed the department's executive and administrative staff, while other Marine and Aviation offices were housed in various buildings nearby. The city government planned to turn Pier A over to the FDNY and NYPD.

=== Fireboat station ===
The FDNY used the pier from 1960 to 1992 as a fireboat station. Pier A was the headquarters of Marine Fire Company 1, which used the fireboat John D. McKean. The pier was also used to commission or re-commission FDNY fireboats, including the John Purroy Mitchel, the Governor Alfred E. Smith, and the John H. Glenn Jr.. Marine Fire Company 8, which used the Governor Alfred A. Smith, also docked at Pier A until 1970, when Marine Co. 8 was disbanded. Most of the decorations on the facade were covered by corrugated iron panels as part of a 1964 renovation. FDNY commissioner Edward Thompson said at the time: "Instead of an eyesore, it will be a fond sight for the people passing through the harbor."

By 1966, the New York City Planning Commission sought to preserve piers A and 1, as they were part of the "New York cultural milieu". In 1969, the Battery Park City Authority (BPCA) acquired Pier A as part of its development of the Battery Park City neighborhood, with plans to raze the structure. The first phase of the Battery Park City project, which started in 1971, was to comprise 16 acres (6.5 ha) from Pier A north to Rector Street. The nonprofit New York Landmarks Conservancy wanted the pier to be saved, and New York City's ports commissioner Edgar C. Fabber and the FDNY's marine division also supported the pier's preservation. Mario Biaggi, a candidate in the 1973 New York City mayoral election, advocated for Pier A to be protected "as a landmark of beauty and historical significance and as a permanent memorial to American soldiers".

The federal government added Pier A to the National Register of Historic Places (NRHP) in mid-1975. The NRHP designation allowed city and state agencies to receive matching funds from the federal government to pay for Pier A's renovation. The next year, the New York State Department of Parks, Recreation and Historic Preservation and the United States Department of the Interior each provided $90,000 for renovations to the building's foundation, mechanical and electrical systems, and architectural details. By then, Pier A was the oldest pier operating in New York City. The New York Times wrote: "The plan to rehabilitate the pier is something of a financial anomaly, owing in significant measure to the city’s money problems." The New York City Landmarks Preservation Commission designated Pier A as a New York City landmark on July 12, 1977. After winning the 1977 New York City mayoral election, Ed Koch intended to restore structures on New York Harbor, starting with Pier A. Koch announced in 1980 that the city government would open a request for proposals for the redevelopment of Pier A. However, the plans did not proceed for several years.

=== Redevelopment ===
==== Initial proposals ====
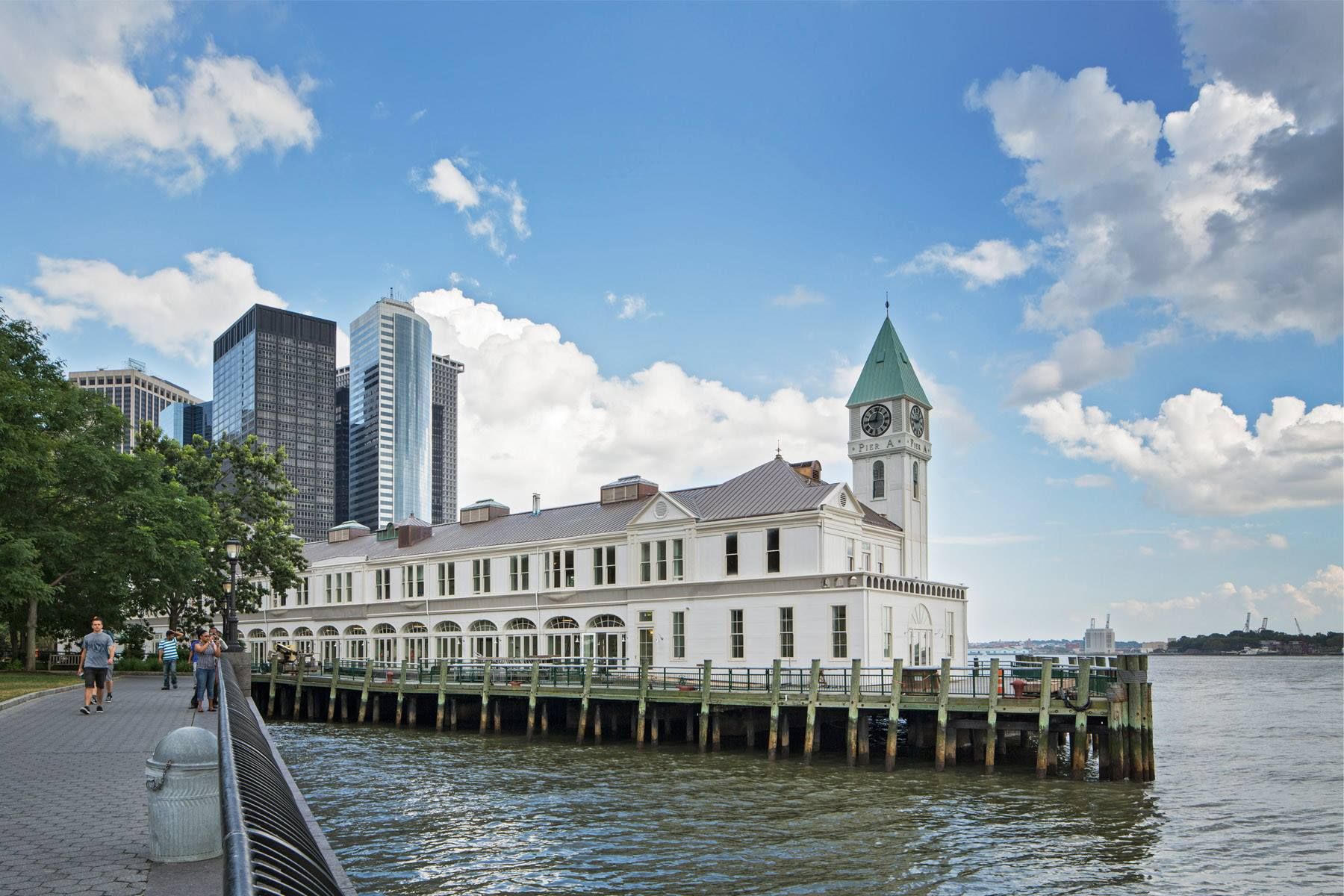
Pier A as seen from directly to the north

By 1987, the Koch administration was considering converting Pier A into a visitor center as part of the planned Harbor Park, a complex of parks around New York Harbor. That December, the Koch administration proposed relocating the headquarters of the FDNY's Marine Division, a repair shop, and several other offices while keeping Marine Company 1 at Pier A. City officials planned a visitor center on the ground level and restaurants on the upper stories. The city opened a request for proposals for Pier A's redevelopment in January 1988, receiving four bids. Later that year, the city selected Wings Point Associates as the site developer. Another bidder, the Abbracciamento Group, had put forth a more profitable proposal; however, the city rejected the plan because Abbracciamento had wanted to buy a boat and relocate the restaurant there. The other two bidders were Pier A Development Group, which had proposed an upscale restaurant and a fast-food restaurant, and Municipal Quality Partners, which had proposed an upscale restaurant, bookstore, and food bank.

Wings Point signed a 50-year lease on the building and planned to spend $20 million on rehabilitation. The next year, the New York state government gave the city government $4 million for the project. Robert Silman & Associates was hired as the structural engineer for the renovation, while Beyer Blinder Belle was the renovation architect. The FDNY relocated John D. McKean from Pier A at the end of 1991. To facilitate Pier A's redevelopment, in mid-1991, U.S. representative Ted Weiss proposed that the waters around Pier A be declared non-navigable. Because the federal government could easily condemn a structure in navigable waters, it was difficult to obtain financing for such structures, including Pier A. Simultaneously, the city was planning to construct Hudson River Park along the riverfront, connecting Pier A with the new Battery Park City neighborhood.

By early 1993, the developers planned to begin renovating Pier A later that year. However, work remained stalled for several years because of a lack of funds and Wings Point's refusal to accept chain stores as tenants. Work started in June 1997 after the New York City Industrial Development Agency issued $8 million worth of bonds; by then, the cost had risen to $27 million. As late as April 1999, Pier A was planned to open by the end of that year. A replica of the slave ship La Amistad was temporarily docked at Pier A in July 2000, but the pier was otherwise unused and decrepit during the early 2000s, except for its clock tower.

==== Ferry dock plans ====
After the September 11 attacks in 2001 caused severe disruptions to the city's transportation system, the city and state governments built a temporary dock for commuter ferries at Pier A, constructing six slips within six weeks of the attack to address passenger crowding issues at Pier 11. The city and state governments allowed NY Waterway to operate ferries there. New York Water Taxi started serving Pier A in late 2002, as part of an expansion of ferry service in New York City after the September 11 attacks. The temporary ferry terminal closed in December 2003, after ferry ridership had decreased following the reopening of the World Trade Center PATH station.

New York governor George Pataki announced in January 2003 that the Battery Park City Authority (BPCA) would buy out Pier A to speed up the redevelopment process. At the time, the National Park Service (NPS), which conducted security screenings of Liberty Island and Ellis Island visitors at the nearby Castle Clinton, wished to relocate its security-screening facility to Pier A. The same year, Wings Point sued NY Waterway because the latter company had not paid landing fees to use Pier A.

William B. Wachtel of Wings Point formed the BillyBey Ferry Company in early 2005 to take over NY Waterway's Lower Manhattan operations, and he tentatively planned to launch New York Harbor sightseeing cruises from Pier A. NY Waterway had planned to start operating sightseeing cruises from Pier A in April 2006, but the EDC did not allow NY Waterway to use the pier. Arnie Geller presented a competing plan to open an RMS Titanic museum at Pier A, and the BPCA also wanted to acquire the pier. The NPS was still planning to relocate its security-screening facilities to Pier A, but the plan was delayed because of disputes between the EDC and Wings Point. The city government entered a tentative agreement with the NPS in April 2007 and, a few months later, acquired Wings Point's lease for $8 million.

The BPCA leased the pier from the city for 49 years in May 2008, paying a nominal fee of $1 a year. The BPCA hoped to convert Pier A into a transportation hub and negotiated with the NPS to relocate its security-screening facilities to Pier A. The NPS reneged from this plan in 2009, expressing concerns over the cost and timeline of Pier A's renovation. The BPCA made several modifications to Pier A between 2008 and 2013, including repairing the masonry foundations, replacing the roof, and installing modern electrical and plumbing systems.

==== Harbor House ====
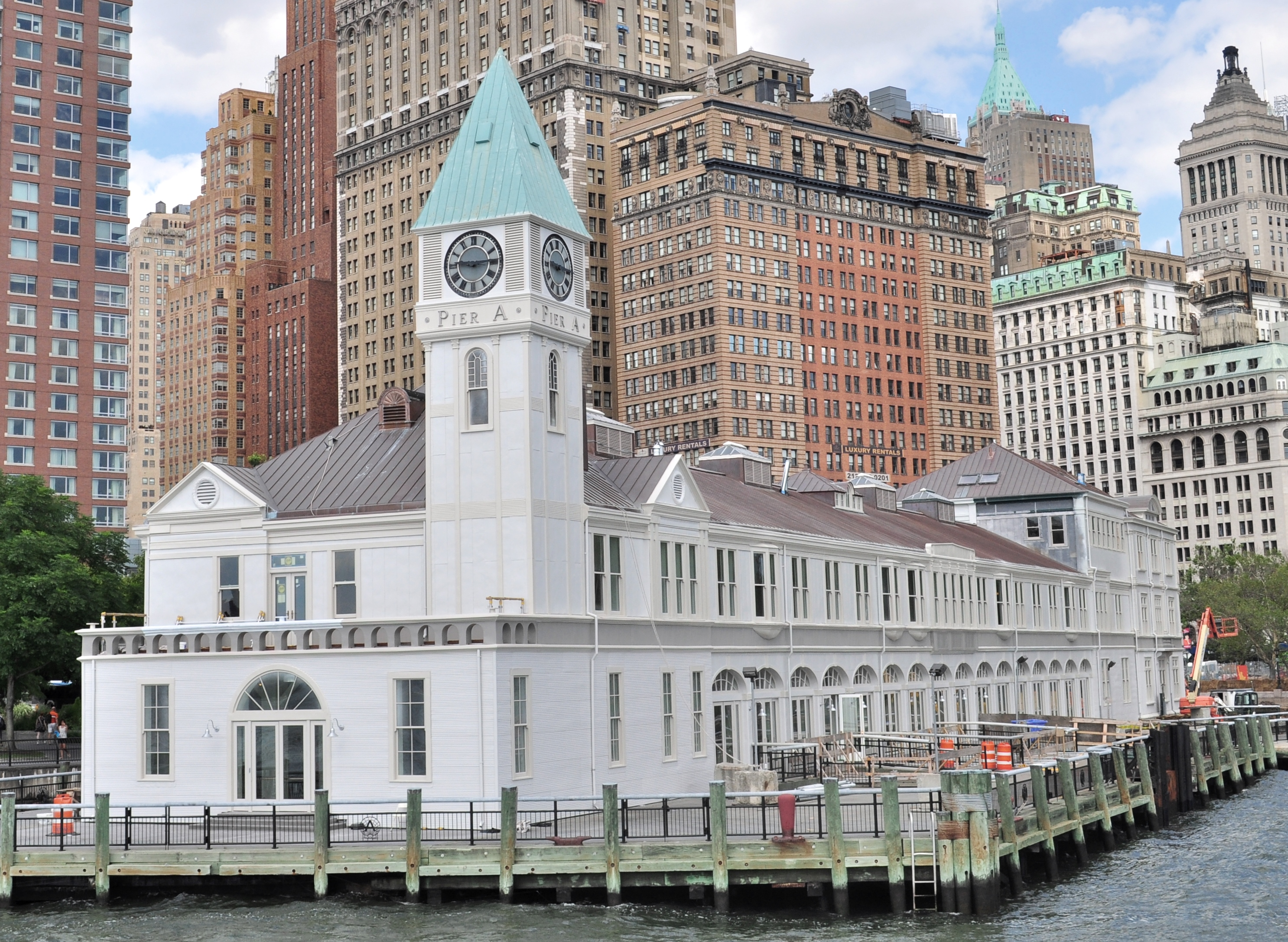
View of Pier A from the Hudson River

After the NPS withdrew from its plan to lease Pier A, four bidders submitted proposals to the BPCA for a renovation of the structure. The bidders included Peter Poulakakos, who wished to convert the pier into a restaurant, and Joseph J. Grano Jr., who proposed an Italian heritage museum at the pier. The BPCA voted in March 2011 to lease the pier to Poulakakos for 25 years, prompting community members to complain that the BPCA had not consulted them about the plans beforehand. Poulakakos said his father had been interested in the structure since the 1970s. Poulakakos and his partners would pay $41 million over the duration of their lease. Under the terms of the lease, if the restaurant's gross revenue exceeded $18 million, the BPCA would share eight percent of any gross revenue above that amount. By that time, Pier A was abandoned and decrepit. Poulakakos hoped to open the restaurant by late 2012, and he started renovating the building in partnership with the Dermot Company.

The $20 million renovation was delayed by several months after Hurricane Sandy flooded Pier A in late 2012, causing $4.3 million in damage. In the hurricane's aftermath, the architects relocated the mechanical equipment to the second floor, and they installed water-resistant mahogany and removable furniture on the first floor. The architects also added maritime-themed decorations to the building. The BPCA transferred control of Pier A to Poulakakos in mid-2013, although the agency was still responsible for constructing a plaza outside the building, work on which had been delayed by a lack of funding. The New York City government allocated $5 million for the plaza's development. The renovation ultimately cost about $40 million. The city government spent $30 million on the restoration of Pier A, while the Battery Park Authority spent $7 million on Pier A and $5 million on the plaza. Pier A Harbor House opened to the public in November 2014, more than three decades after the redevelopment project had started. The ground-floor space opened first, followed by the upper-floor spaces. The Blacktail Bar, a Cuban bar on Pier A's second story, opened in August 2016 and operated until January 2020.

Harbor House closed in March 2020 due to the COVID-19 pandemic in the United States. The BPCA sought to reopen Harbor House, but the restaurant ultimately never opened again, even as Poulakakos continued to operate other restaurants in New York City. A group of investors with EB-5 visas, who had provided $16.5 million for Pier A's renovation, sued Poulakako to recoup their investment. Although the BPCA was willing to terminate Harbor House's 25-year lease ahead of schedule, the EB-5 investors were uninterested in taking over the pier. By 2021, there were several proposals to reopen Pier A. Statue Cruises, which operated ferries to Liberty and Ellis islands, proposed relocating its ferry dock to Pier A, as Statue Cruises' existing dock at Castle Clinton was deteriorating. As part of the Lower Manhattan Coastal Resiliency Project, in 2022, the BPCA proposed converting Pier A Plaza into a two-story park to protect the surrounding neighborhood from rising sea levels. Pier A Plaza was to contain retractable flood barriers on its upper level, as well as wooden benches, trees, and brick structures that could withstand prolonged flooding. The Battery Park City Authority sued the operators of Pier A's restaurants in early 2023 for $8 million. Pier A remained vacant in 2026.

== See also ==
- List of New York City Designated Landmarks in Manhattan below 14th Street
- National Register of Historic Places listings in Manhattan below 14th Street
