= Bowdoin College Museum of Art =

Art museum in Brunswick, Maine

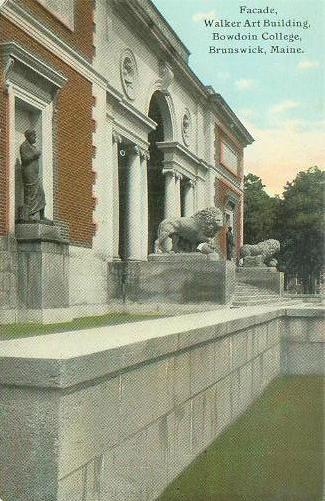
- Walker Art Building
- Established: 1894
- Location: Brunswick, Maine
- Coordinates: 43°54′30″N 69°57′49″W
- Type: Art Museum
- Directors: Anne C. Goodyear, Frank H. Goodyear
- Architect: McKim, Mead, and White
- Owner: Bowdoin College
- Website: www.bowdoin.edu/art-museum

The Bowdoin College Museum of Art is an art museum located in Brunswick, Maine. The museum is a part of Bowdoin College and has been located in the Walker Art Building since 1894. The museum is historically strong in classical art. Admission to the museum is free for all visitors.

== History ==
The museum's collection originated from separate donations of art from James Bowdoin III in 1811 and 1826. Having been housed in a number of different locations during its history, the museum found a permanent home in the Walker Art Building in 1894.

Commissioned in 1891 and completed in 1894, this Renaissance Revival building was designed by Charles Follen McKim and commissioned by Mary Sophia Walker (1839–1904) and Harriet Sarah Walker (1844–1898) in memory of their uncle, Theophilus Wheeler Walker (1813–1890), who supported the creation of the first small art gallery at Bowdoin in the mid-nineteenth century. The Walker sisters also donated a collection of art and antiquities, including Greek and Roman ceramics and glass purchased with the aid of Edward Perry Warren. The lunettes of the building's domed rotunda features four murals representing antiquity: Rome by Elihu Vedder, Venice by Kenyon Cox, Athens by John La Farge, and Florence by Abbott Thayer. The building also contains a large bronze tablet portrait of Theophilus Wheeler Walker by Daniel Chester French. At the entrance are a pair of Medici lions copied from those in Loggia dei Lanzi, Florence.

While the Walker Art Building had been renovated once in 1974, the $20.8 million renovation by architects Machado and Silvetti Associates of Boston that finished in 2007 garnered praise for its creation of a new modern entrance to the museum while preserving the structural integrity of the original building. The new entrance features a glass and bronze pavilion, a floating steel staircase, and a glass curtain wall to display Assyrian reliefs, along with an additional 2,000 square feet of gallery space. In 2008, the renovation received the American Architecture Award alongside other awards from the Boston Society of Architects, the Illuminating Engineering Society, the American Institute of Architects New England, and the Maine Preservation Society.

== Collections ==
The museum's permanent collection comprises more than 30,000 objects and is especially strong in antiquities and works on paper. It holds more than 1,800 Assyrian, Egyptian, Greek, Roman, Byzantine, and Chinese objects. According to the museum's website, this "constitutes one of the most comprehensive compilations of ancient art in any academic museum." The museum's extensive European art holdings include about 700 Dutch and Flemish artworks dating from 1500 to 1800, along with American, Asian, global, and contemporary art. The museum seeks balance by acquiring works by artists who are female, indigenous, people of color, or from underrepresented regions such as Latin America. Visitors can search the entire collection online, and the majority of the objects have been digitized.
