= Machado and Silvetti Associates =

Architecture and urban design firm

Machado Silvetti is an architecture architecture and urban design firm headquartered in Boston, Massachusetts. Incorporated in 1985, the firm has been widely recognized as one of the most influential architectural practices in contemporary design, known for its distinctive approach to adaptive reuse, museum design, and contextual architecture.

== History and Founding ==
The firm's co-founders, Rodolfo Machado and Jorge Silvetti, began their professional association in 1974 and formally established Machado and Silvetti Associates in 1985. The office has been called "arguably Boston's most influential firm of the last generation."

Machado and Silvetti's approach to architecture emphasizes "conceptual clarity and visual intensity," with an unwavering commitment to understanding and enhancing the unique character of each project's context. Their work has been characterized as merging contemporary design agendas with complex cultural and historic contexts, demonstrating that "construction as an art, and not as a mere technical instrument, is verifiable in each of their built projects."

== Leadership Transition ==
In 2015, Jeffry Burchard, AIA and Stephanie Randazzo Dwyer, AIA were named Principals, becoming integral leaders in the firm's continued growth and innovation. In 2025, Rodolfo Machado and Jorge Silvetti transitioned to Principal Emeriti status, retiring from active practice. The firm continues under the leadership and ownership of Randazzo Dwyer and Burchard, maintaining the Machado Silvetti name and commitment to design excellence.

=== Current Leadership ===
Stephanie Randazzo Dwyer and Jeffry Burchard now serve as the firm's Design Principals and Partners. According to Burchard, "We're maintaining the name Machado Silvetti, because that represents the office that we are and that we want to be. It has a really incredible legacy of not only touching a lot of architects and a lot of communities, but about creating buildings that are really reflections of the communities that they're in, or the institutions that they're for, or the people that they serve."

Randazzo Dwyer's practice focuses on the transition from site-specific research to architectural construction, while Burchard emphasizes experiential elements in design. Both maintain roles in architectural education and professional practice. The firm continues an association with design schools in the Boston area, including the Harvard Graduate School of Design, the Massachusetts Institute of Technology, and the Rhode Island School of Design.

== Design Philosophy ==
Machado Silvetti is committed to a research-based design approach that explores and celebrates each project's unique character through original conceptual frameworks and visual intensity. The firm has established itself as a forerunner in adaptive reuse and building in historic contexts, with a robust portfolio spanning museums, educational, and cultural institutions.

The firm's work across differing scales and locations—including projects in Boston and New England, as well as commissions in New York, Los Angeles, Denver, and internationally in locations such as Beirut, Buenos Aires, Abu Dhabi, Malaysia, and Vietnam—demonstrates commitment to place-based design.

== Notable Projects ==
Machado Silvetti's body of work includes numerous landmark projects that have shaped contemporary architectural discourse:

=== Museums and Cultural Institutions ===
- Bowdoin College Museum of Art – Brunswick, Maine. A sophisticated renovation and expansion that received the 2008 American Architecture Award.
- Provincetown Art Association and Museum – Provincetown, Massachusetts. A celebrated renovation and addition completed in 2006, recipient of the 2007 American Architecture Award.
- Denver Art Museum – Denver, Colorado. An extensive renovation and expansion project that includes the new Sie Welcome Center addition, paying homage to Gio Ponti's iconic architecture. The project received the Boston Society for Architecture Honor Award, Denver Mayor's Design Award, AIA Colorado Awards, and Interior Design Magazine's 2022 Best of Year Award for Museums.
- The Getty Villa – Los Angeles, California. The firm's work on this complex restoration was praised as "a near miracle—a museum that elicits no smirks from the art world.... a masterful job... crafting a sophisticated ensemble of buildings, plazas, and landscaping."
- Mint Museum – Charlotte, North Carolina. A notable contemporary art museum expansion.
- Utah Museum of Fine Arts – Salt Lake City, Utah. A significant educational and cultural facility.
- Chao Center for Asian Art at the Ringling Museum of Art – Sarasota, Florida.
- New Bedford Whaling Museum – New Bedford, Massachusetts. The firm developed a comprehensive master plan for the world's largest whaling museum and is currently executing the first phase: a new temporary exhibitions and gallery building.

=== Educational Institutions ===
- Sam M. Walton College of Business – University of Arkansas. A major educational facility completed for one of the nation's leading business schools.
- NYU Global Center for Academic and Spiritual Life – New York, New York. A significant institutional hub designed by the firm.
- Horace Mann School – Riverdale, New York. Recent renovation and expansion project.
- UNT College of Visual Arts and Design – Denton, Texas. A contemporary educational environment. One Western Avenue – Harvard University, Cambridge, Massachusetts. A prominent academic facility.

=== Libraries and Public Spaces ===
- Honan-Allston Branch, Boston Public Library – Boston, Massachusetts. A renowned public library renovation and expansion that received the 2003 Harleston Parker Medal.
- Downtown Cary Park – Cary, North Carolina. A contemporary public plaza featuring pavilions and civic space, which won Fast Company's 2025 Innovation by Design Award in the Urban Design category for balancing everyday life, environmental resilience, and catalytic economic planning.

=== Historic Preservation ===
- Stone Barns Center for Food & Agriculture - Pocantico Hills, New York. A group of Norman-style barns built in the early 1930s by John D. Rockefeller, Jr., the Stone Barns Center for Food and Agriculture anchors a complex that includes a non-profit farm, a nature preserve, and the farm-to-table restaurant Blue Hill. It was developed by David Rockefeller, Sr., his daughter Peggy Dulany, and D.R. Horne & Company. Stone-informed material choices appear throughout the project: white oak stained to match the original chestnut, stained concrete, and slate. Light, transparent interventions within the stone walls feature simple, minimal detailing, in order to preserve the massive appearance of the original material.
- Menokin: The Glass House Project – Warsaw, Virginia. An innovative historic preservation initiative by the Menokin Foundation that replaces missing walls, floors, and roof sections with glass, protecting the 1769 house's remaining elements through a transformative intervention.

== Recognition and Awards ==
Machado Silvetti has received numerous prestigious awards and accolades for design excellence:

=== Major Awards ===
- 2026 AIA National Award for Regional & Urban Design - Downtown Cary Park
- 2026 AIA National Award for Small Project - The Bark Bar at Downtown Cary Park
- 2025 Fast Company Innovation by Design Award – Urban Design category, for Downtown Cary Park
- 2025 American Architecture Award (recent wins)
- 2008 American Architecture Award – Bowdoin College Museum of Art
- 2007 American Architecture Award – Provincetown Art Association and Museum
- 2006 Los Angeles Business Council Best Civic Architecture Award – Getty Villa
- 2003 Harleston Parker Medal – Honan-Allston Library, Boston Public Library
- 2003 AIA National Honor Award for Architecture – Honan-Allston Library
- Denver Mayor's Design Award – Denver Art Museum
- Boston Society of Architects Honor Award for Design Excellence – Denver Art Museum Martin Building Expansion
- AIA Colorado Awards – Denver Art Museum
- Interior Design Magazine's 2022 Best of Year Award – Museums category, Denver Art Museum
- 2002 Boston Society of Architects Honor Award
- 2002 AIA New England Honor Award
- 2002 Boston Society of Architects Design Excellence in Housing Award
- 1991 First Award in Architecture – American Academy and Institute of Arts and Letters
- 9th International Award for Architecture in Stone – 2005

== Educational Engagement ==
Both Rodolfo Machado and Jorge Silvetti have maintained significant roles in architectural education throughout their careers, with positions at Harvard University's Graduate School of Design. This commitment to education has continued under the new leadership, with Burchard teaching professional practice at Harvard's Graduate School of Design and Randazzo Dwyer actively engaged in teaching and mentoring at leading design schools.

== Current and Recent Work ==
As of 2025, the firm continues an active portfolio of diverse projects including ongoing work with major cultural institutions, continued phases of the New Bedford Whaling Museum master plan, educational facilities, and civic design initiatives. The firm's current work emphasizes innovation in sustainable design, contextual sensitivity, and collaborative community-centered approaches.

== Office Location ==
The firm maintains its headquarters in Boston, Massachusetts, on Harrison Avenue, a location that has facilitated close collaboration with Boston-area design schools and institutions for over four decades.
