= Two Roads =

British publishing company

- Parent company: Hodder & Stoughton
- Status: Active
- Founded: 2010
- Country of origin: United Kingdom
- Headquarters location: London, England
- Official website: http://www.tworoadsbooks.com

Two Roads Books is an imprint of John Murray Press now a division of Hachette.

== History ==
Announced by its Publisher, Lisa Highton, in September 2010, Two Roads started publishing in 2011. Publishing 12-15 books a year, with a mixture of narrative non-fiction and fiction, its stated mission is ‘stories-voices-places-lives’. Two Roads is now an imprint of John Murray Press, and was shortlisted for Imprint of the Year in the British Book Awards 2019. Two Roads authors include Sir David Attenborough, Billy Connolly, Kirsty Wark, Akala, Monty Don and Ruth Hogan.

== Notable publications ==
2011

- Ape House – Sara Gruen
- Water For Elephants – Sara Gruen
- The Vet: my wild & wonderful friends – Luke Gamble
- Farangi Girl – Ashley Dartnell
- Signs of life – Natalie Taylor
- The Puppy Diaries – Jill Abramson

2012

- The Sea on Our Skin – Madeleine Tobert
- A Century of Wisdom – Caroline Stoessinger
- The Reading Promise – Alice Ozma
- Cleo – Helen Brown
- Cats & Daughters – Helen Brown
- The Last Lecture – Randy Pausch
- The Vet: The big wild world – Luke Gamble
- Dream New Dreams – Jai Pausch
- The Stockholm Octavo – Karen Englemann
- The End of Your Life Book Club – Will Schwalbe
- Happier at Home – Gretchen Rubin

2013

- Doodlemum – Angie Stevens
- Island Wife – Judy Fairbairns
- Z: A Novel of Zelda Fitzgerald – Therese Anne Fowler
- Before I Say Goodbye – Susan Spencer-Wendel

2019

- The Corner Shop – Babita Sharma
