= Water for Elephants (film) =

2011 film by Francis Lawrence

- Theatrical release poster
- Directed by: Francis Lawrence
- Screenplay by: Richard LaGravenese
- Based on: Water for Elephants by Sara Gruen
- Produced by: Gil Netter; Erwin Stoff; Andrew R. Tennenbaum
- Starring: Reese Witherspoon; Robert Pattinson; Christoph Waltz; Hal Holbrook
- Cinematography: Rodrigo Prieto
- Edited by: Alan Edward Bell
- Music by: James Newton Howard
- Production companies: Fox 2000 Pictures; 3 Arts Entertainment; Gil Netter Productions; Flashpoint Entertainment; Dune Entertainment; Ingenious Media; Big Screen Productions
- Distributed by: 20th Century Fox
- Release date: April 22, 2011
- Running time: 120 minutes
- Country: United States
- Languages: English; Polish
- Budget: $38 million
- Box office: $117.1 million

Water for Elephants is a 2011 American period romantic drama film directed by Francis Lawrence and written by Richard LaGravenese, based on the 2006 novel by Sara Gruen. The film stars Reese Witherspoon, Robert Pattinson, Christoph Waltz, and Hal Holbrook.

The film was released in the United States on April 22, 2011. It received mixed reviews from film critics and grossed $117 million worldwide on a budget of $38 million.

== Plot ==
Circus owner Charlie O'Brien encounters an elderly man named Jacob Jankowski, who is separated from his nursing home group. Jacob reveals he once had a career in the circus business and was present during one of the most infamous circus disasters of all time.

In 1931, when Jacob is a 23-year-old veterinary medicine student taking his final exam at Cornell University, he learns that his parents were killed in a car accident. After the bank forecloses on the family home and in the midst of the Great Depression, he jumps onto a passing circus train.

Jacob meets Camel, an employee with the Benzini Bros., who agrees to help him obtain a job. He meets ringmaster August, who after learning of Jacob's veterinary background, hires him to care for the animals. Jacob meets August's wife, performer Marlena Rosenbluth, and informs her that their star show horse has laminitis.

August instructs Jacob to keep the horse performing as long as possible, but Jacob takes it upon himself to euthanize it. A furious August threatens to throw him off the moving train to scare him into submission, but later expresses gratitude to Jacob for potentially saving Marlena from being injured by the sick horse.

August soon procures Rosie, an Asian elephant, and assigns Jacob to train her. He invites Jacob to dinner with him and Marlena, where he observes August's possessive treatment of his wife. After August passes out from drunkenness, Jacob and Marlena share a dance and nearly kiss.

Jacob attempts but fails to train Rosie, and August beats her with a bullhook when she fails to follow orders. After the elephant runs off and nearly injures Marlena during a show, August savagely beats her. Jacob, with help from Marlena, Camel, and his roommate Walter, cleans her wounds and gives her buckets of whisky to numb her pain.

They unexpectedly discover that Rosie understands Polish commands. She begins to perform beautifully and the circus enjoys a short period of success.

Jacob and Marlena grow closer, and after escaping a prohibition raid at a restaurant, they kiss. Marlena expresses regret, while Jacob considers quitting but cannot bear to leave Rosie with August.

When August later observes their chemistry, he abuses Marlena and cruelly taunts them. She discovers that he plans to throw Jacob off the train, so they run away together, hiding in a local hotel. They have sex but are ambushed by August's henchmen who drag Marlena away and beat up Jacob.

Jacob covertly returns to the circus train, finds Marlena, and nearly kills August with a knife while he sleeps. Marlena tells Jacob that Camel and Walter were thrown from the train and killed and that several circus employees have become fed up with August's murderous cruelty and betrayal.

The following day, they unlock all of the animal cages while an audience watches Marlena and Rosie's performance. Jacob attempts to find Marlena in the chaos, but August attacks him. Marlena tries to save Jacob from being beaten by August, causing the latter to turn his fury on her.

August strangles Marlena while Jacob fights with August's lead henchman. Two circus employees save Jacob, and Rosie hits August on the back of the head with an iron stake, killing him and rescuing Marlena. The Benzini Bros. circus is officially shut down, and no one is charged with releasing the animals.

Back in the present, Jacob explains to O'Brien that he and Marlena took Rosie and got jobs with the Ringling Bros. and Barnum & Bailey Circus. He finished his degree and worked as a circus veterinarian while Marlena continued to perform with Rosie. They purchased a farm, married, had 5 children, and kept Rosie until her death.

Jacob took on a job as a vet at the Albany Zoo, and after many happy years together, Marlena died peacefully. Not wanting to return to the lonely nursing home, Jacob asks for a job with the circus as a ticket taker, and O'Brien agrees.

== Cast ==
- Reese Witherspoon as Marlena Rosenbluth
- Robert Pattinson as Jacob Jankowski

- Hal Holbrook as Older Jacob Jankowski

- Christoph Waltz as August Rosenbluth
- Tai as Rosie, The Elephant
- James Frain as Rosie's Caretaker
- Paul Schneider as Charlie O'Brien
- Ken Foree as Earl
- Tim Guinee as Joe "Diamond Joe"
- Mark Povinelli as Kinko / Walter
- Scott MacDonald as Blackie
- Jim Norton as Camel
- Richard Brake as Grady
- Sam Anderson as Mr. Hyde
- John Aylward as Mr. Ervin
- Brad Greenquist as Mr. Robinson
- Uggie as Queenie, The Terrier

== Production ==
=== Filming ===
On a budget of $38 million, filming began on May 20, 2010, in Los Angeles, Piru, Fillmore in California, Chattanooga, Tennessee, Kensington and Chickamauga in Georgia. The filming wrapped up on August 4, 2010. This is the second time Witherspoon and Pattinson have co-starred together as they had filmed a deleted scene from 2004's Vanity Fair in which he was her estranged son. Reshoots for the film were scheduled for mid-January 2011.

The stampede scenes were digitally composed.

Several transportation scenes were filmed at the Fillmore and Western Railway. The locomotive used for the circus train scenes in the film was McCloud Railway 18, which now operates excursion trains on the Virginia and Truckee Railroad.

=== Alleged animal abuse ===
In the film, the elephant Rosie is severely abused. A spokesperson from the AHA stated that all scenes of abuse in the film were the work of special effects and CGI and that the moaning and crying sounds that Rosie makes in film were audio tracks, and were not actually made by Tai.

Controversy erupted, however, regarding concerns Tai was mistreated prior to filming. A video released by the Animal Defenders International (ADI) in 2011 shows footage from 2005 of Tai allegedly being shocked with handheld stun guns and beaten around the body and legs with bullhooks, while in the care of Have Trunk Will Travel. The ADI contacted AHA, urging them to re-evaluate how they assess the use of animals in films and the statements being made which effectively endorse the use of performing animals.

Have Trunk Will Travel responded to the video stating, "The video shows heavily edited and very short snippets, obviously taken surreptitiously six years ago, purporting mistreatment of our elephants. If there was truly any abuse going on why wait six minutes, much less six years?" and added, "None of the footage being shown was taken during Tai's training for Water for Elephants."

== Release ==
=== Critical response ===
On review aggregate Rotten Tomatoes, the film holds an approval rating of 60% based on 199 reviews, with an average rating of 6.10/10. The site's critical consensus reads, "It's a tale tastefully told and beautifully filmed, but Water for Elephants suffers from a pronounced lack of chemistry between its leads." Metacritic, which assigns a weighted mean rating to reviews, the film has a score of 52 out of 100, based on 35 critics, indicating "mixed or average reviews". Audiences polled by CinemaScore gave the film an average grade of "A−" on an A+ to F scale.

Roger Ebert of the Chicago Sun-Times gave the film three stars out of four, stating: "This is good sound family entertainment, a safe PG-13 but not a dumb one, and it's a refreshing interlude before we hurtle into the summer blockbuster season." Todd McCarthy of The Hollywood Reporter gave the film a positive review. He stated: "The Reese Witherspoon-Robert Pattinson film will please fans of Sara Gruen's best-seller, but it lacks the vital spark that would have made the drama truly compelling on the screen."

Kenneth Turan of the Los Angeles Times gave the film a positive review, stating that "despite the stars' lack of romantic chemistry, there's much to enjoy in this cinematic retelling of Sara Gruen's big top bestseller, starting with the spectacular circus setting." James Berardinelli, film critic for ReelViews, wrote: "There's an old-fashioned vibe to Water for Elephants; it's the kind of movie Hollywood once turned out with regularity but rarely does anymore."

Richard Corliss of Time stated: "The proceedings get so slow and saccharine that viewers will relish the film's moments of redeeming idiocy. In one of them, Marlena whispers to Jacob, 'Bring Rosie to my tent and don't tell anyone' — as if the roustabouts wouldn't notice a 12-ft.-tall, 10,000-lb. creature striding down the midway. Granted, they'd also take a look at his handler, the divoon Robert Pattinson; but Rosie has a pretty strong odor too, and that's what will stick to you after seeing Water for Elephants."

Some critics, however, praised the film's cast. Mick LaSalle of the San Francisco Chronicle stated that Pattinson succeeded at holding his own at the center of a major feature and that Witherspoon, while an odd fit for the role, was "actress enough to make it work." He continued: "The affectionate but turbulent dynamic among [Christoph] Waltz, Pattinson, and Witherspoon is endlessly watchable." Peter Travers of Rolling Stone also wrote that Pattinson and Witherspoon "smoldered" under the "golden gaze of Rodrigo Prieto's camera."

=== Box office ===
Water for Elephants was released in theaters on April 22, 2011. In the United States and Canada, the film was released theatrically in 2,817 conventional theaters. The film grossed $6,924,487 during its opening day on April 22, 2011, with midnight screenings in 2,817 locations. Overall the film made $16,842,353 and debuted at No. 3 on its opening weekend. On its second weekend, it dropped to No. 4 and grossed $9,342,413 - $3,313 per theater. By its third weekend it dropped down to No. 6 and made $6,069,603 - $2,322 per theater. As of September 27, 2011, its final gross is $58,709,717 in the United States and $58,385,185 overseas, for a total of $117,094,902.

=== Accolades ===
Group	Category	Recipient	Result
NewNowNext Awards	Next Must See Movie		Nominated
2011 Teen Choice Awards	Choice Movie – Drama		Nominated
2011 Teen Choice Awards	Choice Movie Actor – Drama	Robert Pattinson	Won
2011 Teen Choice Awards	Choice Movie Actress – Drama	Reese Witherspoon	Nominated
38th People's Choice Awards	Favorite Drama Movie		Won
38th People's Choice Awards	Favorite Book Adaption		Nominated
38th People's Choice Awards	Favorite Movie Actor	Robert Pattinson	Nominated
38th People's Choice Awards	Favorite Movie Actress	Reese Witherspoon	Nominated
16th Satellite Awards	Best Original Score	James Newton Howard	Nominated
16th Satellite Awards	Best Art Direction and Production Design	Jack Fisk	Nominated
16th Satellite Awards	Best Costume Design	Jacqueline West	Won

=== Home media ===
The film was released on Blu-ray and DVD on November 1, 2011, in two physical packages: a 1-disc DVD and a 2-disc Blu-ray/Digital Copy combo pack.

== See also ==
- Water for Elephants, a 2023 musical adaptation of the book and film
- Cruelty to animals
- Ringling Brothers Circus
