= Water for Elephants (musical) =

2023 musical by Rick Elice

- A New Musical
- Broadway promotional poster
- Music: PigPen Theatre Co.
- Lyrics: PigPen Theatre Co.
- Book: Rick Elice
- Basis: Water for Elephants by Sara Gruen
- Premiere: June 16, 2023: Alliance Theatre; Atlanta
- Productions: 2023 Atlanta; 2024 Broadway; 2025 US Tour

Water for Elephants is a musical with music and lyrics by PigPen Theatre Co. and a book by Rick Elice. It is based on the 2006 novel of the same name by Sara Gruen.

The musical opened on Broadway starring Grant Gustin on March 20, 2024, at the Imperial Theatre following previews beginning February 24. Critical reviews were mixed, while receiving praise for its visual spectacle and production values. It received seven nominations at the 77th Tony Awards, including Best Musical. The Broadway musical closed on December 8, 2024.

The musical is licensed through Broadway Licensing.

== Synopsis ==
=== Act 1 ===
Mr. Jacob Jankowski, an elderly Polish-American man living in an assisted living home, visits O’Brien’s One-Ring Circus before it heads out of town. He reveals to the employees that he worked with circus animals in his youth. He reminisces on his first circus job. During the Great Depression, Jacob hops a train "going anywhere." Camel, an older circus worker, and Wade, the foreman, try to intimidate him off the train, but he stands his ground. Camel reveals to Jacob that the train belongs to the "Benzini Brothers Most Spectacular Show on Earth" ("Anywhere/Another Train"). Jacob is hired for one day’s work and will leave after their next stop ("The Road Don’t Make You Young").

Jacob walks in on Marlena, the star performer, comforting her horse, Silver Star ("Easy"). Jacob, who studied veterinary medicine at Cornell University, shows August, the ringmaster and Marlena’s husband, that the horse is foundering and may need to be euthanized. After hearing that Jacob was studying to be a vet before being forced to drop out of school, August offers Jacob a job as the circus vet if he is able to keep Silver Star working. August takes Jacob to the menagerie and tricks Jacob into getting attacked by a toothless lion - he boasts that nothing at his circus is real as people only want to see spectacular illusions instead of the grim reality ("The Lion Has Got No Teeth"). Later that night it's revealed that Wade "red-lighted" another circus worker on August’s command, throwing him off the train. Camel warns Jacob of the dangers of the circus, but Jacob decides to stay because he has nowhere else to go ("I Choose the Ride").

Jacob ultimately has to put Silver Star down as the injury has progressed beyond saving. When the circus arrives at the no-longer-in-business Fox Brothers Train, August plans on buying a horse to replace Silver Star. However, all that remains is an old elephant, Rosie ("Ode to an Elephant"). Jacob and Marlena struggle to train Rosie ("Just Our Luck"), and August, unsatisfied with their progress, begins to abuse Rosie with a bullhook. Marlena tells Jacob that August is prone to fits of rage ("I Shouldn’t Be Surprised").

Jacob, Marlena, and August spend the evening at a speakeasy. Jacob tells them that he had been studying to be a vet to follow in his father's footsteps and his father had even ordered a sign reading "Jankowski and Son" to put over their practice, but he and Jacob's mother were killed in a car accident before he could pass his final exams. Jacob had hopped the train because the bank had confiscated his childhood home as well as his father's practice, so he was leaving the city to start a new life. Marlena empathizes with Jacob's story as she had run away from her family to marry August. Jealous of the tender moment, August becomes violent again, this time towards Marlena. When the speakeasy is raided, Jacob and Marlena escape from the police together. Outside of the speakeasy, they share a moment, and Jacob kisses Marlena. Marlena runs away, and Jacob revels in his thrilling situation ("Silver Stars").

In Chicago, Marlena and Rosie are set to make their debut as the star act, but Rosie refuses to move, forcing August to improvise. Furious, August prepares to beat her with his bullhook when Rosie swipes August down with her trunk. She is about to kill him when Jacob instinctively yells zostań, the Polish word for "stop". Rosie, whose previous trainer was Polish, understands the language and can now follow Jacob’s commands. The circus celebrates finally being "back in business" ("The Grand Spec").

=== Act 2 ===
Mr. Jankowski reminisces on his younger days spent with Rosie ("Funny Angel"). With Rosie as their new star, The Benzini Brothers Circus becomes a success. As Jacob teaches the circus workers Polish, he grows increasingly close with Marlena ("Zostań"). This draws the eye of circus workers Barbara, Walter, and Camel, who convince Jacob that a relationship with Marlena will bring nothing but trouble ("Squeaky Wheel").

Jacob plans to leave the circus to Marlena’s dismay - August grows suspicious of their relationship. He accuses Marlena of cheating on him and Marlena and August exchange blows ("You’ve Got Nothing (Part 1)"). August orders Wade to red-light Jacob, Walter and Camel. Jacob and Marlena disappear, and a reluctant Wade pushes Walter and Camel off the train as it’s going over a bridge, killing them ("You’ve Got Nothing (Part 2)").

In a hotel room, Marlena regrets how poorly she let people treat her, but resolves to trust herself from now on ("What Do You Do"). Jacob finds Marlena, and they are free to be together for the first time ("Wild"). They form a plan: They will go back to the show, perform the first half, then run off with Rosie, Camel, and Walter while August finishes the show. When they arrive at the circus, Jacob goes to Walter and Camel's compartment, but only finds Walter's pet dog Queenie. Wade walks in on him and Jacob realizes what happened. The two end up fighting until Wade smacks Jacob's head against a post and runs off. When he comes to his senses, Jacob takes a knife and resolves to kill August as he takes a nap before the show ("Go Home"), but can’t go through with it.

During the show, a guilt-ridden Wade opens the menagerie cages, and the animals stampede the circus. Many people die, including August, who is killed by Rosie wielding his bullhook. Being the only person to see this, Jacob contemplates whether his indecision to try and stop Rosie was him being frozen with fear or a deliberate desire to let August die. Jacob and Marlena make it out alive and soon after got married, keeping Rosie and Queenie in their care. Jacob went on to pass his exams and they had five children, allowing Jacob to finally hang the sign his father had ordered before he eventually retired and left the practice in the hands of his children. After revealing that Marlena died not too long ago, Mr. Jankowski decides that he misses the circus life, and accepts a job at O’Brien’s One-Ring Circus, jokingly telling Marlena's spirit that he's running away with the circus before declaring that he's finally home ("Finale (I choose the ride)").

== Development ==
In 2015, Peter Schneider, Elisabetta di Mambro, Broadway Across America, and Mehr! Entertainment acquired the rights to adapt Gruen's novel into a musical. PigPen Theatre Co. announced their involvement alongside Rick Elice in 2018.

== Production history ==
=== Atlanta (2023) ===
The musical premiered at the Alliance Theatre in Atlanta, Georgia, on June 16, 2023, after previews beginning on June 7, and ran through July 9; it was directed by Jessica Stone and featured choreography by Jesse Robb and Shana Carroll; Carroll also created the show's circus designs. Sets were by Takeshi Kata, costumes by David Israel Reynoso, lighting by Bradley King, with sound by Jessica Paz. David Bengalli designed the show's projections, while Camille Labarre made the show's puppets. Daryl Waters prepared the show's orchestration.

=== Broadway (2024) ===
All of the members of the Atlanta creative team returned for the Broadway production, except for Jessica Paz. Much of the Atlanta cast would reprise their roles, with new additions including Gregg Edelman as Mr. Jankowski, Paul Alexander Nolan as August, and Grant Gustin making his Broadway debut as Jacob Jankowski. The production opened at the Imperial Theatre on March 21, 2024, after previews began on February 24. Kyle Selig replaced Gustin in September. The show closed on December 8, 2024, after playing 300 regular performances.

A filing with the Securities and Exchange Commission indicated that the Broadway production would be capitalized for up to $25 million, making it likely the most expensive production of the 2023–2024 Broadway season.

=== US Tour (2025-26) ===
The United States national tour premiered on September 30, 2025 at the Hippodrome Theatre. The production stars Zachary Keller as Jacob, Helen Krushinski as Marlena, Robert Tully as Mr. Jankowski, and Connor Sullivan as August. The tour is currently scheduled to end at Appleton, Wisconsin's Fox Cities PAC theater in May 2027.

== Musical numbers ==
Act I

- Overture - Orchestra
- Prologue - Company
- "Anywhere/Another Train" - Jacob, Camel, Wade, Company
- "The Road Don't Make You Young" - Company
- "Easy" - Marlena
- "The Lion Has Got No Teeth" - August, Jacob, Company
- "I Choose the Ride" - Camel, Jacob, Company
- "Ode to an Elephant" - Mr. Jankowski, Jacob, Marlena, August
- "Just Our Luck" - Mr. Jankowski, Barbara, Camel, Walter, Vera, Sue
- "I Shouldn't Be Surprised" - Marlena, Mr. Jankowski
- "Silver Stars" - Jacob
- "The Grand Spec" - August, Company

Act II

- "Funny Angel" - Mr. Jankowski
- "Zostań" - Company
- "Squeaky Wheel" - Barbara, Walter, Camel, Jacob
- "You've Got Nothing" - August, Jacob, Marlena, Camel, Walter, Wade
- "What Do You Do?" - Marlena
- "Wild" - Marlena, Jacob
- "The Road Don't Make You Young (Reprise)" - Wade, Company
- "Go Home" - Jacob, Company
- "Zostań (Reprise)" - Jacob, Mr. Jankowski, Company
- "I Choose the Ride (Reprise)" - Company

== Characters and original casts ==
Character	Atlanta	Broadway	US Tour
Character	2023	2024	2025
Jacob Jankowski	Ryan Vasquez	Grant Gustin	Zachary Keller
Mr. Jankowski	Harry Groener	Gregg Edelman	Robert Tully
Marlena Rackinger June	Isabelle McCalla	Isabelle McCalla	Helen Krushinski
August Rackinger Charlie O'Brien	Bryan Fenkart	Paul Alexander Nolan	Connor Sullivan
Camel	Stan Brown	Stan Brown	Javier Garcia
Walter	Joe De Paul	Joe De Paul	Tyler West
Barbara	Sara Gettelfinger	Sara Gettelfinger	Ruby Gibbs
Wade	Wade McCollum	Wade McCollum	Grant Huneycutt

=== Notable Broadway replacements ===
- Jacob: Kyle Selig

== Awards and nominations ==
=== 2024 Broadway production ===
Year	Award	Category	Nominee	Result
2024	Tony Awards	Best Musical		Nominated
2024	Tony Awards	Best Direction of a Musical	Jessica Stone	Nominated
2024	Tony Awards	Best Book of a Musical	Rick Elice	Nominated
2024	Tony Awards	Best Scenic Design of a Musical	Takeshi Kata	Nominated
2024	Tony Awards	Best Costume Design of a Musical	David Israel Reynoso	Nominated
2024	Tony Awards	Best Lighting Design of a Musical	David Bengali and Bradley King	Nominated
2024	Tony Awards	Best Choreography	Shana Carroll and Jesse Robb	Nominated
2024	Drama League Awards	Outstanding Production of a Musical		Nominated
2024	Outer Critics Circle Awards	Outstanding New Broadway Musical		Nominated
2024	Outer Critics Circle Awards	Outstanding Direction of a Musical	Jessica Stone	Won
2024	Outer Critics Circle Awards	Outstanding Choreography	Jesse Robb and Shana Carroll	Nominated
2024	Outer Critics Circle Awards	Outstanding Lighting Design	Bradley King	Nominated
2024	Outer Critics Circle Awards	Outstanding Projection Design	David Bengali	Nominated
2024	Broadway.com Audience Choice Awards	Favorite Breakthrough Performance (Male)	Grant Gustin	Won
2024	Drama Desk Awards	Outstanding Direction of a Musical	Jessica Stone	Won
2024	Drama Desk Awards	Outstanding Choreography	Jesse Robb and Shana Carroll	Nominated
2024	Drama Desk Awards	Outstanding Costume Design of a Musical	David Israel Reynoso	Nominated
2024	Drama Desk Awards	Outstanding Lighting Design of a Musical	Bradley King	Nominated
2024	Drama Desk Awards	Outstanding Sound Design of a Musical	Walter Trarbach	Won
2024	Drama Desk Awards	Outstanding Fight Choreography	Cha Ramos	Won
2024	Drama Desk Awards	Outstanding Puppetry	Ray Wetmore, JR Goodman, and Camille Labarre	Won
2024	Chita Rivera Awards	Outstanding Choreography in a Broadway Show	Jesse Robb and Shana Carroll	Won
2024	Chita Rivera Awards	Outstanding Ensemble in a Broadway Show		Nominated
2024	Chita Rivera Awards	Outstanding Dancer in a Broadway Show	Antoine Boissereau	Won

== Reception ==
The Atlanta production received mixed reviews. ArtsATL said the show was "a triumph from a technical perspective," praising the show's set design, lighting, and projections, the lifelike puppets, choreography, and actors. However, the site felt the story "[left] a lot to be desired," with gaps in the story, unelaborated character backstories, and songs which didn't move the plot forward.
