= Signe Nielsen =

American landscape architect

- Education: Smith College, City College of New York, Pratt Institute
- Occupation(s): landscape architect, academic
- Title: Founding Principal of Mathew Nielsen Landscape Architects, Professor of Urban Design and Landscape Architecture at Pratt Institute

Signe Nielsen is a landscape architect and a founding principal at Mathews Nielsen Landscape Architects in New York City, US. She is also a professor of urban design and landscape architecture at Pratt Institute and an active participant in New York City design policy and approvals. Her work focuses on the areas of green design, sustainability, and public space design.

== Early life and education ==
Nielsen is a native of Paris, France, and she has degrees across several disciplines. She has a degree in urban planning from Smith College, a degree in landscape architecture from City College of New York, and a degree in construction management from the Pratt Institute.

== Career ==
Nielsen's work in landscape architecture focuses on both creating a policy environment that supports good design and on creating spaces that are good for people and the environment. Her career involves more than 400 projects around the world. She was nominated for and featured in the 2015 Built by Women exhibition at the Center for Architecture in New York City, an event supported by the American Institute of Architects New York chapter.

Along with Thomas Heatherwick, she was a lead designer for Pier 55 in Hudson River Park, a rebuild of Pier 54. The goal of the design was to provide recreation and walking space as well as cultural and educational space, and the design allows these activities to coexist. She also utilized tactical urbanism to create a greenspace at Freeman Plaza in Hudson Square in Manhattan, described as an unlikely space for a park. The park is part of a broader effort to make the streetscape in Hudson Square more sustainable through the addition of trees, greenspace, and water drainage systems and an effort to reclaim urban spaces that are currently dominated by cars.

Her firm has contributed to knowledge and practice of environmental design. The firm is a cited source on the use of lightweight soil for green roofs. The firm contributed to the New York City manual, "DDC Cool and Green Roofing Manual."

Beyond her design work, Nielsen is active in supporting design with a public purpose, particularly in New York. She has stated that she believes strong policy is an important partner to design. She has written books on sustainable and green design for the New York City Department of Design and Construction. She has also been a member of the New York City Public Design Commission and served as its president. She presided over decisions on some controversial topics, such as the removal of the statue of J. Marion Sims from Central Park. Nielsen is also a professor, having taught at the Pratt Institute for thirty years.

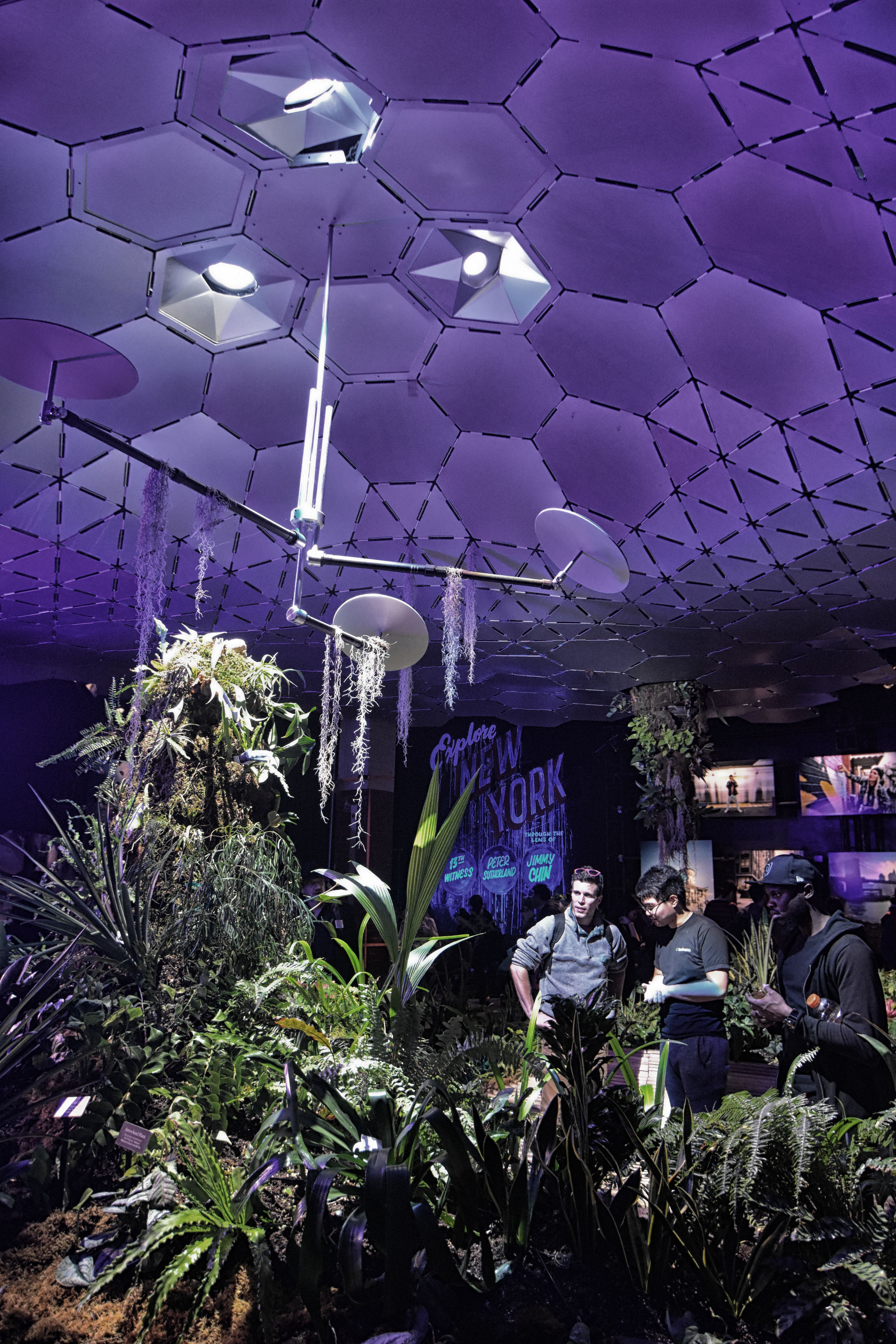
Lowline Lab - a full-scale mock-up of the future Lowline park. Architect: James Ramsey, RAAD Studio; Landscape Architect: Signe Nielsen, Mathews Nielsen Landscape Architects, with John Mini Distinctive Landscapes Lower East Side, Manhattan

=== Select built works ===
- Little Island, New York City
- Freeman Plaza, New York City
- Lowline Lab, New York City

=== Major publications ===
- DDC, 2007. “DDC Cool and Green Roofing Manual.” Prepared for New York City Department of Design & Construction Office of Sustainable Design, by Gruzen Samton Architects LLP with Amis Inc., Flack & Kurtz Inc., Mathews Nielsen Landscape Architects P.C., and SHADE Consulting, LLC.
- Nielsen, Signe, "Guerilla Resilience." Brandt, Denise Hoffman, Catherine Seavitt Nordenson, Bernard Anne Spitzer School of Architecture, and City University of New York. City College. Waterproofing New York. Urban Research 02. New York City: Terreform, 2016.

=== Recent awards ===
- 2018 American Institute of Architects George S. Lewis Award
- 2012 Public Design Commission Design Awards Special Recognition
- 2012 American Institute of Architects New York Chapter Merit Award for Unbuilt Project
- 2012 Municipal Art Society MASterworks Best Neighborhood Catalyst Award
- 2011 American Institute of Architects New York Chapter Urban Design Honor Award
- 2011 American Institute of Architects New York Chapter Award of Merit
- 2011 American Society of Landscape Architects New York Chapter Merit Award
- 2011 Building Brooklyn Educational Design Award
