= Little Island at Pier 55 =

Park in Manhattan, New York

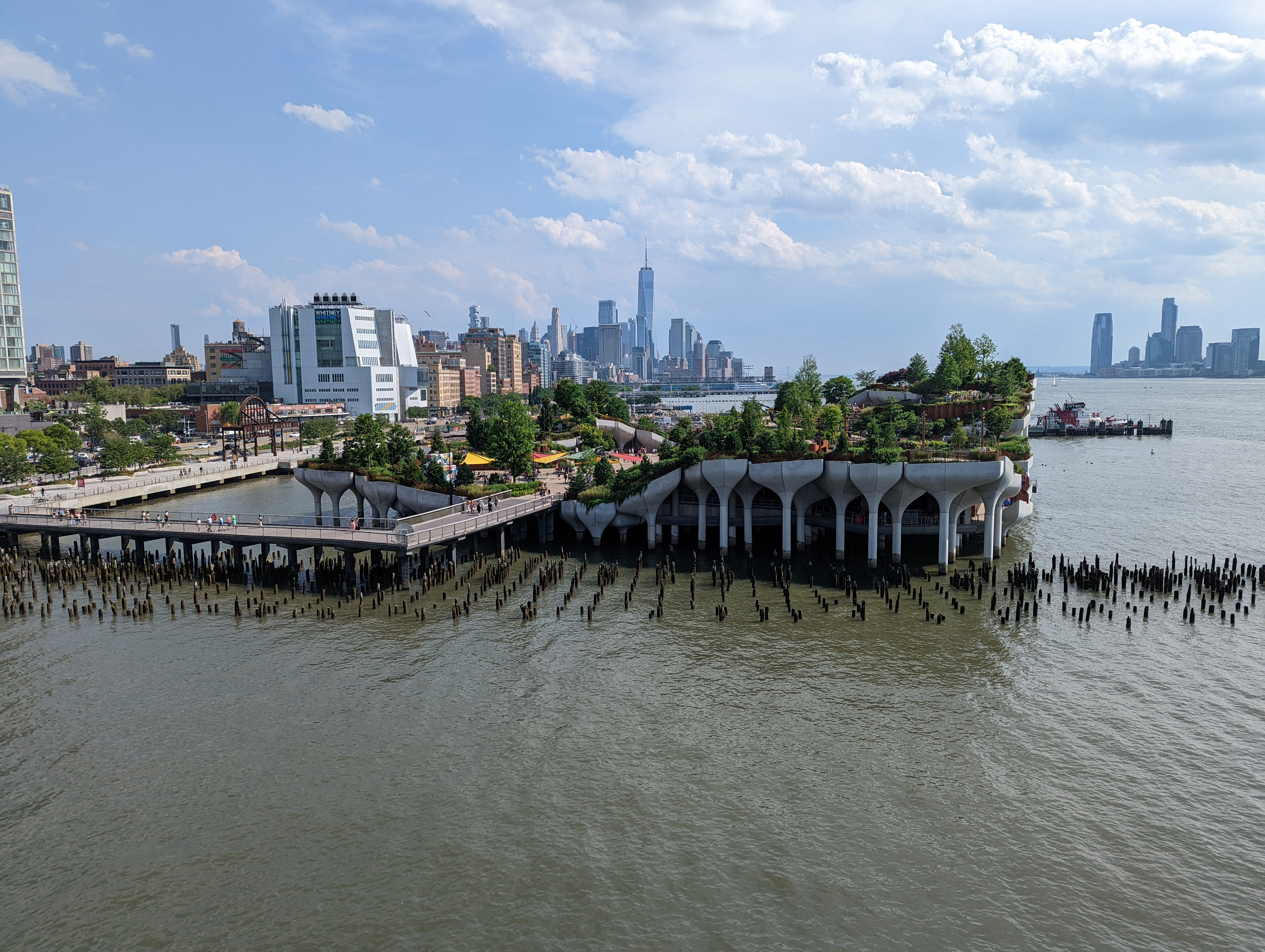
- Little Island (at Pier 55) along the Hudson River with background views of Manhattan
- Interactive map of Little Island at Pier 55
- Type: Urban park
- Location: Manhattan, New York
- Coordinates: 40°44′31″N 74°00′37″W
- Area: 2.4 acres (0.97 ha)
- Opened: May 21, 2021
- Status: Open all year
- Public transit: Subway: A, C, E, and L trains to 14th Street/Eighth Avenue; NYC Bus: M11, M12, M14D
- Website: littleisland.org

Little Island at Pier 55 (stylized as Little Island @Pier55) is an artificial island and a public park within Hudson River Park, just off the western coast of Manhattan in New York City. Designed by Heatherwick Studio, it is near the intersection of West Street and West 13th Street in the Meatpacking District and Chelsea neighborhoods of Manhattan. It is located atop Hudson River's Pier 55, connected to the rest of Hudson River Park by footbridges at 13th and 14th Streets. Little Island has two concession stands, a small stage, and a 687-seat amphitheater.

Little Island covers 2.4 acres (0.97 ha) and is supported by 132 pot-shaped structures (called "tulips") suspended above the water, which in turn stand on 280 concrete pilings extending into the riverbed. The tops of the pots range from 15 to 62 ft (4.6 to 18.9 m) above the mean waterline. Engineer Arup Group oversaw the installation of the pots manufactured in upstate New York by the Fort Miller Company. The park has various lawns, paths, and plants, which were arranged by landscape architect Signe Nielsen. The plantings and soil were engineered to reduce erosion and were also arranged aesthetically.

Plans arose in November 2014 for a new park, known as Pier 55, designed by Heatherwick Studio and largely funded by Barry Diller and Diane von Fürstenberg, with some funding from the New York City and state governments. Originally, construction was to begin in 2015 and the park would have been completed in 2018 or 2019. However, the park's construction was delayed by lawsuits from the City Club of New York. Plans for the park were scrapped in September 2017 due to lawsuits and cost overruns. The next month, the proposal was revived when New York Governor Andrew Cuomo agreed to provide funding for the park. Construction of the structure began in April 2018 and a symbolic cornerstone was laid in December 2018. The project was renamed Little Island in 2019 and opened on May 21, 2021.

== Description ==
Little Island adjoins Hudson River Park near the intersection of West Street and West 13th Street in Manhattan. The park is in the Meatpacking District and Chelsea neighborhoods of Manhattan. Commissioned by businessman Barry Diller and designed by Thomas Heatherwick's company Heatherwick Studio, the park covers 2.4 acres (0.97 ha). It is accessible from two passageways extending across the water from Hudson River Park: a southern esplanade at Little West 12th Street and a northern esplanade at West 14th Street. The park can fit 1,000 people simultaneously. As of 2025, the park opens every day at 6 a.m., with different ending times depending on the season.

Arup Group oversaw the structural design of the park. Numerous other firms were involved in the structural design, including precast cement contractor Fort Miller Company, marine consultant Mueser Rutledge Consulting Engineers, and marine contractor Weeks Marine.

=== Structural design ===
Little Island is supported by 132 pot-shaped structures, known as "tulips", which are suspended above the water. The tulips vary in height, sitting between 15 and 62 ft (4.6 and 18.9 m) above the mean waterline. The design was meant to protect the park from a 500-year flood, during which the water level in the river could rise as much as 11 ft (3.4 m). The heights of the pots were intended to give the appearance of a floating leaf or a wave.

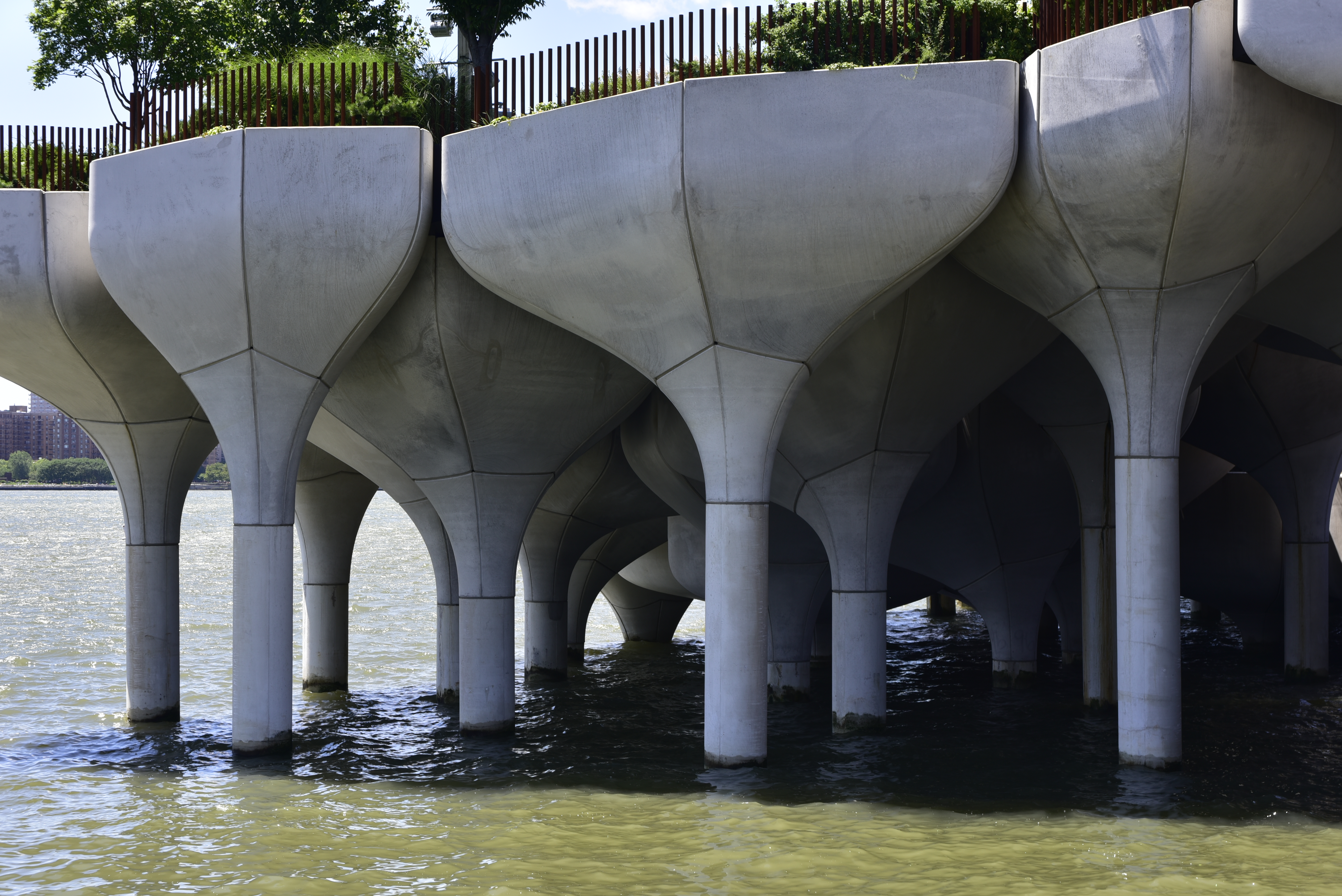
Tulip structure

Each pot has four to six lightweight concrete sections, referred to as "petals", which are designed to reduce the load on the pilings. The precast concrete is also meant to be resistant to erosion and corrosion. The concrete pots were manufactured by the Fort Miller Company at their factory in Easton in Upstate New York. The Fort Miller Company hired a partner to create foam molds for the pieces of the pots using a laser cutter, then cleared out a 600-foot-long building for these foam pieces. Thirty-nine types of molds were fabricated. According to the company's president, "A full one-third of our annual production capacity was displaced by this project."

After the petals were manufactured, they were driven to the Port of Coeymans, a port on the Hudson River south of Albany, New York. At the Port of Coeymans, Weeks Marine assembled the individual petals and used a crane to load them onto barges. The barges typically traveled from the Port of Coeymans to Manhattan in 14 hours. Once in Manhattan, the pots were installed on their supports using a 350-ton crane. The largest support is 30 ft (9.1 m) tall and weighs 90 short tons (80 long tons; 82 t). The pots stand on 267 or 280 concrete pilings, which extend at most 200 ft (61 m) into the bottom of the Hudson River. Each piling measures 3 ft (0.91 m) in diameter and can handle loads of 250 to 350 short tons (220 to 310 long tons; 230 to 320 t). The pilings were hollowed at their cores, with metal guide rails to allow the pots to be installed without the pilings tipping over. The edges of the pots are placed 9 ± 3 in (229 ± 76 mm) apart. The pilings' design was intended to evoke the design of the exposed pilings under Pier 54, which had previously occupied the site. Some of the pilings still exist and are used as marine habitats.

=== Landscape ===
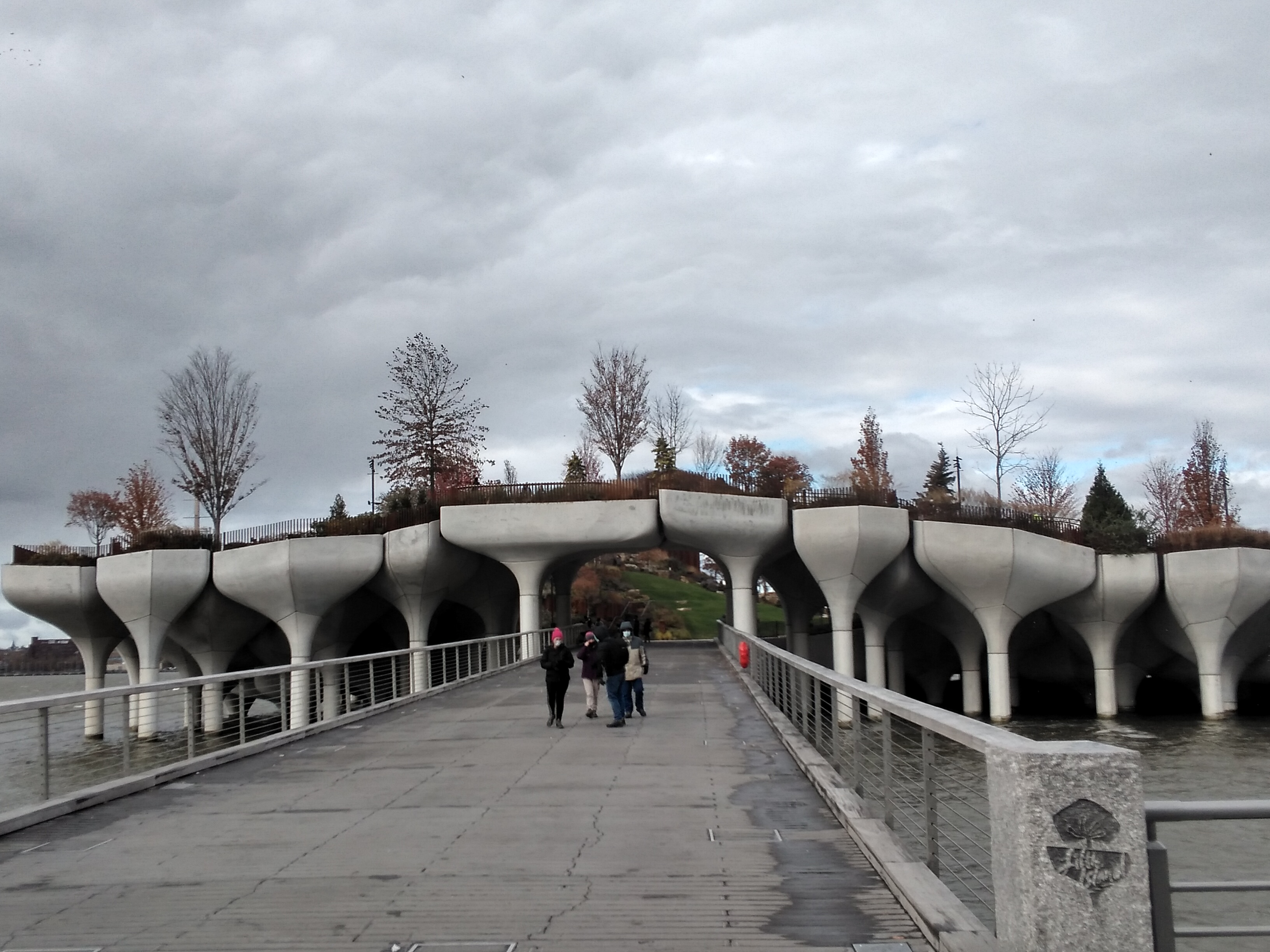
Little Island entrance at 14th Street, seen in November 2021

Signe Nielsen of Mathews Nielsen Landscape Architects was the landscape architect for the park, while BrightView Landscape Development was the landscape contractor. Nielsen "wanted New Yorkers to feel delight and excitement around every turn from the moment they set foot here." To accomplish this, the plantings were arranged in specific color patterns. For instance, a portion of the park was planted with yellow, gold, lavender, and purple plants contrasting with each other.

The landscape includes 35 tree species and 65 shrub species. In addition, there are 270 species of perennials and grasses, (Note: The Washington Post cites 290 species of perennials and grasses.) for a total of over 350 species of flora. At the park's opening in 2021, the landscape contained 66,000 bulbs and 114 trees. The original trees are up to 35 ft (11 m) tall with trunk diameters of 12 in (300 mm). The trees are planted in 4 ft (1.2 m) of soil, which is stabilized by geofibers and fed by a large irrigation system. The composition of the soil was engineered to reduce erosion, and evergreens and other plantings were used to shield the park from strong winds from the Hudson River.

The park's four corners are designed with different topologies. There are three lawns, as well as a "secret garden" planted exclusively with white flora. One of the lawns, the Main Lawn, is in the center of the park. Alongside the landscapes, the park contains scenic observation areas as well as plazas and performance spaces. There are overlooks at the northwest, southwest, and southeast corners of the park. Walkways lead up to the highest portions of Little Island, in a layout similar to the southern portion of Governors Island. The park also contains objects that visitors could interact with, such as chimes, boulders, and spinning discs. Heatherwick Studio intended for both solo visitors and groups to play with these objects.

=== Concessions and programming ===
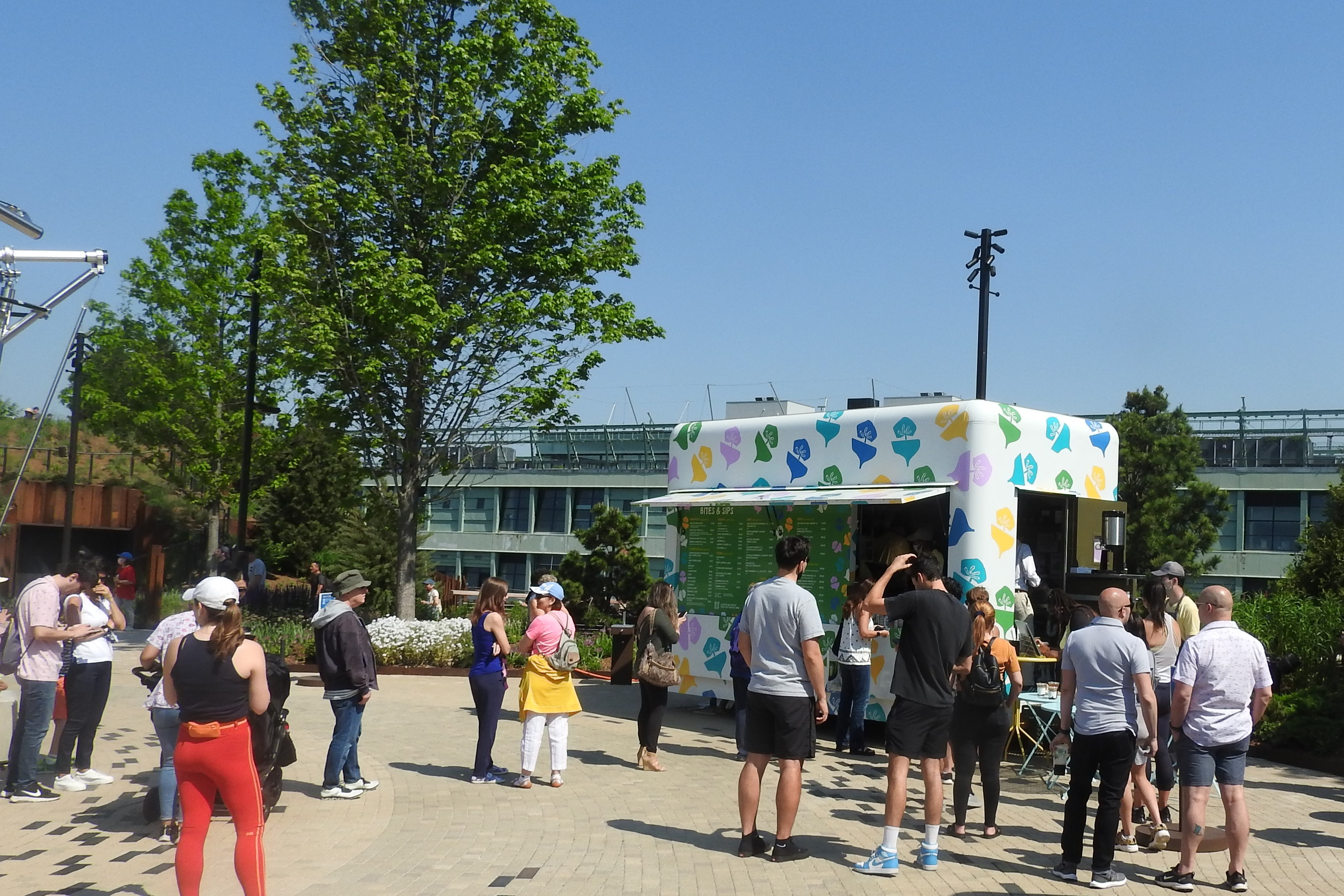
A concession stand, on the island's opening day

A portion of the park contains a small stage and two concession stands, operated by Union Square Events. According to Diller, the park's management had interviewed Danny Meyer's company for the concessionaire position before selecting a smaller firm, Savory Hospitality. Savory operates three concession stalls for food and drinks around a plaza called "The Play Ground". The drinks served at the concession stalls include cocktails that are custom-made for park visitors. The southern portion of the park contains "The Glade", an arts and crafts area for families and children.

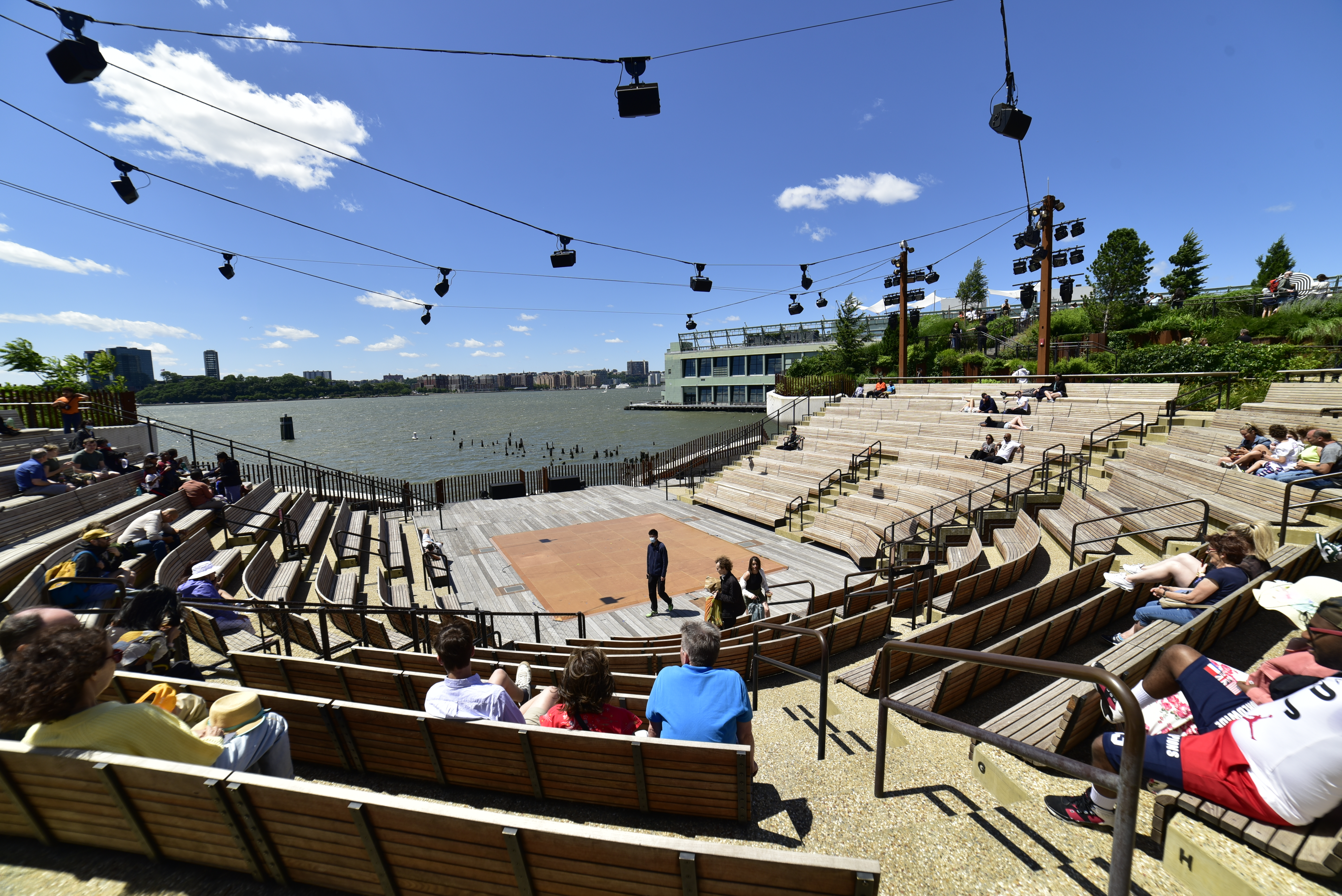
Amphitheater stage

There is also a 687-seat amphitheater nicknamed "The Amph", which is in the western end of Little Island. The Amph is on the north side of the park's tallest hill, where there is a flat pier with public restrooms and actors' changing rooms. The utilities had to be placed on top of the flat pier. At the park's opening in 2021, most events at the Amph were free but, for ticketed shows, thirty percent of tickets were to be sold online. The ticketed shows are largely free or have low admission fees, and educational programming and performances are scheduled for six days a week. The free or low admission fees were a term of Diller's lease agreement from the Hudson River Park Trust, which operates Hudson River Park. Under the terms of the agreement, at least 51 percent of tickets must be under 30 dollars, including tickets provided for free.

== Planning and construction ==
=== Initial proposal ===
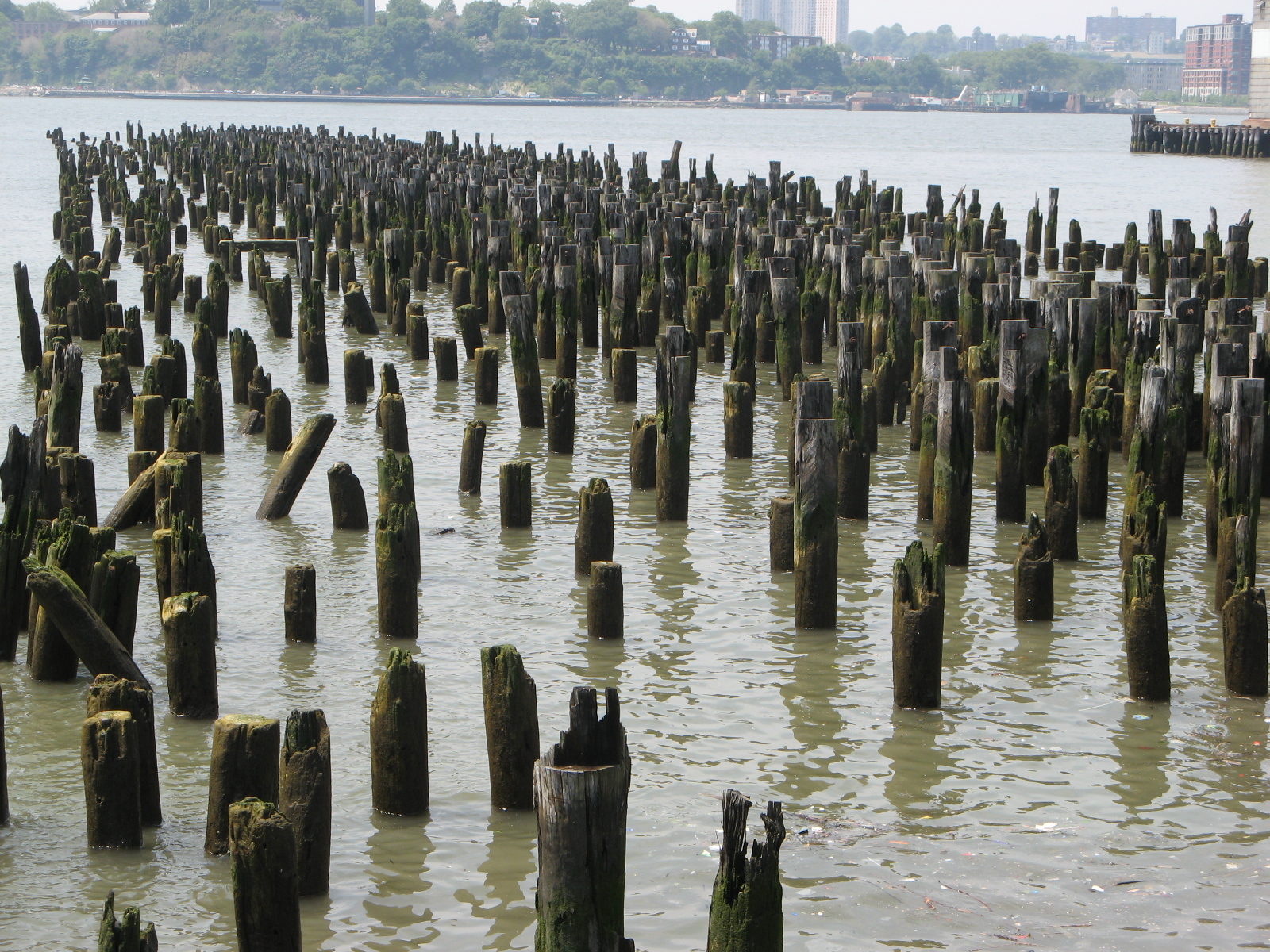
Remnants of Pier 55 in 2010

By 2011, Hudson River Pier 55 was deteriorating, a situation that was worsened by Hurricane Sandy in New York the next year. At a 2011 party for donors of the High Line park, Diana Taylor of the Hudson River Park Trust approached Diller to determine his interest in rebuilding the pier. Diller supported the idea of rebuilding the pier but said he would like to be "ambitious" about the space. His initial concept called for a $35 million amoeba-shaped structure "with a few trees". Following storm surges caused by Hurricane Sandy in 2012, Diller decided to raise the structure about 13 feet (4.0 m) compared with the original plans, making the park less vulnerable to flooding.

In November 2014, it was announced that a new park would be designed by Heatherwick Studio on the site of the former Pier 55 along the Hudson River. Estimates of the 2.3-acre (0.93 ha) park ranged from between $130 million and $160 million. Diller's foundation, headed jointly by his wife Diane von Fürstenberg, contributed $100 million and made plans to donate another $30 million. The city and state promised to give $17 million and $18 million, respectively. At the time, construction was to begin in 2015 and end in 2018 or 2019. The project was provisionally known as Pier 55 and was to be built between the sites of Pier 54 and 56. The park was to float completely above the water, resting on 300 concrete pillars.

By 2015, the Hudson River Park Trust had approved plans to construct a park at 13th Street that extended 186 ft (57 m) west into the Hudson River. Manhattan Community Board 2 also supported plans for the park. Diller had cold-called Heatherwick to design a park at the site. According to Diller, the first plan was "completely unbuildable" and resembled "Noah's Ark in stainless steel". Heatherwick's subsequent plan for the raised concrete pots was designed over a year and a half, while it took Nielsen a year to engineer the individual pots to hold dirt. Von Fürstenberg had tried to convince Diller not to build the park, saying it was vulnerable to rising sea levels, but Diller said the plans were safe from a thousand-year flood. The project was nicknamed Diller Island because of Diller's close association with the project. According to von Fürstenberg, the park plans were all "Barry's dream".

=== Legal issues ===
The City Club of New York filed a lawsuit to stop the park's construction in 2015, alleging that the plans had not undergone a proper environmental review and that the project was instead using an old review conducted on the demolition of the adjacent Pier 54. According to the City Club, the trust had concluded there were no adverse environmental effects in installing 547 deep pilings for the park. The New York State Department of Environmental Conservation (DEC) and the United States Army Corps of Engineers (USACE) had yet to approve plans for the park. The plans received final approval in March 2016. The next month, a judge for the New York Supreme Court dismissed the case. The City Club filed an appeal, and a hearing was scheduled for September 2016. In the meantime, an appellate court placed an injunction in June 2016, temporarily stopping any further work from proceeding. Less than a month later, the injunction was partially lifted, allowing work on nine pilings to proceed. At the appellate hearing, representatives of Pier 55's developers argued that the trust had performed a proper environmental review. The court rejected the City Club's appeal. The suit was escalated to the New York Court of Appeals, which also rejected the appeal.

By November 2016, construction of concrete footings was underway. While appealing the City Club's lawsuit, Diller claimed that developer Douglas Durst was financing the lawsuit against Pier 55. Durst, once a supporter of Hudson River Park, had given up his chairmanship with the Hudson River Park Trust over various disagreements. Early in 2017, Durst confirmed that he had funded the City Club's suit against the project, though he said he had not been involved with the lawsuits for half a year. In an interview with The Villager newspaper, Durst said that he did not want to personalize the dispute over Pier 55. Durst claimed, "I have nothing against Diller—except he said he wishes I had been killed by my brother", businessman Robert Durst. At the time, Robert Durst had been accused of murder, and Diller subsequently apologized for the comments.

The project still faced legal issues from the DEC, over a disputed environmental permit, and from the USACE, over allegations that the plans violated the federal Clean Water Act. The USACE had approved a permit by March 2017, when a United States District Court judge ruled that the permit was invalid because it had failed to consider the proposed park's impact on a nearby wildlife sanctuary. The project's costs had reached $200 million by then, and the work had to be halted. In June 2017, the USACE issued a permit for the park's construction after plans were slightly modified. The City Club filed a complaint the next month, opposing the changes to the permit. The continuing dispute between the City Club and Pier 55 developers led New York City Mayor Bill de Blasio to request that Durst stop funding the lawsuits against the park.

=== Cancellation and revival ===
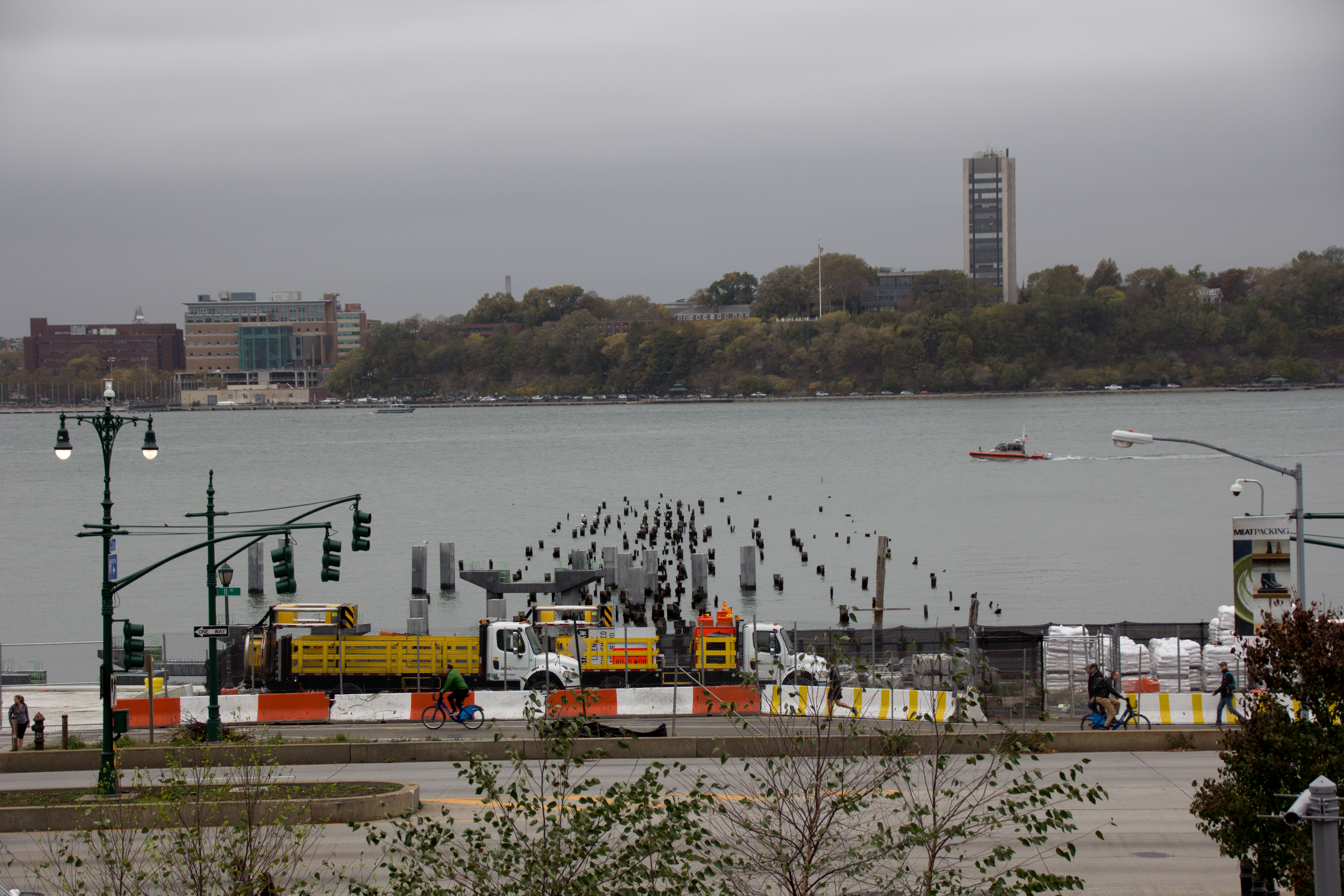
Initial construction work for the north bridge in 2017

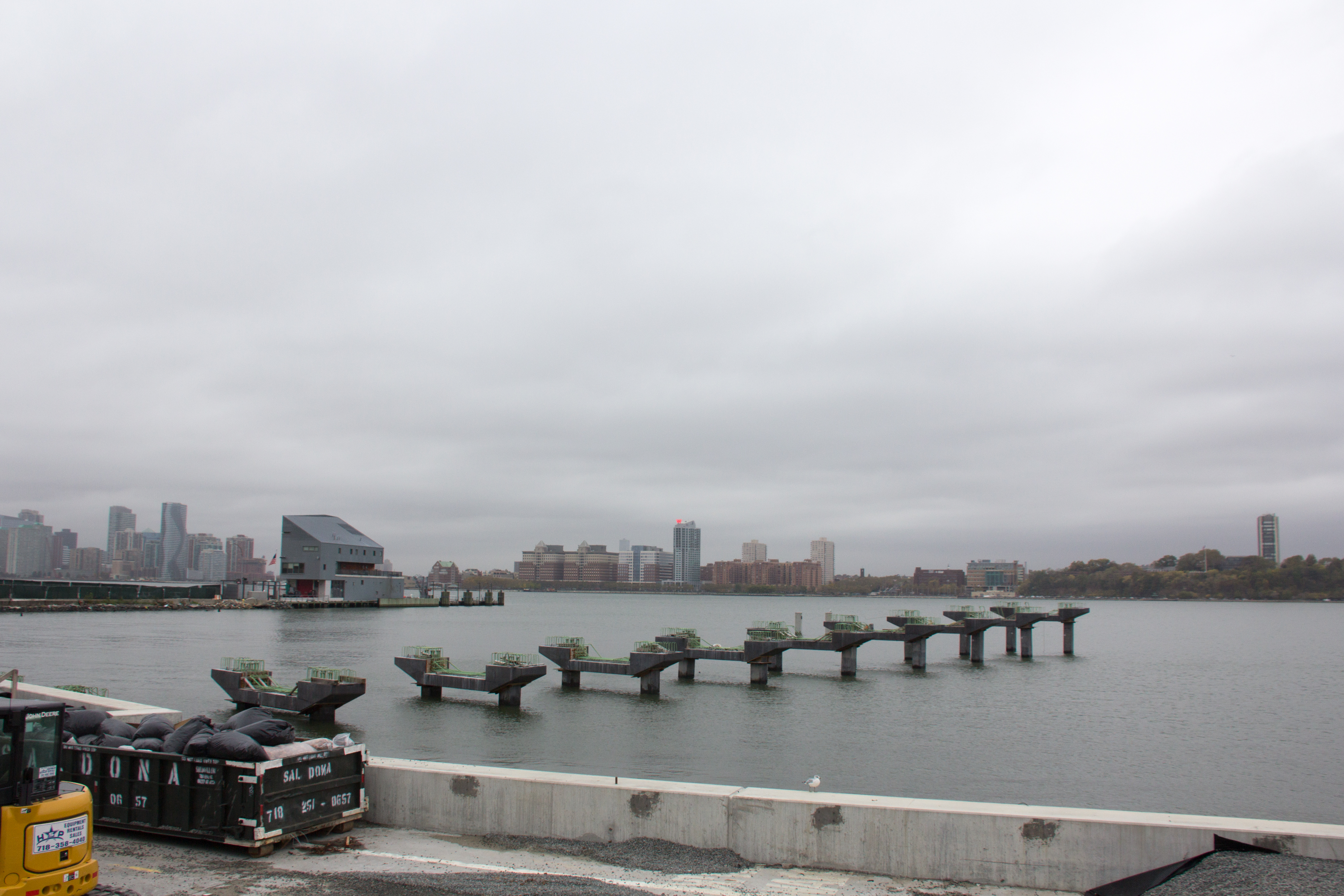
South bridge under construction in 2017

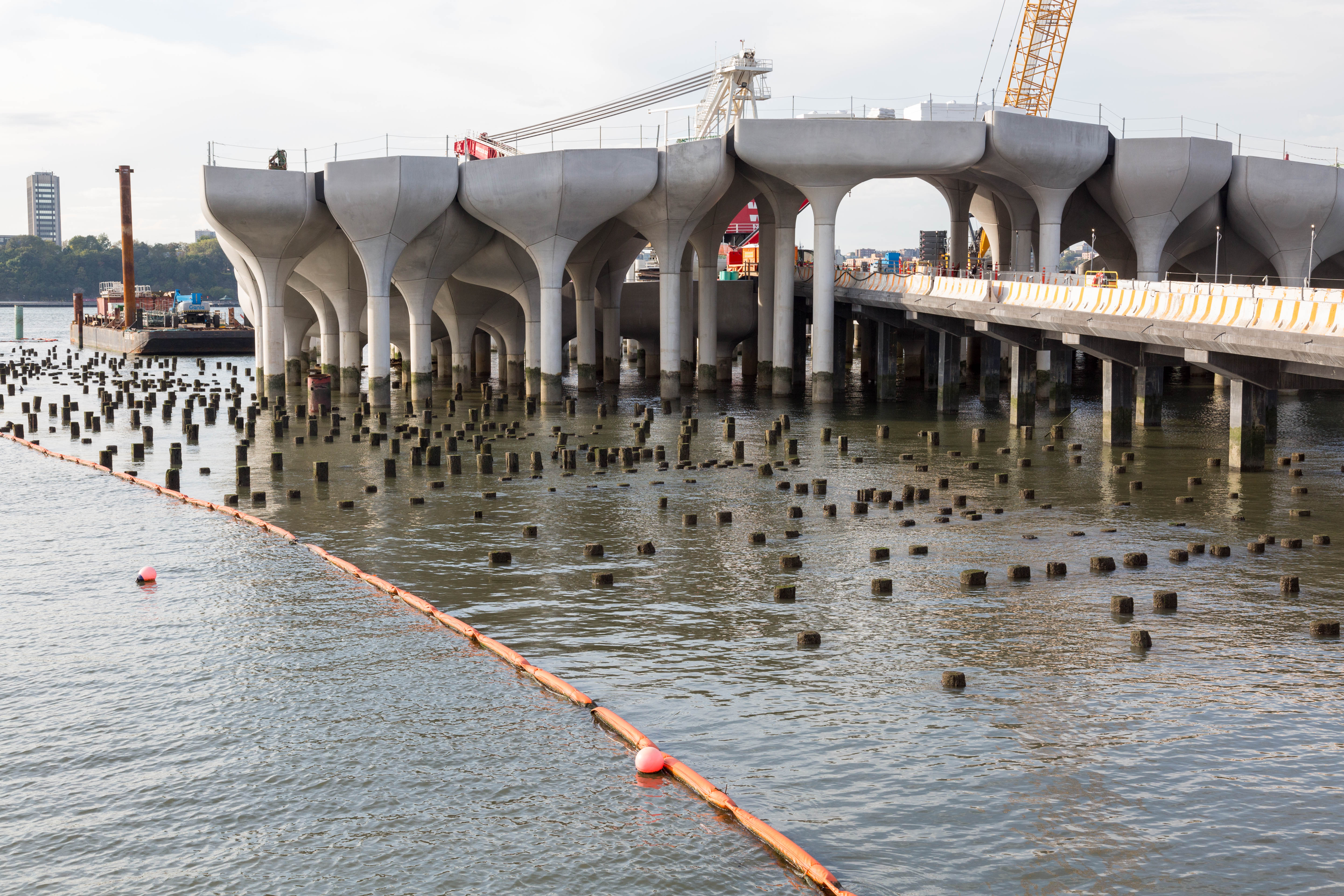
Construction in 2019

Plans for the park were scrapped in September 2017 due to continuing legal disputes. The park also experienced cost overruns as its budget had exceeded $200 million by then. According to Diller, he had already invested $45 million of his foundation's money. On the day the project was canceled, he was scheduled to order $80 million in cement. After his lawyers advised him that the City Club's lawyers may request an injunction on the project, von Fürstenberg and the couple's children advised Diller to stop the project and "go where you're wanted". The City Club's lawyers expressed excitement over the park's cancellation. Among the disappointed supporters of the project were the Hudson River Park Trust, de Blasio, New York Governor Andrew Cuomo, and U.S. Senator Chuck Schumer.

The cancellation of the park lasted forty-three days. On October 25, 2017, Cuomo arranged an agreement in which Pier 55 would be completed. Cuomo agreed to complete the remaining 30 percent of the incomplete Hudson River Park, provided that he won the 2018 New York gubernatorial election. Cuomo also promised the ecology of the Hudson River estuary would not be adversely affected by the construction of Pier 55. In exchange, the City Club's lawyers dropped their lawsuits against Pier 55.

=== Completion ===
Cuomo provided $50 million for the park in April 2018, but with the condition that the city raise a matching amount. Construction of the structure began the same month, with the construction of walkways from the Hudson River Park esplanade to the future park site. The new estimate for the project was $250 million. By that August, the pilings were being installed. A symbolic cornerstone was laid in December 2018. At this time, the first of the park's pots was delivered from upstate New York and installed at Pier 55. The park itself was planned to be significantly completed in 2020 and open to the public in early 2021.

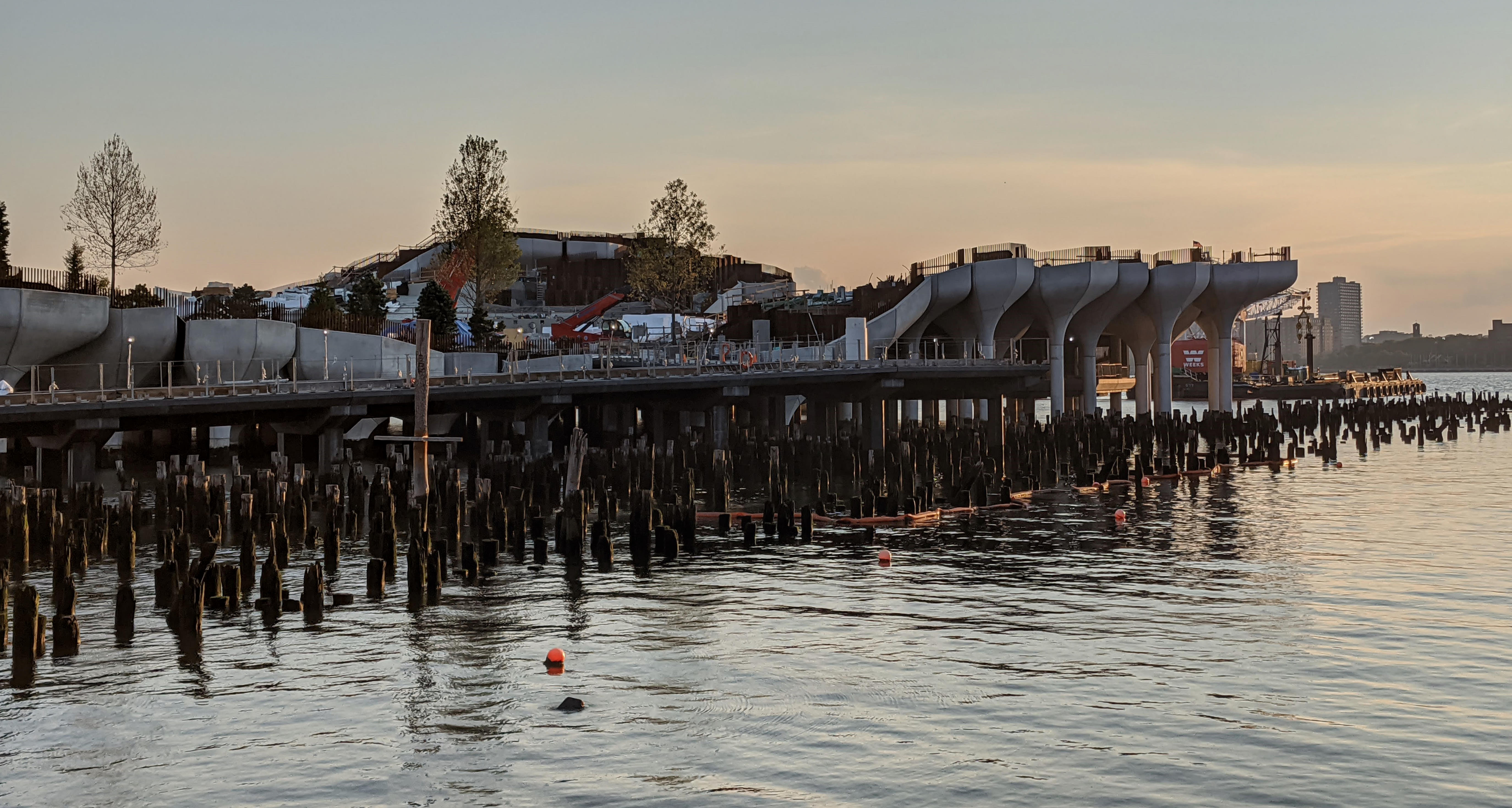
Little Island as seen in 2020

The pots were manufactured and delivered by the Fort Miller Company starting in 2018. The pilings upon which the pots were to be installed, could only be driven from May to November of each year. As a result, 164 piles were driven in 2018 and the remaining 103 piles were driven from May to July 2019. The subsequent construction of the landscape, concession, and programming areas required coordination between the different contractors due to limited space for staging areas. Several cranes were used, including one on a barge, and materials were delivered by barge.

Much of the park's perimeter had been installed by October 2019, and the Pier 55 project was renamed Little Island in November. The first trees at Little Island were installed in March 2020. All the piles and pots had been installed by the next month, and the layers of soil supporting the vegetation were being planted. During the COVID-19 pandemic in New York City during 2020, the park's construction was allowed to proceed even as most other projects were forced to stop. Work was temporarily halted for three weeks to disinfect the worksite, but the park was otherwise classified as an "essential project". Since most of the work was conducted outdoors, Little Island's construction site was considered a less likely place for COVID-19 to spread compared to indoor projects. The park's construction was nearly completed by early 2021.

== Operation ==
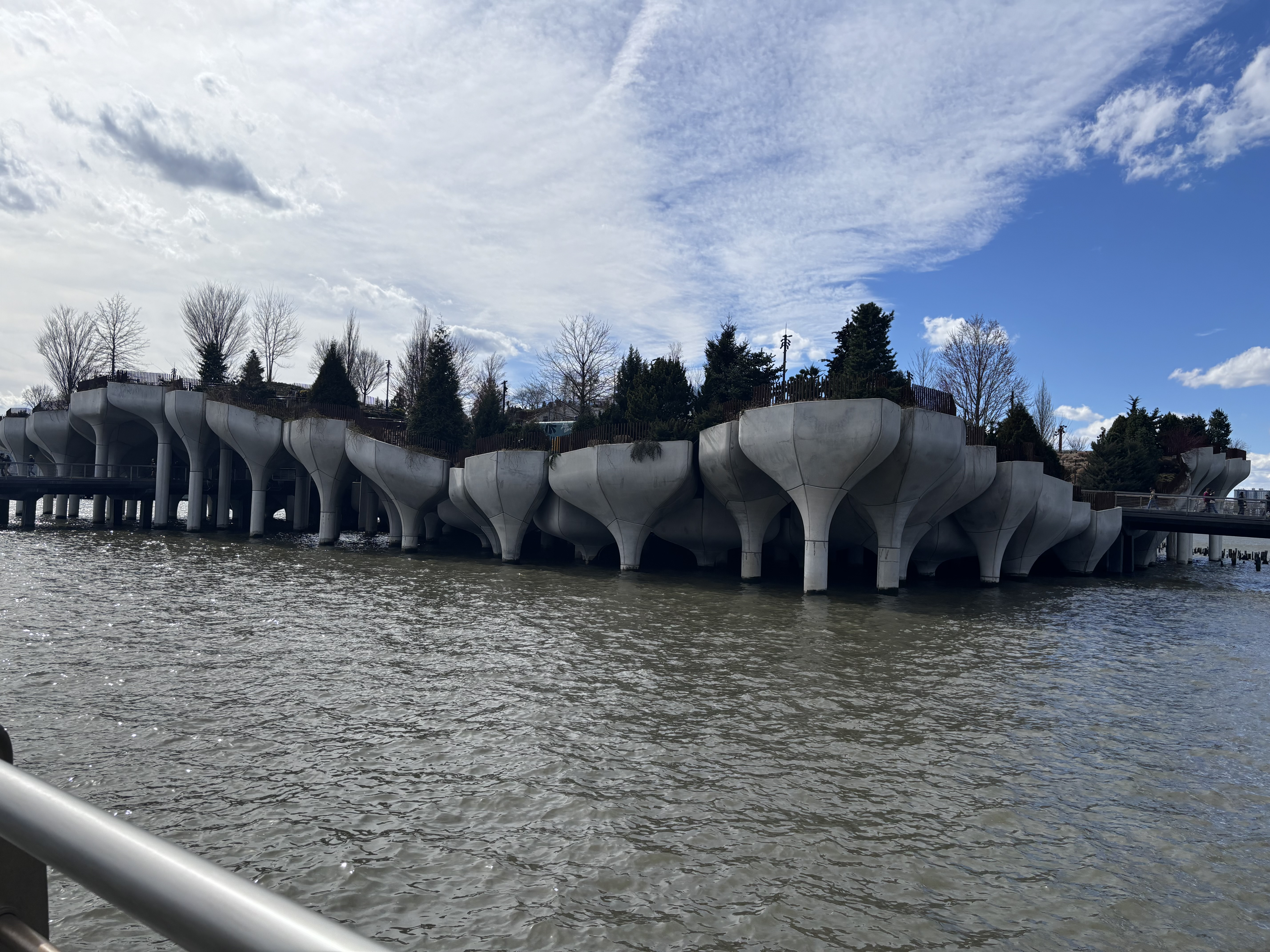
Little Island in March 2024

The idea of performances in the park was created midway through the park's development. Among the artistic advisors Diller hired were film director Stephen Daldry, playwright George Wolfe, and theater film producer Scott Rudin. In early 2021, Little Island's developers announced that the park would have a program of artists in residence. The first artists in residence were choreographer Ayodele Casel, and thespians Tina Landau, Michael McElroy, and the PigPen Theatre Company. The residencies had been planned before the COVID-19 pandemic, but because of restrictions that prevented indoor performances, Little Island's executive director Trish Santini said the artists' work was more important. The artists in residence were to work with the park's production team over a period of three years. Rudin continued to serve as an artistic advisor to Little Island even after allegations of abuse against him arose in early 2021.

The park officially opened on May 21, 2021. It ultimately cost $260 million to construct. Visitors were asked to book reservations if they wished to visit during the midday. The opening of the park coincided with the loosening of pandemic restrictions in New York City, and the resulting heavy traffic led the park's ticket website to crash. The Diller family foundation agreed to fund the upkeep of the park, including programming, for twenty years. According to Barry Diller, the foundation's total contribution to the park reaches an estimated figure of $380 million, of which the upkeep costs comprise $120 million.

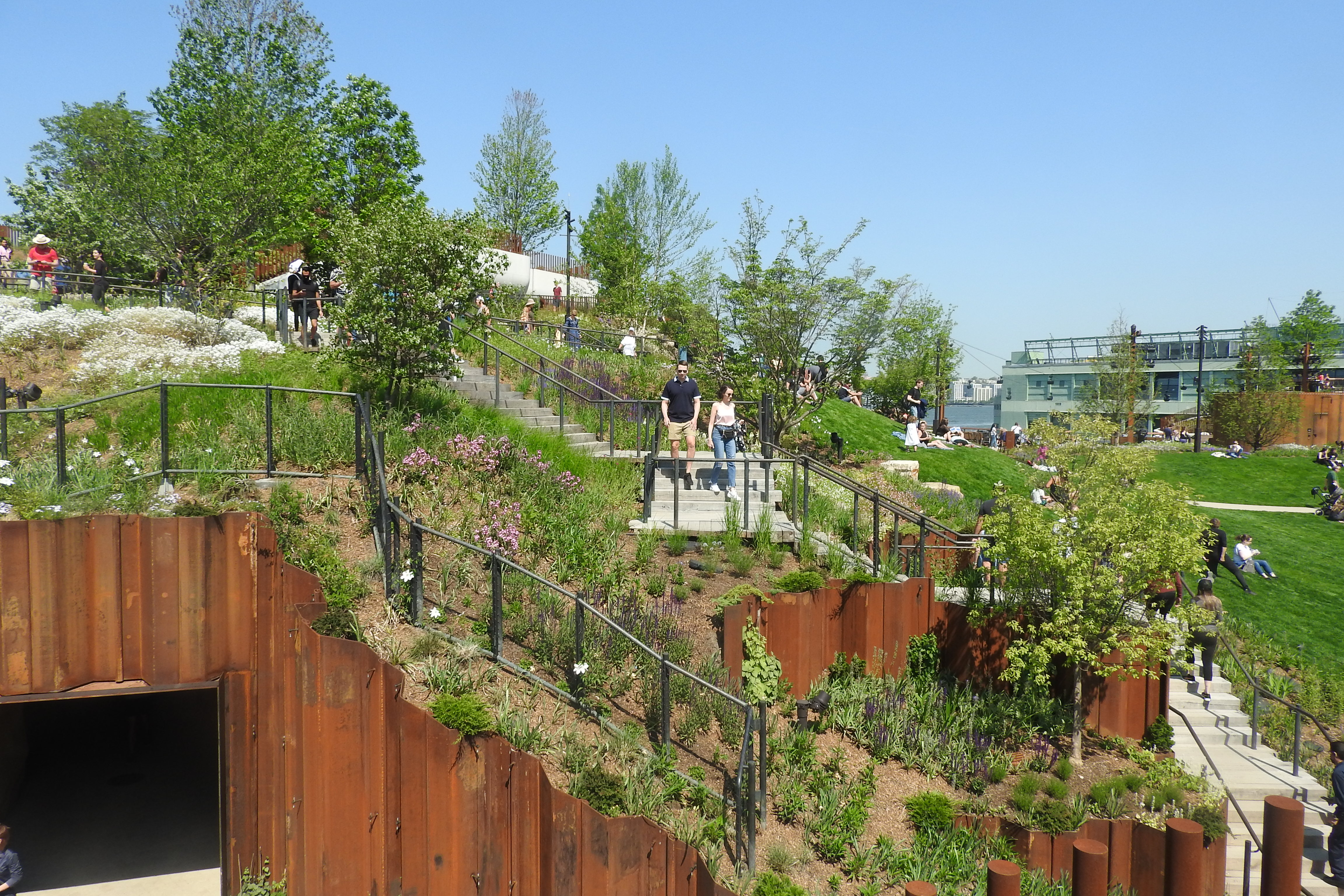
Entrance to the Amph at the southern end of the park

Acts scheduled for the Amph's opening season included the American Ballet Theatre. During its 2022 season, Little Island hosted a three-week performing-arts festival called The Big Mix. By 2023, the park had presented 572 shows and recorded over three million visitors. Little Island staff began focusing on creating entirely new shows for the park during the 2024 season; previously, the park's shows had been one-time performances and adaptations of existing shows. For the 2026 season, the number of summer performances declined significantly, as Diller wanted to change the types of programs being hosted at Little Island.

=== Reception ===
At the opening of the park, architecture critic Michael Kimmelman wrote for The New York Times that the design concept "is in the theatrical vein of 18th century English garden follies". Philip Kennicott of The Washington Post wrote that the park "discombobulates many of the ways in which the body physically adapts itself to the pulse of the city". Alexander Luckmann of Slate magazine described the concept of the park as beneficial but described its existence as being subject to the whims of wealthy backers, a sentiment also expressed by architecture critic Inga Saffron in The New Republic magazine.

== See also ==
- Hudson River Park, south of Little Island, which features Pier 51, a pier-turned-park
- Pier 57, a pier that features a park north of Little Island
