= PigPen Theatre Co. =

American indie folk band and theater company

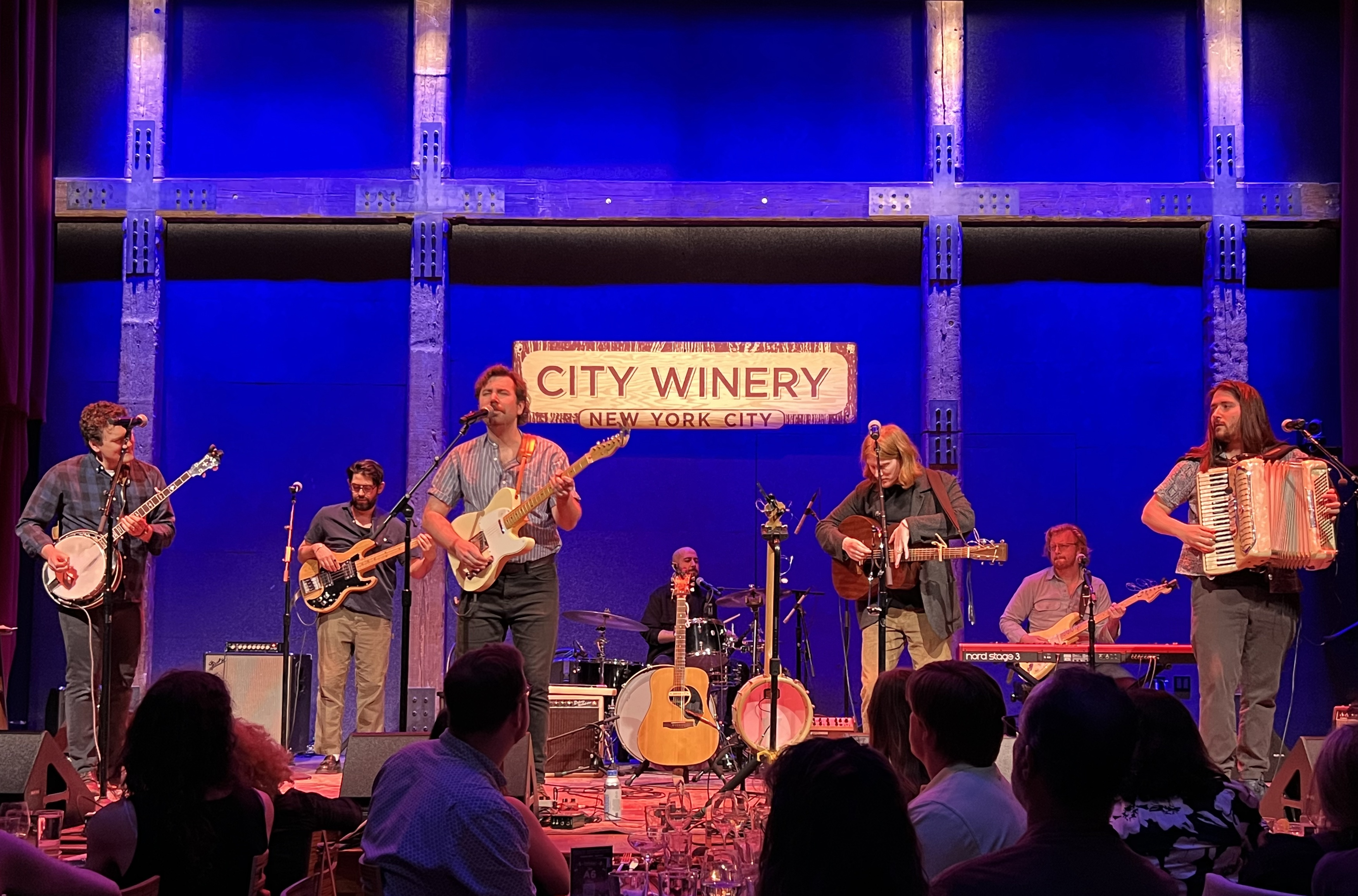
- PigPen Theatre Co. performing at City Winery in 2024

Background information
- Origin: Pittsburgh, Pennsylvania, U.S.
- Genre: Folk music
- Years active: 2007–present
- Members: Alex Falberg; Arya Shahi; Ben Ferguson; Curtis Gillen; Dan Weschler; Matt Nuernberger; Ryan Melia
- Website: pigpentheatre.com

PigPen Theatre Company (stylized as PigPen Theatre Co.) is a New York City-based indie folk band and theater company formed in 2007. As a band, the group writes, records, and tours music of the folk genre; as a theater company, the music is used to support original folk theatrical productions written and often performed by the members of the band themselves.

The band's theatrical work, which combines movement, puppetry, and music to tell original folk tales, has been described as "Once meets Peter and the Starcatcher" by BroadwayWorld. The members of the group cite The Decemberists, Anaïs Mitchell, Woody Guthrie, Forrest Gump, Neil Gaiman, and Jim Henson's The StoryTeller as among their influences.

== Background ==
The seven members of PigPen Theatre Co. first met as freshmen acting students at the Carnegie Mellon School of Drama in 2007. After working with each other in various classes, particularly movement and voice, the group decided to collaborate on a theater piece to present at the drama school's student-run theater festival Playground. The show, titled The Hunter and the Bear, was an original folk tale told through movement, music, and puppetry, and set the aesthetic for the group's projects moving forward. The production proved extremely popular, but the group did not seriously consider forming a theater company that could exist after graduation until they collaborated again for Playground the following year.

The group continued developing their plays, with plans to move to New York City as a collective theater company after graduation. During a residency in Martha's Vineyard in 2010, they were approached by a music executive who offered to help them also become a band after seeing one of their presentations. Prior to this, the company had only used original music as a "soundtrack" to support their works, but shifting to working as a band allowed them to focus more on individual songs, as well as the chance to increase their exposure by touring their music. Since then, the group has toured both their theatrical productions and recorded music as a band, with their debut album Bremen released in 2012. Recorded shortly after their graduation from Carnegie Mellon in 2011, Bremen consists of both music from their existing shows, as well as original songs. Bremen was acclaimed on release, with compliments to its layered harmonies and "Americana instrumentation" and comparisons made to British folk rock band Mumford & Sons. A second album, Whole Sun, followed in 2015. The group also have four EPs: The Courier's Wife, The Way I'm Running, PigPen Theatre Co. on Audiotree Live, and Out of the Overture.

== Works ==
=== Early productions ===
While still Carnegie Mellon students, the company presented their Playground 2010 piece The Nightmare Story as part of the New York International Fringe Festival (FringeNYC) in 2010, where it won the festival's Overall Excellence Award that year. The group were given the chance to present encore performances of The Nightmare Story after the festival at The Players Theatre and at La MaMa Experimental Theatre Club. They returned to FringeNYC the following year with The Mountain Song, which once again won the Overall Excellence Award. The Mountain Song was later presented at Company One in Boston from June 10 to 25, 2011. The production won the IRNE Award for Best Visiting Production. Following their graduation from Carnegie Mellon, the group revised The Nightmare Story for their first major New York City production in 2011 at the Irondale Center.

=== The Old Man and the Old Moon ===
The company's first full-scale production, The Old Man and the Old Moon debuted Off-Broadway at The Gym at Judson, running from October 4, 2012 to January 6, 2013, with previews beginning September 26. The production received rave reviews, with Ken Jaworowski of The New York Times naming it as Critic's Pick. The group revised the show in collaboration with director Stuart Carden for a new production that played at Williamstown Theatre Festival and later Writers Theatre in Glencoe, Illinois in 2013. The show returned to New York the following year at the New Victory Theater, once again to positive reviews. Further productions were staged by the band at the City Theatre in Pittsburgh and the Old Globe Theatre in San Diego.

=== The Hunter and the Bear ===
The Hunter and the Bear was the group's original collaboration, telling the story of a father searching for his son after a bear attack. First presented at Playground 2008, the group developed the show during their residency at Ars Nova and Manhattan Theatre Club. An expanded production, directed by Stuart Carden, was presented at Writers Theatre in 2016.

=== The Tale of Despereaux ===
The company's first licensed adaptation, The Tale of Despereaux adapts both the 2003 novel by Kate DiCamillo and subsequent film adaptation. The musical was first performed at the Old Globe Theatre in 2019 before a subsequent run at Berkeley Repertory Theatre, directed by the band in collaboration with Marc Bruni. The band starred as the various characters alongside Taylor Iman Jones and Eric Petersen.

=== Phantom Folktales ===
On March 13, 2019, Virgin Voyages announced that PigPen Theatre Co. would be a part of their Creative Collective in Entertainment, a group of artists that included Sam Pinkleton and Randy Weiner who would be responsible for creating entertainment for its fleet of ships. PigPen Theatre Co. created Phantom Folktales, a series of "song-driven micro-plays" designed to be performed around the ship. The band released the single "To The Sea" in 2019 to promote the show. Following delays caused by the pandemic, Phantom Folktales first played onboard the Scarlet Lady in 2021.

=== Water for Elephants ===
On March 26, 2018, PigPen Theatre Co. announced they would be collaborating with playwright Rick Elice on a musical adaptation of Water for Elephants by Sara Gruen. The musical premiered at the Alliance Theatre in Atlanta, Georgia, running from June 4-July 9, 2023. The musical opened on Broadway at the Imperial Theatre on March 21, 2024, with previews beginning February 24. The original Broadway cast includes Grant Gustin, Isabelle McCalla, Gregg Edelman, and Paul Alexander Nolan. To promote the musical, PigPen Theatre Co. released a music video of them performing a stripped-down version of the opening song "Anywhere."

== Other appearances ==
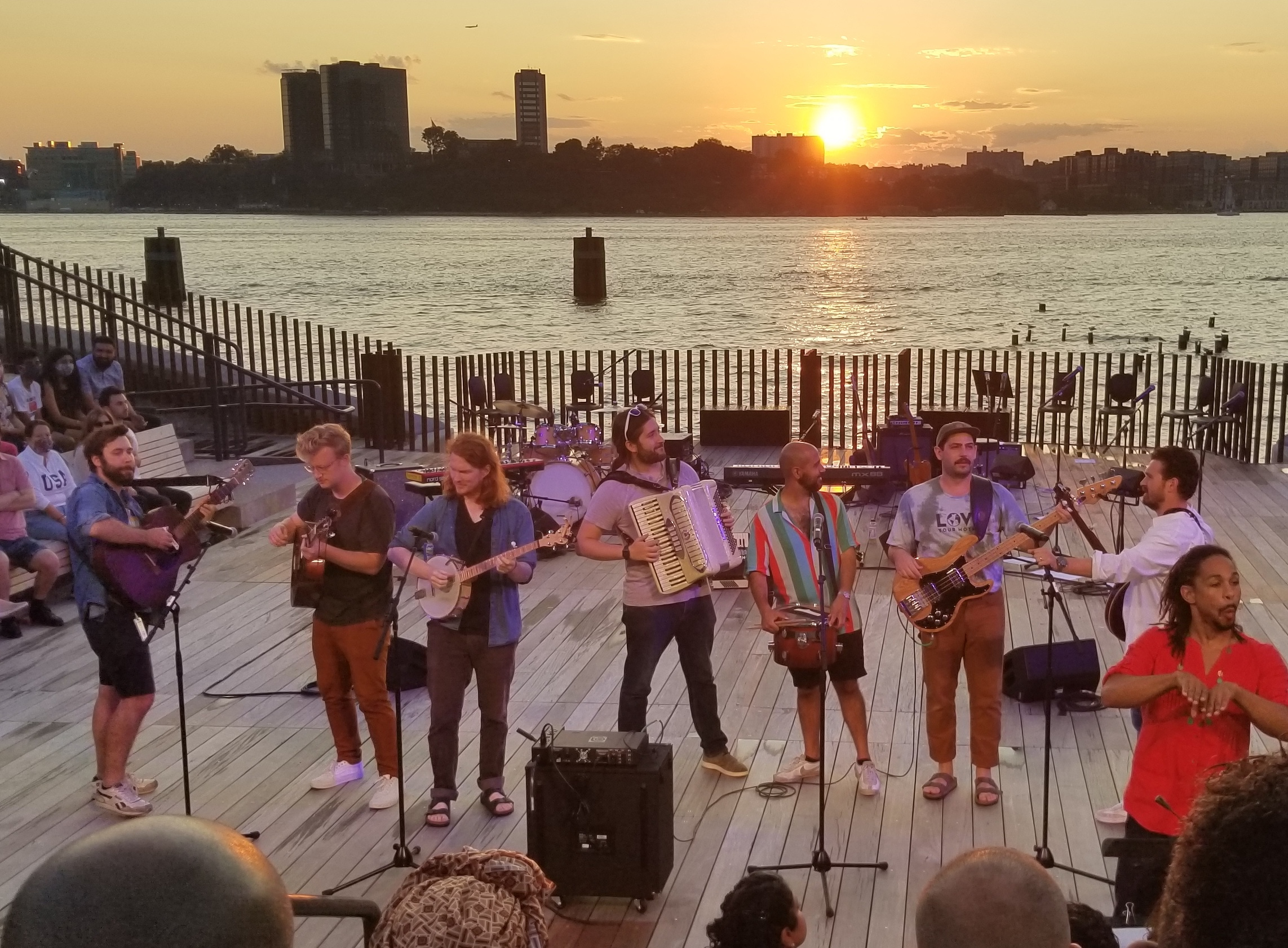
The band performing at the amphitheater on Little Island in 2021.

The group appeared at TEDx ColumbiaSIPA in 2013, where they explained their style and philosophy of storytelling, while also performing an excerpt of The Old Man and the Old Moon.

To promote the release of the album Bremen, the band created a music video for the title track in collaboration with Buffalo Picture House. The "Bremen" music video roughly depicts the story of their musical The Old Man and the Old Moon, with direction and animation by Brandon Roots and character design by Wylie Bickert.

In 2021, the band were announced as members of the inaugural cohort of resident artists for Little Island at Pier 55. As part of their residency, the band are responsible for curating the park's Storytelling Festival, as well as developing their own new work.

"Bremen" was featured as the "weather" on Episode 54 of the podcast Welcome to Night Vale in 2014.

The seven members appeared together in Trevor Nunn's production of Pericles, Prince of Tyre at Theatre for a New Audience in 2016, serving as both ensemble members and musicians for the production. They also cameo in the 2015 film Ricki and the Flash. In 2026, the band co-orchestrated and provided arrangements for the Kansas City Repertory Theatre production of The Wizard of Oz directed by frequent collaborator Stuart Carden, with several members appearing in the production in various roles.

Licensing rights for The Old Man and the Old Moon, The Mountain Song, and The Nightmare Story are available through Broadway Licensing.

== Members ==
- Alex Falberg - vocals, banjo
- Arya Shahi - vocals, percussion
- Ben Ferguson - vocals, guitar, banjo
- Curtis Gillen - vocals, guitar, bass guitar
- Dan Weschler - vocals, acoustic, piano, keyboard, accordion
- Matt Nuernberger - vocals, piano, guitar, percussion
- Ryan Melia - vocals, violin, banjo, guitar

The seven members of the band share songwriting duties, with much of their music born out of improvisation sessions that are then tied together and arranged by Dan Weschler; however, all music is credited to the company as a collective. Several members are multi-instrumentalists, often swapping instruments during performances of particular songs. All band members perform vocals; however lead vocal duties are generally performed by Ben Ferguson, Dan Weschler, and/or Ryan Melia.

== Discography ==
=== Albums ===
- Bremen (April 24, 2012)
- Whole Sun (July 7, 2015)

=== EPs ===
- The Courier's Wife (May 15, 2010)
- The Way I'm Running (October 8, 2013)
- PigPen Theatre Co. on AudioTree Live (April 11, 2014)
- Out of the Overture (January 7, 2026)

=== Singles ===
- "Father Hare" (December 12, 2012)
- "To The Sea" (February 18, 2019)
- "I'm over here are you there, too?" (May 1, 2020)
- "Learn To" (November 6, 2020)
- "A quiet Christmas song I would like my friends and family to hear if in the cruelest of circumstances I pass away on or around the Christmas holidays by perishing in the act of saving a burning bus of Dickensian orphans or something equally heroic" (December 18, 2020)
- "I Don't Wanna Leave" (February 5, 2021)
- "It'll Be A While" (May 7, 2021)
- "Have Yourself a Merry Little Christmas (Live!)" (December 24, 2021)
- "Witch of Canaan Valley" (October 9, 2026)
