= Water for Elephants =

Novel by Sara Gruen

- Author: Sara Gruen
- Cover artist: Charles Mason
- Language: English
- Genre: Historical romance novel
- Publisher: Algonquin Books of Chapel Hill
- Publication date: May 26, 2006
- Publication place: United States
- Media type: Print
- Pages: 331 (first edition)
- ISBN: 1-56512-499-5 (first edition)
- OCLC: 61362217
- Dewey Decimal: 813/.6 22
- LC Class: PS3607.R696 W38 2006

Water for Elephants is a 2006 historical romance novel by Canadian–American author Sara Gruen. The novel is set in a 20th-century circus. Gruen wrote the book as part of the National Novel Writing Month.

A film adaptation was released in 2011, while a stage musical began presentations in 2023 and opened on Broadway in spring 2024.

== Plot ==
The story is told through a series of memories by Jacob Jankowski, a man living in a nursing home who can't remember if he is 90 or 93 years old. In the nursing home, Jacob's life lacks excitement. He gets visited every Sunday by one of his five children and has good rapport with a kind nurse named Rosemary, but for the most part, Jacob's a tired old man whose life is highly regimented and scheduled. This all changes, however, when the circus parks right outside of the nursing home window, igniting Jacob's memories of his time working with the Benzini Brothers Most Spectacular Show on Earth.

As his memories begin, Jacob is a 23-year-old Polish American preparing for his final exams as a Cornell University veterinary student when he receives the devastating news that both of his parents have died in a car accident. Jacob's father was a veterinarian and Jacob had planned to join his practice in Norwich, New York. When Jacob learns that his parents' home has been mortgaged to pay for his tuition and that his father's practice will not become his own, he has an emotional breakdown and leaves his Ivy League school just short of graduation.

In the dark of night, Jacob jumps on a train, later learning it is a circus train belonging to the Benzini Brothers Most Spectacular Show on Earth. On the train Jacob is befriended by Camel, an old man and circus veteran, who persuades his companions not to throw Jacob off the train. Camel takes him under his wing and is able to find him odd menial jobs. When the owner of the circus, Alan J. Bunkel, "Uncle Al," learns of Jacob's training as a vet, he is hired to care for the circus animals. This leads Jacob to share quarters with a little person named Walter (who is known as Kinko to the circus) and his Jack Russell Terrier, Queenie. A few weeks later Jacob is summoned to examine Camel, who, after drinking "Jake" (adulterated Jamaican ginger extract) for many years, is unable to move his arms or legs. Fearing Camel will be "red-lighted" (thrown off a moving train as punishment or as severance from the circus to avoid paying wages), Jacob hides him in his room.

The equestrian director, August Rosenthul, is a brutal man who abuses the animals in his care (such as the new elephant, Rosie) and the people around him, though he can also be charming and generous. Jacob develops a guarded relationship with August and his wife, Marlena, with whom Jacob eventually falls in love. August is suspicious of their relationship and physically assaults both Marlena and Jacob. Marlena subsequently leaves August and stays at a hotel while she is not performing. Uncle Al then informs Jacob that August has paranoid schizophrenia and utters a threat: reunite August and Marlena as a happily married couple or Walter and Camel get red-lighted.

A few days later, after discovering that August has tried to see Marlena, Jacob visits her in her hotel room. After he comforts her, they end up making love, and soon declare their love for each other. Marlena then returns to the circus to perform (and have secret meetings with Jacob), but refuses to allow August near her, which makes Uncle Al furious. Not long after her return to the circus, Marlena discovers that she is pregnant.

One night Jacob climbs up and jumps each train car, while the train is moving, to August's room, carrying a knife between his teeth intending to kill August. However, Jacob backs out, leaving the knife on August's pillow to send a message. When Jacob returns to his train car, he finds that no one is there, except for Queenie. He then realizes that Walter and Camel were red-lighted and that he was also supposed to have been too.

As the story climaxes, several circus workers who were red-lighted come back and release the animals, causing a stampede during the performance.

In the ensuing panic, Rosie (the elephant that August abused) takes a stake and drives it into August's head. August's body is then trampled in the stampede. During the ensuing melee Jacob was the only person who witnessed what truly happened to August. As a result of this incident, the Benzini Brothers circus is shut down. Soon after, Uncle Al's corpse is found with a makeshift garrote around his neck, though it is unclear whether he was murdered or committed suicide. Marlena and Jacob leave, taking with them a number of the circus animals including Rosie, Queenie, and Marlena's horses. Jacob and Marlena begin their life together by joining the Ringling Bros. Circus. Later, Jacob becomes the chief veterinarian at the Brookfield Zoo in Chicago, where they settled.

The story then comes back to Jacob in the nursing home. Jacob is waiting for one of his children to take him to the circus. It is revealed that Jacob and Marlena married and had five children, spending the first seven years with Ringling before Jacob got a job as a vet for the Brookfield Zoo. Marlena is revealed to have died a few years before Jacob was put into the nursing home. After finding out no one is coming for him, Jacob makes his way to the circus next to the nursing home on his own. He meets the manager, Charlie, and, after the performance, Jacob begs to be allowed to stay with the circus, selling tickets. Charlie agrees, and Jacob believes that he has finally come home.

== Concept ==
Gruen has said that the backbone of her story parallels the biblical story of Jacob in the Book of Genesis.

=== Title ===
In the beginning of the novel, Jacob mocks another nursing home resident who claims to have worked in the circus and carried the water for the elephants. The circus train only had a limited amount of water on board, and elephants can drink between 100 and 300 litres per day (approximately 26–80 gallons).

In a later flashback to Jacob's younger years, Jacob is brought to Uncle Al, the manager of the circus, who taunts him by asking, "You want to carry water for elephants, I suppose?"

== Awards and nominations ==
- 2006 Quill Award nominee for General Fiction
- 2007 Alex Awards selection
- Entertainment Weekly Best Novel of 2006 nominee
- New York Times Best Seller list for 12 weeks in 2006 (peaked at No. 7 on August 20, 2006)
- Book Sense No. 1 pick for June 2006
- Winner of the 2007 BookBrowse award for most popular book
- The paperback hit No. 1 on the New York Times Best Seller list on July 8, 2007

== Banning ==
In August 2024 the book was banned by the Katy Independent School District in Texas. In Utah, the book was banned by the Davis School District in July 2024, the Tooele County School District in January 2025, and the Cache County School District on April 28, 2025. Under Utah state law, the banning of the book by three districts qualifies it for removal from all Utah school districts and charter schools.

== Release ==
- 2006, USA, Algonquin Books of Chapel Hill, a division of Workman Publishing, ISBN 1-56512-499-5, Pub date May 26, 2006, Hardback
- 2006, USA, Thorndike Press, ISBN 0-7862-9027-7, Pub date December 15, 2006, Large print hardback
- 2007, USA, Algonquin Books of Chapel Hill, a division of Workman Publishing, ISBN 1-56512-560-6, Pub date May 1, 2007, Paperback
- 2006, USA, Highbridge Audio, ISBN 1-59887-062-9, Pub date June 1, 2006, Audiobook

== Film adaptation ==
A film adaptation produced by Flashpoint Entertainment and Fox 2000 Pictures was released in theaters on April 22, 2011. The film was directed by Francis Lawrence, and starred Robert Pattinson as Jacob Jankowski, Reese Witherspoon as Marlena, and Christoph Waltz as August. Hal Holbrook played the older Jacob Jankowski. Other cast members include Mark Povinelli as Kinko/Walter, Jim Norton as Camel, James Frain as Rosie's caretaker, Ken Foree as Earl, and Paul Schneider as Charlie O'Brien. The character of "Uncle Al" was removed, and instead August is both the owner and animal trainer.

The film featured the Tennessee Valley Railroad Museum No. 610 and former McCloud River Railroad No. 18., built in 1914. It was filmed in Ventura County, California; Georgia; and Chattanooga, Tennessee.

== Musical adaptation ==
A musical adaptation of the novel with a book by Rick Elice and music and lyrics by PigPen Theatre Co. premiered at the Alliance Theatre in June 2023. It was announced on September 12, 2023 that the musical would begin previews on Broadway at the Imperial Theatre on February 24, 2024 with an opening night set for March 21. The cast will include Grant Gustin as Jacob, Isabelle McCalla as Marlena, Gregg Edelman as Mr. Jankowski, and Paul Alexander Nolan as August.
