= Ape House =

Book by Sara Gruen

- First edition (publ. Bond Street Books)
- Author: Sara Gruen
- Publisher: Spiegel & Grau
- Publication date: September 7, 2010
- ISBN: 978-0-385-52321-9

Ape House is a 2010 novel by Sara Gruen. It received generally mixed reviews.

== Plot ==
A group of reporters visit the Great Ape Language Lab - a laboratory where bonobos are trained to communicate with humans by using American Sign Language and computer software to communicate with the scientist involved. Perhaps the most amazing phenomenon is that the bonobos actually want to communicate with humans, so much so that they pass it down to their young. But soon after the reporters leave, the lab is blown up, with the bonobos and a scientist (Isabel Duncan) inside. Isabel is badly injured and taken to a hospital. The bonobos escape from the lab only to be sold to a man named Ken Faulks. He is a famous for making pornography and devises a plan to put the apes on the air, in a show called Ape House. When Isabel discovers the bonobos' predicament, she travels to Lizard, New Mexico, where Ape House is shooting. In order to free the apes from these horrendous conditions, Isabel joins forces with journalist, John Thigpen. The two work to free the apes and get them back "home."

== Summary ==
People conduct language studies with six bonobos at the Great Ape Language Lab. Scientist Isabel Duncan and journalist John Thigpen are at the core of the novel as the main characters. John was sent to write a report about on the ape lab, but he gets involved significantly after the lab is blown up by a bomb and the animals go missing. He discovers that a reality television show is airing called Ape House which the apes are a part of. Isabel and John team up to save the apes and are helped by a variety of colorful characters.

== Reception ==
The novel received generally mixed reviews, with the Los Angeles Times, The New York Times, Entertainment Weekly, and The Washington Post, all finding the novel flawed, especially in comparison to Gruen's earlier work. There were some very positive reviews, particularly one from The Dallas Morning News.

== See also ==
- Great ape language
