= Sara Gruen =

Canadian-American author

- Born: 1969 (age 56–57); Vancouver, British Columbia, Canada
- Education: Carleton University
- Occupation: Novelist
- Website: saragruen.com

Sara Gruen (born 1969 in Vancouver) is a Canadian-American author. She is a 2007 recipient of the Alex Award for young adult literature.

== Early life and education ==
Gruen was born in Vancouver, British Columbia. She grew up in London, Ontario. She has claimed that at age 15, she was left to survive as street urchin. She attended Carleton University in Ottawa and graduated with a degree in English literature. She continued to live in Ottawa for 10 years after graduation.

== Career ==
Gruen moved to the United States from Ottawa in 1999 for a technical writing job. When she was laid off two years later, she decided to try writing fiction. Gruen is an animal lover; both her first novel, Riding Lessons, and her second novel, Flying Changes, involve horses. Gruen's third book, the 1930s circus drama Water for Elephants (2006), was initially turned down by her publisher at the time, Avon Books; as a result, Gruen found another publisher, Algonquin Books of Chapel Hill. It went on to become a New York Times bestseller and is now available in 45 languages and as a 2011 film adaptation starring Reese Witherspoon, Christoph Waltz, and Robert Pattinson. Water for Elephants has been turned into a musical and opened on Broadway in March 2024 after playing at Atlanta's Alliance Theatre in 2023. Her fourth novel, Ape House, centers around the Bonobo ape and was sold to Spiegel & Grau based on a 12-page summary. Ape House is published by Two Roads Books. Her fifth novel, At the Water's Edge, was published in 2015.

Gruen's work often involves animals, and she supports charitable organizations that support animals and wildlife.

== Awards ==
Gruen's awards include being the BookSense #1 pick for June 2006, the Book Sense Book of the Year Award for Fiction 2007, the Cosmo Fun Fearless Fiction Award 2007, the BookBrowse Diamond Award Best Book 2006, the Great Lakes Book Award for Fiction 2007, the Midwest Booksellers' Choice Award for fiction, the ALA/Alex Award 2007, the Carl Sandburg Award, 21st Century Fiction, 2007, and the Friends of American Literature Adult Fiction Award. Additionally, she was a 2006 Quill Award nominee for General Fiction, and a nominee for the Entertainment Weekly Best Novel of 2006. She also received a Doctorate of Humane Letters, Causa Honoris, from Wittenberg University.

== Involvement with the Charles Murdoch case ==
In June 2015, Gruen received a letter from Charles Murdoch, an inmate at a California prison. Murdoch is serving a life sentence without parole for murder. His letter praised Water for Elephants and also described the circumstances of his case. He told Gruen that former chief justice Alex Kozinski of the U.S. Court of Appeals for the Ninth Circuit "described my (wrongful) conviction as 'a truly spectacular miscarriage of justice.'" Murdoch's conviction was upheld by the California Court of Appeal despite Kozinski's doubts that he had received a fair trial. Gruen began to correspond with Murdoch and took up the cause of attempting to overturn his conviction, believing Murdoch's prosecution to have depended on a coerced confession by witness Dino Dinardo. She hired attorneys and investigators at her own expense, including former Los Angeles District Attorney's Office prosecutor Robin Sax, eventually spending more than half a million dollars on her fight to free Murdoch. Despite her efforts, Murdoch remains incarcerated, waiting for a response from the Los Angeles County's Conviction Review Unit.

In Gruen's own words, the effort to exonerate Murdoch has left her "absolutely broke", as she borrowed money against her home, and "seriously ill", with her writing work "years past deadline". Fearful of threats to her life, she left her home in the spring 2018 and moved repeatedly to avoid being tracked, though she eventually returned to Asheville.

== Personal life ==
Gruen lives in Asheville, North Carolina with her husband, the youngest of her three sons, and numerous pets, including horses Tia and Fancy.
