= One Thousand Children =

Children fleeing the Holocaust to America (1934-1945)

The One Thousand Children (OTC) is a designation, created in 2000, which is used to refer to the approximately 1,400 Jewish children who were rescued from Nazi Germany and other Nazi-occupied or threatened European countries, and who were taken directly to the United States during the period 1934–1945. The phrase "One Thousand Children" only refers to those children who went to the US unaccompanied. In nearly all cases, their parents were not able to escape with their children, because they could not get the necessary visas among other reasons. Later, nearly all these parents were killed by the Nazis.

The United States Holocaust Memorial Museum (USHMM), in its online "Holocaust Encyclopedia," in the article on "Immigration of Refugee Children to the United States," recognizes the name "One Thousand Children" for this group of children.

The archives of the "One Thousand Children," contain documentary material, including audio and video of the One Thousand Children 2002 Conference, and individual interviews of OTC children, as well as other original materials, held at the YIVO Institute.

The OTC children were rescued by United States and European organizations, as well as by individuals.

Originally only about one thousand such children had been identified as OTC children — hence the name "The One Thousand Children". By 2017 about 1,400 had been identified.

The One Thousand Children, Inc. (OTC, Inc.) was an organization created for further welfare of the OTC children.

== Definition and early history ==
Some 1.5 million children, nearly all of them Jewish, were killed by the Nazis in the Holocaust. This includes those who died of starvation, or illness due to inhumane conditions in the ghettos.

A small number of Jewish children were saved by being hidden, in or close to their Nazi-occupied hometown (see Hidden Children).

A small number of Jewish children were also saved by being moved to non-Nazi-occupied lands through a number of programs. In western Europe these would include the Kindertransport program which included the individual efforts of Sir Nicholas Winton; and the work of the French Jewish organization Œuvre de Secours aux Enfants (OSE). Most such programs that worked specifically to save children had the children remain within Western Europe.

Other well organized programs prepared and sent children to Palestine, for example Youth Aliyah, Youth village and Sh'erit ha-Pletah.

In the One Thousand Children "program", approximately 1,400 children, nearly all Jewish, were taken to the United States.

In general, they were brought in quiet operations designed to avoid negative attention from isolationist and other antisemitic forces. Originally 1,177 such children had been identified as OTC — hence the name the "One Thousand Children" (OTC).

These OTC children generally:

- came from Europe directly to the United States during the period 1934 to 1945;
- were of age up to sixteen the cut-off age before they were considered adults, with the youngest being fourteen months old;
- arrived unaccompanied; and
- were placed with foster families, schools and other facilities across the U.S. However some came under individual arrangements with various final arrangements.

The OTC history is divided into four periods:

- the first: 1934, until Kristallnacht on November 9/10, 1938 – during which there were very few OTC;
- second: starting with Kristallnacht November 9/10, 1938, which had strongly alerted the American public to the oppression of the Jews in Germany, until the outbreak of the European War on September 1, 1939;
- third: September 1, 1939 until Pearl Harbor December 7, 1941, during the period while Europe was at war but the United States was officially neutral, until Pearl Harbor December 7, 1941, when the United States joined the war. This was a period when travel from all of Europe to the neutral United States was still permitted, but only if one could obtain the required travel documents; and
- fourth: December 7, 1941 until Victory in Europe May 8, 1945. During this period the United States and Germany were at war, so that legal travel from the Nazi-occupied lands to the United States was not available.

The first small group of six children arrived at New York City in November 1934. This was followed by subsequent small groups, totaling about 100 children annually, that occurred in the early years of operation, and they were taken to foster homes arranged through appeals to congregations and other organizations' members.

Most of the children came through programs run by private refugee agencies such as the German Jewish Children's Aid (GJCA), the Hebrew Immigrant Aid Society (HIAS), the American Jewish Joint Distribution Committee (colloquially known as "the Joint"), HICEM and the Society of Friends (the Quakers). Many of these efforts were combined to form the U.S. Committee for the Care of European Children (USCOM) which was registered with the US government and later became part of the National War Fund. Fundraising efforts were assisted by the American Jewish Committee, the American Jewish Congress, and the National Council of Jewish Women.

Many of the OTC were initially gathered together, supported, taken care of, and educated by the French Oeuvre de Secours aux Enfants (OSE), sometimes for many months in the OSE "chateaux" (these were typically very large houses and grounds). They stayed with OSE until OSE was able to pass them on to "the Joint", or the Quakers, which then took them to the United States. Under the leadership of Andree Salomon, OSE gathered about 350 such children in three large groups, who traveled to the United States with the aid of the organizations mentioned. Many of these children came from the Gurs internment camp.

Other OTC came under private arrangements and sponsorship, typically made by the parent(s) with a family relative or friend. Such children would live with their sponsor, or sometimes live in a boarding school in close contact with their sponsor.

Before 1938, only small groups were brought into the country by such organizations, because of concern for antisemitism and social hostility to allowing foreigners to enter the U.S. during the Depression. The sponsoring organizations wanted to avoid drawing undue attention to the children. Furthermore, their immigration was limited by the U.S. immigration quota system for their countries of origin.

The demand on these organizations increased markedly after Kristallnacht on November 9/10, 1938 convinced more European parents that the destruction of Jews was an element of the Nazi agenda.

In the later period of 1941–1942, when news of Nazi atrocities was more widely circulated, larger groups of OTC were organized and arrived in the U.S. A few of the OTC came under the British Children's Overseas Reception Board (CORB) program, as well as the "U.S. Committee for the Care of European Children" (USCOM).

In the OTC programs under the Hebrew Immigrant Aid Society (HIAS), German Jewish Children's Aid Society, (GJCA), the Quakers, etc., foster families in the U.S. agreed to care for the children until age twenty-one, see that they were educated, and provided a guarantee that they would not become public charges. Most of these children were assigned a social worker from a local social service agency to oversee the child's resettlement process. Jewish children were generally placed in Jewish homes. These children, and their sponsors, expected that they would be reunited with their own families at the end of the war. Most of the children lost one or both parents, and most of their extended families, by the time World War II had ended.

== Where the Children Came From, And Some of Their Journeys ==
Most of the OTC children came from Germany, Austria, and Czechoslovakia. Some came from France, Belgium, Holland and Luxembourg. Very few came directly from Eastern Europe. However, some families of OTC had previously made it from Eastern to Western Europe; and then the OTC child fled from Western Europe. For instance, this was the case for Wulf Wolodia Grajonca, who later became the "rock-and-roll" impresario Bill Graham (promoter).

Before the war, many managed to get to Hamburg or another port, and sail from there.

After the German blitzkrieg of May 1940 through Belgium, Holland, and Luxembourg, and into France, many OTC children fled from Occupied France or Vichy France by going south and west to the Spanish border. Then they made the climb over the Pyrenees, usually guided by a passeur guide/smuggler. From Spain, they traveled to neutral Portugal and Lisbon. From there, they sailed to the United States, often on one of the Portuguese liners Serpa Pinto (also known as the RMS Ebro), or Mouzinho, or Nyassa.

Other OTC children traveled to Casablanca, and sailed from there.

Some French intact families followed a trajectory that led them to one of the French concentration camps such as Gurs. Then OSE was able to extract the child(ren) from that camp, but with the parents still interned. Then OSE would aid the child(ren) over the next OTC stages to their final transport across the Atlantic. In the later stages of this journey, often HIAS, or the "Joint" would also assist the OTC children.

A group of about 6-8 unaccompanied Jewish children fled to the United States from Venezuela. Their parents, in the small Jewish community of Maracaibo in Venezuela, were well aware of Hitler's possible global threat, which included German submarines off the Venezuelan coast.

There were around 400 people who survived concentration camps, like the Hungarian Eva Szepesi. These were also labeled child survivors.

== The "OTC" Children ==
For many of the OTC children, the period before they reached the United States was very difficult. Before World War II, most were simply assembled by rescue agencies directly from their home towns in Germany and Austria, and then easily escorted to the United States. But after the war started, nearly all of them went through extreme hardships and dangers before they boarded ship for the United States. Some did travel to the port with parents, but many traveled alone, at least for part of their flight. Some were smuggled over the Pyrenees (usually with their parents). Some were incarcerated for a time in concentration camps such as Gurs internment camp in southern France, while some spent time in a French "château" (large mansion) run by the Œuvre de Secours aux Enfants or OSE.

Some of the OTC children came by individual arrangements made by their family, in which the child would be sent into the care of a relative in America. In America, they would either live with that family, or perhaps be placed in a boarding school.

Many OTC children made notable contributions to American society. Among them are:

- One OTC (and Kindertransport) child, Jack Steinberger, became a Nobel Laureate in physics. His experiment, done with two others, clarified the understanding of fundamental elementary particle physics at the time.
- Another OTC child, Ambassador Richard Schifter, during World War II and shortly afterwards, was one of the Ritchie Boys. The Ritchie Boys were a unit of the U.S. Army, who were chosen because of their excellent language skills in German, French, etc., and were trained in military intelligence at Fort Ritchie. They then operated primarily in interrogation on the battlefield during World War II. There were about 20,000, of whom about 2,000 were German or Austrian refugees to America. Several OTC children became Ritchie Boys, or served in the Armed Forces. After his Ritchie Boy stint, Ambassador Schifter had a very significant diplomatic and legal career, and was the U.S. Ambassador for Human Relations at the United Nations. As a child in Austria, his father told him that no Jew could become an Ambassador (in Austria). Schifter did become an American Ambassador to the United Nations, but his father had been already killed by the Nazis.
- Another child Wulf Wolodia Grajonca renamed himself Bill Graham and became a concert promoter and music venue operator in the rock music and psychedelic rock scene in San Francisco. Bill Graham was the promoter for the musical groups Grateful Dead and Jefferson Airplane. He operated the Fillmore East, Fillmore West, The Fillmore and Winterland Ballroom rock music venues, and organized the large Summer Jam at Watkins Glen and US Festival events before his death in a helicopter crash in 1991. He was posthumously inducted into the Rock and Roll Hall of Fame in 1992.
- Henri Parens became a child psychiatrist, and wrote several professional books that presented methods he had developed to help children who had been traumatized, such as OTC children. He made use of his own OTC experience at ages 11–12, and subsequently. In his autobiographical book "Renewal of Life: Healing from the Holocaust", Parens presents his feelings and emotions during his OTC experiences and his later slow "healing."
- Herbert Freudenberger, a psychologist and author of the book "Burn-out: The High Cost of High Achievement" (1980)
- Arthur Hans Weiss, one of the Ritchie Boys. As a United States military counter intelligence figure, who found Adolf Hitler's last will and political testament in autumn 1945. He later became a lawyer.
- Guy Stern (born Günther Stern) was one of the Ritchie Boys, like Ambassador Schifter (above). He then had a career as a university professor and Holocaust Museum director.
- Harry Eckstein (born Horst Eckstein) became a political science professor at Princeton University and the University of California, Irvine.

== Emotional and Practical Effects ==
At the time, the OTC children went through much emotional stress and trauma and practical difficulties in Europe before their arrival in America, also during their initial period in America, and even in later war-time years. At war's end, most OTC children would learn that their parents had been killed by the Nazis. At that time, they had to adjust to, and create for themselves, another new set of life experiences. Such experiences continue to create conscious and unconscious trauma, and their repercussions, for many years.

These OTC trauma, both at the time and afterwards, are similar to those met by other Child Holocaust Survivors who survived in Europe. The OTC child's situation in the United States was very different than that of a child who remained in Europe, but it was equally damaging to his childhood development. These trauma were different and more extreme than those of an adult Holocaust survivor.

Like other child Holocaust survivors, the experiences and psychological trauma received by the OTC Child Survivors differed fundamentally, crucially and negatively from that of an adult Holocaust survivor.

Not surprisingly, some of the OTC children became angry with their situation. Some would act out, sometimes so much so that their "foster-parents" decided they had to return the OTC child to the original Organization, such as HIAS, to be placed elsewhere.

As an example, one OTC child, Phyllis Helene Mattson, also acted out at the "Orphanage" Institution, where twice she had to be placed – she ultimately stayed with four "foster-families," and was in the "Orphanage" twice. She ran away from two of her "foster-families," and one "foster-family" sent her back to the "Orphanage." As she herself writes, it is somewhat remarkable that she managed to become a responsible mature adult. She recounts all this in her book "War Orphan in San Francisco".

Nearly every OTC child arrived in America not being able to speak English, and so would be held behind in school grade placement (though most rapidly learned English and then advanced rapidly into their proper school-grade).

=== Emotional Trauma Continued After The War Was Over ===
Like other Holocaust child survivors, after the war the OTC child had traumatic life adjustments to make. Their parents had nearly certainly been killed by the Nazis, when they were still a young child, which they either learned soon after the war ended - or no information was available, and then they could hope that their parents were still alive, and fear that they were dead.

== Descriptions: Holocaust Child Survivors, Hidden Children, OTC, Kindertransport ==
=== Hidden Children of the Holocaust; OTC as Holocaust Child Survivors ===
Hidden Children of the Holocaust are those children who were hidden in some way during the Holocaust from the Nazis in occupied Europe, hidden so as to avoid capture by the Nazis.

One sub-group even of Hidden Children are children who, during the Holocaust, were placed into the care of a "foster-family," usually Catholic, and raised as-if one of the family.

These Hidden Children were saved from being killed by the Nazis. Nonetheless, all of them, including those in "foster-families," suffered great trauma at the time, and also later both consciously and subconsciously.

OTC children went through trauma, both in terms of the psychological and the practical – caused by the Holocaust. These trauma in large part correspond to many aspects of those trauma developed by the "foster-family" sub-group of the Hidden Children – child survivors who had been raised as-if one of a (generally Catholic) family. The OTC trauma similarly was caused by the Holocaust.

=== "American Kindertransport" ===
The OTC are the "American Kindertransport." The Kindertransport Program is discussed in more detail in a later section. Here, we only need to know that, during the period between Kristallnacht and the start of World War II, the Kindertransport Program brought about 10,000 Jewish children to England from Germany, German-annexed Austria, and German-occupied Czechoslovakia - but the children (kinder) had been forced to flee by themselves, and forced to leave their parents behind. (Nearly all the children's parents were later killed by the Nazis.)

In November 2018, the German Government announced a "Kindertransport Fund" that would pay each surviving Kindertransport "child" a token symbolic amount of 2,500 Euros (about $2,850 at that time). This was intended to be in recognition of the especial trauma these Kindertransport had suffered as children during their flight from Hitler, but that they had had to flee unaccompanied, and forced to leave their parents behind. The German Government created this Fund precisely to recognize that the Kinder were Child Survivors of the Holocaust.

The OTC as children suffered exactly the same trauma as did the kinder.

== Research and discovery ==
The fact that some unaccompanied children fled from Europe directly to the U.S.A. was first researched by Judith Baumel-Schwartz in a doctoral thesis and related book.

However, only in 2000 did Iris Posner have the realization and then implement it, that these children should be considered a significant distinct group of Holocaust Survivors, which should be discussed in the truly public domain.

Specifically, in 2000, Iris Posner had learned of the British Government-assisted Kindertransport effort, and was intrigued by the question of whether there was a similar actual official American Government effort. Posner wrote letters to newspapers asking any such children to contact her. Posner and Leonore Moskowitz also researched ship manifests and other documents. In this way, Posner "created" the story of this group of unaccompanied children to America ("The One Thousand Children," as she later named them). At that time, they managed to identify slightly over 1,000, hence the name. Posner and Moskowitz managed to locate about 500 of these who were still alive, and invited each of them to the 2002 OTC Conference.

Soon after, in 2001, Posner and Moskowitz jointly founded the non-profit organization The One Thousand Children, Inc.

Posner and Moskowitz, under the aegis of their organization "The One Thousand Children, Inc" organized a three-day International OTC Conference and Reunion in Chicago in 2002. Approximately 200 attendees had the opportunity to listen and interact with over 50 speakers drawn from OTC children, their children and grandchildren, and "foster" family members and rescuers from rescue organizations.

At the time of the Conference in 2002, they had found the names of about 1,200 OTC'ers. Since that time the known number has increased to about 1,400.

== American "Response" ==
The OTC story is unlike that of the kindertransport in which unaccompanied children came from mainland Europe to Great Britain. In contrast to the OTC 'program," the British kindertransport program was officially created by the British Government in very speedy response to kristallnacht on Nov 9/10, 1938. Within six days the British Government presented an official bill in Parliament which was rapidly passed, which waived all immigration and visa requirements for unaccompanied children, though it left actual arrangements to private relief organizations and individual sponsors.

In contrast, the United States did not change any immigration laws. In 1939, the proposed Wagner–Rogers Bill to admit 20,000 Jewish refugees under the age of 14 to the United States from Nazi Germany, co‑sponsored by Sen. Robert F. Wagner (D-N.Y.) and Rep. Edith Rogers (R-Mass.), failed to get Congressional approval. Jewish organizations did not challenge this decision. The full story of the failure of the Wagner-Rogers bill shows the power of the isolationist forces at that time, which included "an undercurrent of resentment toward Jews". Even the Ickes plan for settling Jews in Alaska, known as the Slattery Report, did not come to any success.

Furthermore, the State Department had a deliberately obstructionist "Paper Walls" policy in operation to delay or prevent the issuing of any officially permitted visas for all refugees who desired entry to America.", This Paper Wall contributed to the low number of refugees. From July 1941 all immigration applications went to a special inter-departmental committee, and under the "relatives rule" special scrutiny was given to any applicant with relatives in German, Italian or Russian territory.

Beginning in July 1943, a new State Department visa application form over four feet long was used, with details required of the refugee and of the two sponsors; and six copies had to be submitted. Applications took about nine months, and were not expedited even in cases of imminent danger. Furthermore, from fall 1943, applications from refugees "not in acute danger" could be refused (e.g. people who had reached Spain, Portugal or North Africa). This created a huge barrier, since many of these children (usually with their parents) had fled there from other parts of Europe, some by being smuggled over the Pyrenees.

The American public also resisted the OTC program, because of social hostility to allowing foreigners to enter the U.S. during the Depression, and generally from isolationist and antisemitic forces.

== Some of the Groups of OTC Sailings, and their Rescuers ==
- The "Brith Sholom" Group of 50 OTC, who were rescued in 1938 by Gilbert and Eleanor Kraus. Their detailed story is presented in a later section.
- In June 1942, about 50 OTC sailed from Casablanca for New York on board the Serpa Pinto. They had been helped originally by OSE in France. Then the American Friends Service Committee helped them to leave France from Marseilles to Casablanca, under the auspices of the U.S. Committee for the Care of European Children (USCOM) (and see that WIKI section).
- 3 groups totalling 311 OTC, who sailed from Lisbon, who were helped by OSE and specifically by Andree Salomon.

== Iris Posner's contributions to the OTC story ==
Iris Posner's contributions started with her "discovering" and "creating" the One Thousand Children as a concept.

Posner and Moskowitz then went on to search for information about these OTC children – their names and other OTC information – and then searched for the actual OTC "children."

Posner and Moskowitz then put on the 2002 OTC Conference (see above).

Posner created the OTC story. Posner provided the new "One Thousand Children" group-identity for these children. Posner enabled these children to realize they were "Child Survivors of the Holocaust." Posner caused all Holocaust groups and scholars to recognize this "new" group of Holocaust Child Survivors."

== One Thousand Children, Inc (OTC, Inc.) ==
Iris Posner and Leonore Moskowitz created the non-profit research and education organization One Thousand Children, Inc (OTC, Inc.), whose primary purposes are to maintain a connection between the OTC children, to explore this little-known segment of American history, and to create archival materials and depositories. OTC, Inc's print, photo, and audio-visual archives, and some of its activities have been transferred to the "YIVO Institute for Jewish Research" though OTC, Inc itself has ceased to exist (see next section).

== Video Summation of the OTC Experience, and the "Disbanding" of OTC, Inc in Oct 2013 ==
OTC, Inc. formally disbanded in Oct 2013, but its work goes on. The "closing" took place at a two-hour conference at the YIVO Institute for Jewish Research. Testimony by individual OTC'ers make up a significant part of this conference.

== British Kindertransport, and Compared with the One Thousand Children Effort ==
A larger but similar British program, the Kindertransport, is more well-known. That effort brought approximately 10,000 similarly defined mainly Jewish children to the United Kingdom, between November 21, 1938, and September 3, 1939. It had to stop at that date, since that was the beginning of World War II.

The Kindertransport program was created by the British Government which within six days of Kristallnacht presented an Act in the British Parliament. This act waived all visa and immigration requirements for an unspecified number of unaccompanied children. Naturally, the children had to be privately financed and guaranteed, and placed by various British Jewish Organizations. (Some of the "kinder" from Britain subsequently migrated to America, e.g. the Nobel Prize-winning scientists Arno Penzias and Walter Kohn.)

In contrast, the United States Government did nothing to aid any of the OTC children, and did not waive any quota or immigration requirements. The 12-year OTC effort required each OTC child to meet the American immigration requirements.

== OTC Archived Documents and Other Media Are Now Mainly at the "YIVO Institute for Jewish Research" ==
The Organization's archives have been donated to and now reside at the YIVO Institute for Jewish Research in New York City. These primary archives include video-recordings of the complete 2002 OTC Conference as well as partial written transcripts. Many artifacts, including personal diaries written as children or later as adults, are included; as well as data about each individual (identified) child, other information, and photographs. This archive is open to scholars.

The list of the 1177 originally-identified OTC'ers, with names and many other details, is at YIVO. It is also at the United States Holocaust Memorial Museum (In both cases, it is confidential, and is only available to researchers.)

Other documents and artifacts are located at the United States Holocaust Memorial Museum (USHMM), and the National Museum of American Jewish History (NMAJH) in Philadelphia.

== Story of the Rescue of 50 Brith Sholom OTC Children ==
Some of the OTC children were rescued by Jewish organizations such as HIAS. But some were rescued by individuals. For example, one American 51 year-old bachelor distant cousin sponsored and took official responsibility for a six-year-old OTC'er, but the OTC'er had to be placed in a small year-round boarding-school

A remarkable rescue was made by a private wealthy Philadelphia family, Gilbert and Eleanor Kraus. On their own, they rescued 25 boys and 25 girls from Vienna after Kristallnacht, but before the war in Europe started. They had many practical difficulties, including those to obtain the necessary 50 American visas from within the immigration quota system. On arrival, these children were first placed in the summer camp facilities of the fraternal order Brith Sholom, and then were placed into the homes of Philadelphia families.

== See also ==
- Kindertransport
- Hidden children during the Holocaust
- Children in the Holocaust
