= Almog (surname) =

Almog (Hebrew: אַלְמוֹג) is a Hebrew surname literally meaning "coral". Notable people with the surname Almog include:

- Aharon Almog (1931–2001), Israeli writer, poet and playwright
- Aharon Almog (actor) (1938–2004), Israeli actor and stage director
- Diti Almog, Israeli actor
- Doron Almog (born 1951), Major General in the Israel Defense Forces, Chair of the Jewish Agency
- Eylon Almog, Israeli professional footballer
- Lili Almog, Israeli photographer
- Oz Almog (born 1956), Israeli-Austrian artist
- Oz Almog (sociologist) (born 1960), Israeli sociologist and historian
- Ruth Almog (born 1936), Israeli novelist
- Ze'ev Almog (born 1935), Commander in Chief of the Israeli Navy

== Almogi ==
Almogi (Hebrew: אלמוגי) is a variant:

- Yosef Aharon Almogi, ne Karlenboym (1910–1991), Poland-born Israeli politician

== See also ==
- Almog (given name)
