= Almog (disambiguation) =

Almog is a kibbutz near the Dead Sea.

Almog may also refer to:

- Almog (surname)
- Almog (given name)
