= Louis Weiss =

Louis Weiss may refer to:

- Kent Taylor (Louis William Weiss, 1907–1987), American actor
- Louis Weiss (producer) (1890–1963), low-budget independent producer of film serials
- Louis S. Weiss (1894–1950), lawyer
