= United States Committee for the Care of European Children =

The United States Committee for the Care of European Children (USCOM) was a quasi-governmental American body established in June 1940, with the intent to try to save mainly Jewish refugee children who came from Continental Europe, and to evacuate them to the United States, however, most of the children were British refugees from the blitz. Since the U.S. was neutral until Pearl Harbor on December 7, 1941, USCOM was still able to operate in Vichy France from its founding in June 1940, until the Nazi occupation of Vichy France in November 1942.

USCOM should be contrasted with CORB, whose purpose was to bring children from Great Britain to the US.

USCOM was co-founded by First Lady Eleanor Roosevelt and Louis S. Weiss. Roosevelt, from her position of influence, continued to strongly support USCOM. In actuality, she was greatly involved in the mission to rescue mainly Jewish European children through all possible relevant agencies. In 1941 Marshall Field III was USCOM's President or Chairman (sources differ).

Many other non-Governmental organisations, such as HIAS, the Joint, and the Quakers, and individuals such as Gilbert and Eleanor Kraus, also worked to save mainly Jewish children and send them to the United States. In Europe, these included the American-based GJCA which worked directly in Germany, and the French Jewish organization OSE.
