= Never Forget Your Name =

2015 book about the Holocaust

Never Forget Your Name: The Children of Auschwitz is a 2015 book by Alwin Meyer, initially published in German and translated to English in 2022, dealing with the topic of children in the Holocaust.

== See also ==
- Children in the Holocaust
