= Hello Neighbor (organization) =

US non-profit organization

- Founded: 2017
- Founder: Sloane Davidson
- Legal status: 501(c)(3) nonprofit
- Headquarters: Pittsburgh, Pennsylvania
- Region served: United States
- Website: helloneighbor.io/

Hello Neighbor is a United States non-profit organization headquartered in Pittsburgh, Pennsylvania, that was founded in 2017 by Sloane Davidson. This organization aims to partner recent refugees with families already living in their communities. The catalyst for Hello Neighbor was Thanksgiving 2016, when Davidson stumbled onto an Airbnb program that was matching American families with refugee families for Thanksgiving dinner. Davidson signed up and got a call saying she had been matched with a family of Syrian refugees in her neighborhood. The two families connected and became close friends. It was this interaction that inspired Davidson to launch the non-profit.

Hello Neighbor's goal is to help refugees become more self-sufficient by partnering them with friends who can help them both navigate city systems and entertain them.

In 2017 the program supported 25 refugee families with 25 families in the Pittsburgh area.

== See also ==
- HIAS
