= Hidden children during the Holocaust =

Children in the Holocaust (mainly Jewish) were hidden in various ways during the Holocaust in order to save them from the Nazis. Most were hidden in Poland, though some were hidden in Western Europe. Not all attempts to save them were successful; for instance, German Jewish refugee Anne Frank was eventually captured in Amsterdam. The majority of European Jewish children did not survive the Holocaust; it is estimated that 93 to 94 percent were murdered.

== Methods of hiding ==
Poland had the largest prewar Jewish population, and during the war had the largest number of hidden children. In addition, significant numbers were also hidden in France and the Netherlands, with smaller numbers in other parts of Western Europe. Children were hidden in several different ways, each traumatic, but those in which the child was separated from his or her parents proved the most difficult (see next section).

- A child who was actually hidden with at least one of his parents, in some physical location, such as a secret attic. The family would need at least one outside non-Jewish "helper," who brought in daily food and other supplies. The lives of the helpers were in extreme danger if the Nazis were to find out this deception, as they would be murdered as well.
- A child who was "hidden" in plain sight in a convent, as if one of the other Catholic children. The child would have to be able to behave as all the other Catholic convent children behaved – know their prayers, know how to handle a rosary, know how to behave during mass, etc. All these skills would have to be learned very quickly. In this case, at least one of the nuns, and generally more, would have to know that the child was actually Jewish and "hiding". Once again, the lives of the nuns were in extreme danger if the Nazis were to find out this deception.
- A Hidden child during the Holocaust who was "hidden" in plain sight and was placed into the care of a "foster-family," usually Catholic, and raised as if one of the family. To explain the sudden "arrival" of this "new" child into the family, he might for instance be described as a cousin who had come to join this family, perhaps from the countryside. Since he was now a new member of this Catholic family, he too would have to be able to behave as other Catholic children behaved – know the prayers, know how to handle a rosary, know how to behave during mass, etc. Once again, the lives of the true family-members were in extreme danger if the Nazis were to find out this deception.

Some such "foster-family" children were only babies at the time they were "placed" with a foster-family, others only toddlers or else still very young.
The experience of these "foster family" hidden children was very similar to that of the One Thousand Children.

- A child who was "hidden" in plain sight by the Œuvre de Secours aux Enfants (OSE) as part of their continuing activities in France. (During the war, OSE was unable to continue its earlier work in Poland and elsewhere.)

In each of these cases, there had to be at least one non-Jewish helper on the outside, who risked his or her own life to help. Remembrance and records about such a person would often lead Yad Vashem, the Holocaust Remembrance Museum in Israel, to designate and honor them as "Righteous among the Nations" (this is often mis-stated as "Righteous Gentile").

== Trauma ==
Hidden children during the Holocaust faced significant trauma during and after World War II. Most importantly, except when the child was in hiding with at least one parent, the child had effectively lost all parental support during the war, but would be in the care of strangers.

Younger children were often too young to remember their parents. Nonetheless, they did suffer the extreme trauma of separation from their parents and being placed with previously unknown "foster-parents." While they did not remember this trauma consciously, it remained in their subconscious and in most cases had an impact on their future life behavior.

Older children knew that if they were discovered by the Nazis their fate was definitely dire and included possible death. This caused extreme stress and trauma at that time, and that trauma continued after the Holocaust and perhaps even into adulthood.

== Post war era ==
After the war, as with nearly all child survivors of the Holocaust, most hidden children were never reunited with their parents. Even with the parents still living, most were nearly murdered by the Nazis and/or separated from their children. After some delay, the children would usually be adopted by a new family, but the trauma from the Holocaust would often remain.

The Catholic Church had baptized many Jewish children during the war to hide them as Catholics, but after the war often refused to reunite the children with their Jewish relatives.

In the Netherlands, the Dutch government set up a commission after World War II to decide the care of orphaned children, whom they deemed foster children. The government treated the issue as a Dutch matter and not a Jewish matter, causing Dutch Jews wishing to reconstitute the Jewish community to see the Dutch government as an adversary. One scholar contends that the controversy was a continuation of the Holocaust into the postwar period.

A notable source on hidden children is a book of excerpts of writings by themselves "Out of Chaos: Hidden Children Remember the Holocaust".

== Recognition and restitution by German government ==
In 2014, the German government, through the Claims Conference, officially arranged to make an extra restitution payment of 2,500 euros to each former hidden child, in addition to any other restitution for Holocaust experiences to which they were entitled. This was in recognition that any physical or emotional trauma suffered by a child would be greater than that suffered by an adult in similar circumstances, because the child would not yet have developed fully mature coping skills. Due to budgetary constraints, the amount of the payment (about $3,300 at the time) was only a token sum, but nevertheless brought some symbolic value.

== In popular culture ==
=== Feature films ===
The 2021 French film Valiant Hearts by Mona Achache follows six Jewish children who were hidden in the Château de Chambord in France during World War II. The film was inspired by the real-life experiences of the director's grandmother, Suzanne Achache–Wiznitzer.

=== Documentaries ===
A 2002 documentary, Secret Lives: Hidden Children and Their Rescuers During WWII, covered the hidden children.

A 1980 documentary "As If It Were Yesterday" Directed by Myriam Abramowicz and Esther Hoffenberg documents the Belgian Resistance who, during the Nazi occupation, hid over 4000 Jewish children.

=== Books ===
'The Diary Of A Young Girl' by Anne Frank

“The Hidden Child Book Club Remembers: An Anthology of Holocaust Stories” edited by Susan Gold

"Hidden: True Stories of Children Who Survived World War II" by Marcel Prins and Peter Henk Steenhuis: first-hand stories of Jewish children in hiding in the Netherlands during WWII.

"Hidden Children of the Holocaust: Belgian Nuns and their Daring Rescue of Young Jews from the Nazis" by Autor Suzanne Vromen.
