= Ruth Almog =

Israeli novelist

- רות אלמוג
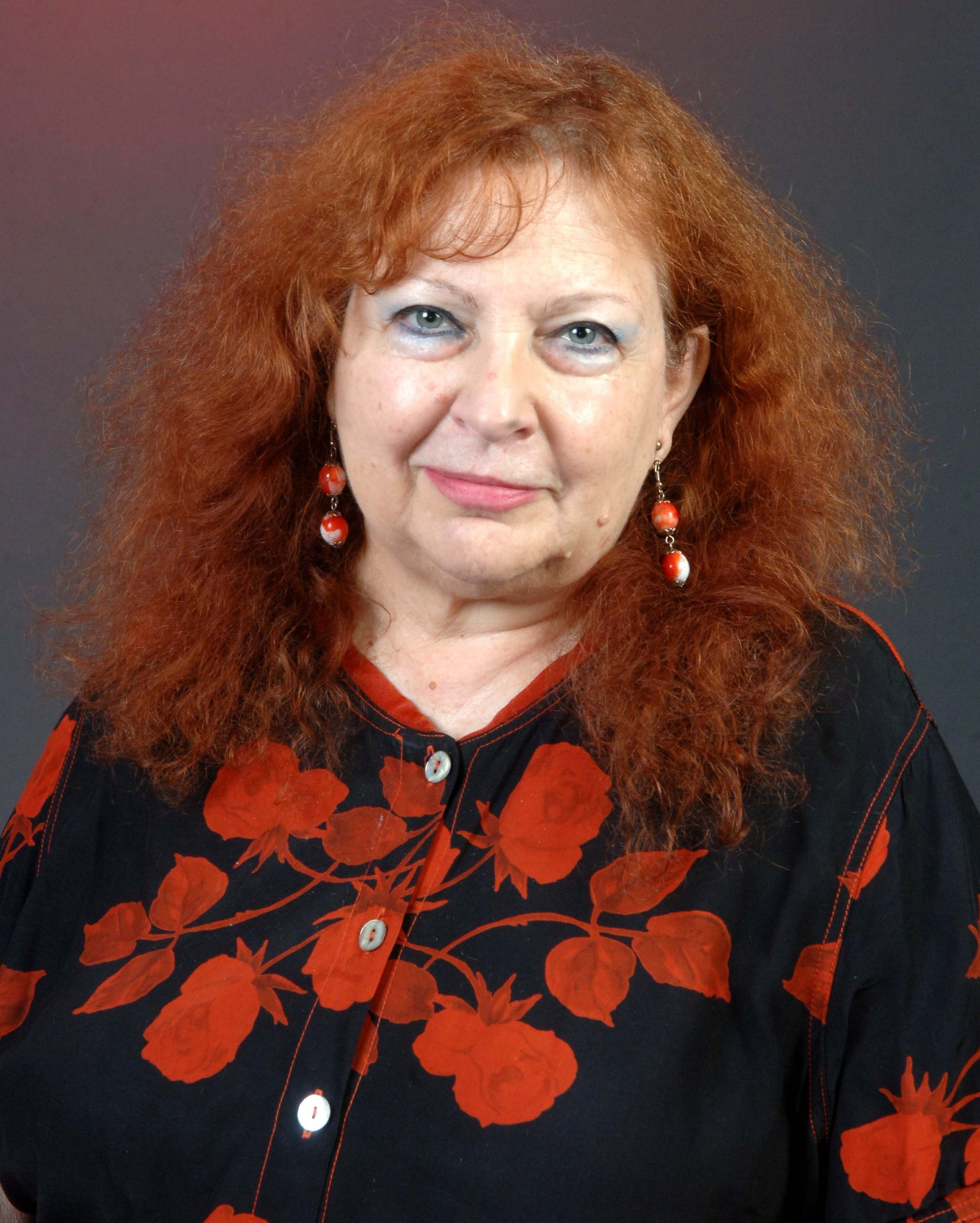
- Born: 15 May 1936 (age 90); Petah Tikva, Mandatory Palestine
- Education: David Yellin Teachers College, Tel Aviv University
- Occupations: Novelist; Editor; Academic
- Spouse: Aaron Almog
- Children: 2

Ruth Almog (Hebrew: רות אלמוג; born 15 May 1936) is an Israeli novelist.

== Life ==
Almog was born 15 May 1936 in Petah Tikva, Mandatory Palestine to parents who immigrated from Hamburg in 1933. She studied at the David Yellin Teachers College, and at Tel Aviv University. She taught philosophy and film at Tel Aviv University. She was the deputy editor of the literary section of the mainstream daily Haaretz and writer-in-residence at the Hebrew University of Jerusalem.

In 1959 she married poet Aharon Almog and they had two daughters, Shira and Eliana.

== Awards ==
- 1985 and 2000: Ze'ev Prize for children's and youth literature
- 1989 Brenner Prize
- 2000 Yad Vashem Prize
- 2000 Andersen Honor Citation
- 2001 Agnon Prize from the Jerusalem municipality
- 2004 Newman Prize from Bar Ilan University
- 2004 German Gerty Spies Prize for Literature
- 2006 Bialik Prize for Lifetime Achievement
- 1995 2007 Prime Minister's Prize
- 2010 ACUM lifetime achievement award

The book My Journey with Alex had won the Hans Christian Andersen Award, the Ze'ev Prize for children's and youth literature and the Yad Vashem Prize, as well as a UNESCO commendation. It is recommended by the Ministry of Education.

== Works ==
- Hasdei Ha-Laila Shel Margerita (Marguereta`s Night Grace) (stories), Tarmil, 1969
- Be-Eretz Gzerah (The Exile) (novel), Am Oved, 1971
- Aharei Tu Bi-Shvat (After Tubishvat) (stories), Tarmil, 1979
- Et Ha-Zar Ve-Ha- Oyev (The Stranger and the Foe), (novella), Sifriat Poalim, 1980
- Mavet Ba-Geshem (Death in the Rain) (novel), Keter, 1982
  - Death in the rain: a novel, Red Crane Books, 1993, ISBN 978-1-878610-09-6
- Nashim (Women) (stories), Keter, 1986
  - De zilveren bal, translators Benno Ehrlich, Annegert Fuchshuber, Ploegsma, 1994, ISBN 978-90-216-1087-0
  - La palla d'argento, Translator O. D. Padoa, Mondadori, 2004, ISBN 978-88-04-53385-6
- Shorshei Avir (Roots of Light) (novel), Keter/Hakibbutz Hameuchad, 1987; 2003
- Tikun Omanuti (Invisible Mending) (novella & stories), Keter, 1993
- Meahev Mushlam (A Perfect Lover) (novel), with Esther Ettinger, Keter, 1995
  - Der perfekte Liebhaber, Translators Ester Etinger, Vera Loos, Goldmann, 1999, ISBN 978-3-442-43991-1
  - Meine Reise mit Alex , Translators Vera Loos, Naomi Nir-Bleimling, Sauerländer, 2002, ISBN 978-3-7941-4621-5
- Ha-Agam Ha-Pnimi (The Inner Lake), (composition), Hakibbutz Hameuchad, 2000
- Estelina Ahuvati (Estelina My Love) (novel), Ruth Almog & Esther Ettinger, Keter, 2002
- Kol Ha-Osher Ha-Mufraz Ha-ze (All This Overflowing Bliss) (stories), Keter, 2003
- Be-Ahava, Natalia (Love, Natalia) (novel), Keter, 2005
- Meil Katon (A Little Coat) (novella), Kinneret/Zmora-Bitan/Dvir, 2008
- Zara Be-Gan Eden (Stranger in Paradise) (novel), Kinneret/Zmora Bitan/Dvir, 2008

=== Children's and youth titles ===
- Naphy Nasich Ha-Karnafim (Naphy), Am Oved, 1979
- Gilgil, Massada/Modan, 1986
- Tzoanim Ba-Pardes (Nomads in the Orchard)(youth), Massada, 1986
- Kadur Ha-Kesef (The Silver Ball), Am Oved, 1986
- Hasibor (The Wonderbird), Am Oved, 1991
- Rakefet, Ahavati Ha-Rishonah (Rakefet, My First Love), Keter, 1992
- Gilgil Rotza Kelev (Gilgil Wants a Dog), Modan, 1998
- המסע שלי עם אלכס (Ha-Masa Sheli Im Alex, My Journey with Alex), Hakibbutz Hameuchad, 1999
  - The story of wandering of Holocaust children, two brothers, Erwin and Alex. Translated in German (Meine Reise mit Alex), Serbian (Moje putovanje s Aleksom) and Chinese.
- Balut Ha-Pele Shel Kamila (The Magic Acorn), Hakibbutz Hameuchad, 1999
- Od Chibuk Echad (Just One More Hug), Hakibbutz Hameuchad, 2003

=== Anthologies ===
- Six Israeli novellas. David R. Godine Publisher. 1999. ISBN 978-1-56792-091-8.
