= Lili Almog =

Israeli photographer

- לילי אלמוג
- Born: 1961 (age 64–65); Tel Aviv, Israel
- Occupation: Photographer
- Movement: Contemporary art

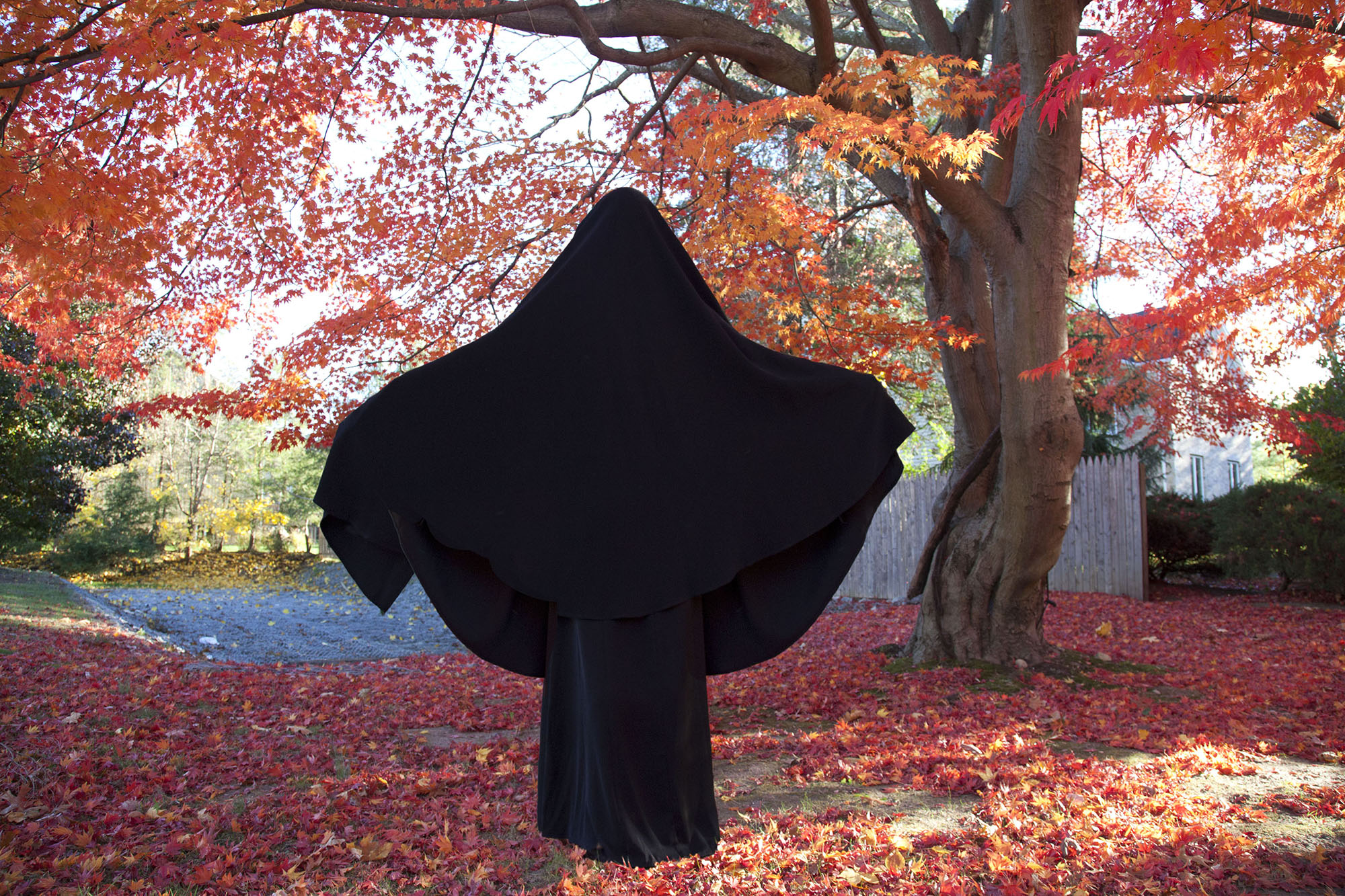
Seasons, by Almog

Lili Almog (Hebrew: לילי אלמוג; born 1961) is a photographer and mixed media artist, living and working in New York City, who has made intimate spiritual portraits of women cultural identities around the world. Almog has worked primarily in the environmental portraiture genre, among her most notable work is photographing cloistered nuns in Israel, Palestine, and the United States and working in Muslim women mosques and with other minority women in rural China.

== Biography ==
Almog has built a celebrated photography career, focusing her lens primarily on women and, more recently, on the traces of human presence in America's post-industrial landscapes. Raised in an Israeli matriarchal home, she emigrated to the United States in the mid-1980s as a photojournalist, working on fashion shoots and portraiture, and documenting New York's eccentric nightlife in candid black-and-white images. She gradually transitioned into photographing only women, presenting their "psyche and their body" in their intimate space and revealing their "spiritual state of mind and cultural identity" that has been affected by conflict and western culture.

After graduating from the School of Visual Arts in the 1990s, she continued to develop her own vision, which have taken her into women's private spaces (Bed Sequence), cloistered nuns in remote Carmelite monasteries (Perfect Intimacy), and minority women in rural China (The Other Half of the Sky), where she sensitively captured women in moments of solitude and introspection. "My intention…is to enter an extremely private space without disrupting the delicate essence of communication between subject, their experience, and the viewer," Almog has said.

Between Presence and Absence consists of images of exteriors and interiors of Kibbutz damaged houses that were built based on Bauhaus architecture. This series creates both a social and historical record, as well as a poetic and metaphorical impression of destruction and metamorphosis. In turning the spectral into the tangible, this project bares witness to the cycles of life and speaks to more universal themes of memory and loss. In Down to Earth, Almog expanded her interest in human activity to include the marks or traces left by humankind, in this case, focusing on the landscapes such as golf courses, baseball fields and airplane graveyards linking the invisible borders of culture and art – including drawings, sculptures and video.

Lili's most recent project is The Space Within which continues to portray women and their spiritual identity within, applying a staged photography approach that result into images that make cultural commentary on religion and emphasizes the depiction of the covered women throughout art history. This project consists of two series: Drawing Room and Seasons.

== Solo and group exhibitions ==
- San Francisco Museum of Modern Art
- Herzliya Museum of Contemporary Art
- The Griffin Museum, Massachusetts
- Ffotogallery, United Kingdom
- Museet for Fotokunst, Denmark
- Tel Aviv Museum of Art
- The David Tower Museum
- Museé de la Photographie a Charleri, Belgium
- The Andrea Meislin Gallery, New York City
- Photographers' Place, UK
- Prague House of Photography, Czech Republic
- Stills Gallery, Australia
- The New York City Alternative Museum

== Collections ==
Almog's work is held in the following permanent collections:

- SF MoMA
- Victoria and Albert Museum
- Museum of Fine Arts, Houston
- Harvard Art Museums, Cambridge
- Milwaukee Art Museum
- The Israel Museum, Jerusalem
- Samuel Dorsky Museum of Art, New York
- Norton Museum
- Musee de la Photographie, Belgium
- Museet for Fotokunst, Denmark
- Herzliya Museum of Contemporary Art
- The Wieland Collection, Atlanta
- The UK Art Museum, Kentucky

== Publications ==
- Bed Sequence (2002) is featured in the Hertzliya Museum of Contemporary Art.
- Perfect Intimacy (2006) Powerhouse Press ISBN 978-1-57687-315-1
- The Other Half of the Sky (2009) Powerhouse Press ISBN 978-1-57687-499-8
- Between Presence and Absence (2015)
