= Aharon Almog =

Israeli poet and writer (1931–2021)

Aharon Almog (Hebrew: אהרן אלמוג; September 14, 1931 – May 8, 2021) was an Israeli writer, poet and playwright.

== Biography ==
Aharon Almog was born in Tel Aviv, Mandatory Palestine. His grandfather immigrated from Yemen to Palestine in the 19th century. (Note: Aharon's original surname was Mevorat, from his grandfather Rabbi Chaim Mevorat (חיים מבורת). His widow said that he did not receive the Israel Prize because he was a Mizrahi and was broken by this.) Almog graduated from the agricultural school in Mikveh Israel.

In 1948 he enlisted in Palmach, took part in the Israel's War of Independence, which experience he described in his novels. After discharging from the IDF he was among the ones who reestablished the kibbutz Gezer and many of his stories and poems are dedicated to this place. During 1956–1957 he studied literature at Tel Aviv University and after that he taught Hebrew literature in high schools. He published his first poem in 1953 and his first book of stories in 1959.

He was married to the writer Ruth Almog from 1959 and they had two daughters, Shira and Eliana.

== Books ==
The complete bibliography (in Hebrew) may be found at a webpage of The New Hebrew Literature Lexicon, Ohio State University

=== Poetry in Hebrew ===
- Aviv Atzevet B’Yehuda [Sad Spring in Judea], Sifriat Poalim, Merhavia, 1956
- Hatzda’a Le-Israel [Praise to Israel], Sifriat Poalim, Merhavia, 1972
- Hilton Yerushalayim [Jerusalem Hilton], Sifriat Poalim, Merhavia, 1979
- La-Menatzeah Al Mot Sahkan Kaduregel [To Immortalize a Football Player], Hakibbutz Hameuchad, Tel Aviv, 1981
- Requiem Le-Zonah [Requiem for a Whore], Hakibbutz Hameuchad, Tel Aviv, 1983
- Rehov Herzl [Herzl Street], Am Oved, Tel Aviv, 1987
- Im Tiru Sukka Afa [If You See a Sukka Flying], Hakibbutz Hameuchad, Tel Aviv, 2004

=== Fiction in Hebrew ===
- Ha-Yamim Ha-Rishonim [First Days], Tarmil, Tel Aviv, 1964
- Kelev Shahor [Black Dog and Other Stories], Tarmil, Tel Aviv, 1974
- Shavua Be-Tashah [A Week in 1948], Tarmil, Tel Aviv,1980
- Ha-Laila She-Bo Meta Ha-Tzionut [The Night that Zionism Died], Zmora Bitan, Tel Aviv, 1989
- Al Tats-hiku et Safta [Don't Make Grandma Laugh], Zmora Bitan, Tel Aviv, 1994

=== Play ===
- Tikun Hatzot [Midnight Prayer], Ministry of Defense, Tel Aviv, 1961

=== Translations ===
The following books were translated in English:

- Sad Spring in Judah
- First Days
- Midnight Prayer
- Praise to Israel
- Black Dog and other Stories
- Jerusalem Hilton
- A Week in 1948

== Awards ==
- Brenner Prize in 1982
- Prime Minister's Prize for Hebrew Literary Works in 1989
- Bialik Prize in 1999 .
