= German Jewish Children's Aid =

The German Jewish Children's Aid (GJCA) (this is its complete name) was an organization, based in America, which acted as the receiving organization for unaccompanied (and some orphaned) Jewish children emigrating primarily from Germany to the United States. It was in charge of posting bonds for the refugee children, (thereby preventing their becoming public charges), obtaining visas, arranging their transfer to the US and caring for them after arrival. Since 1934, the organization had helped hundreds of distressed refugee children resettle in USA. After November 1942, it was renamed "European Jewish Children's Aid."

== History ==
The purpose of the German Jewish Children's Aid (GJCA) was to act as the receiving organization for unaccompanied or orphaned Jewish children emigrating primarily from Germany to the United States. It worked to provide visas and other necessary transit papers and acted as financial sponsor for the children (to avoid their "becoming a public charge") so that they could obtain those visas. It also obtained "foster home" placement or other housing for those children.

The German Jewish Children's Aid Society was formed in New York in 1934 by a coalition consisting of the New York Foundation, the Baron de Hirsch Fund, B'nai B'rith, the Hofmeimer Foundation, the American Jewish Committee and the Women's Committee of the American Jewish Congress. These organizations contributed the funds for the GJCA. Cecilia Razovsky was elected Executive Secretary of the organization at the time of its founding.

All the children came unaccompanied; the parents were forced to stay behind in Germany or Austria or were dead. Most of these parents were murdered by the Nazis.

In 1938, when difficulties were encountered in raising funds for the GJCA work, the National Council of Jewish Women assumed financial responsibility for the German-Jewish Children's Aid and its administration was taken over by the National Refugee Service. Both of these functions were, in turn, taken over completely by the National Refugee Service in 1941.

In November 1942, to accommodate federal government refugee legislation and coordinate with the United States Committee for the Care of European Children, the German-Jewish Children's Aid changed its name to the European-Jewish Children's Aid.

The GJCA was based in the United States, but importantly it also had many personnel in Europe, primarily in Germany. After the March 1938 Anschluss German take-over of Austria to form the Greater German Reich, there were also many personnel in Austria.

The GJCA worked together with other organizations such as the Hebrew Immigrant Aid Society (HIAS) . Later it became part of the American Jewish Joint Distribution Committee (the "Joint").

The German Jewish Children's Aid, beginning in 1934, placed children primarily in private homes.

== One Child's Story: Werner S. Zimmt ==
Werner S. Zimmt is just one of the many stories of these children, that survived because of the German-Jewish Children's Aid. In an exclusive interview with journalist David Leighton, published in the Arizona Daily Star newspaper, on May 13, 2014, he told his story:

Zimmt and his twin brother were born to a Jewish family in Berlin, Germany. After Adolf Hitler's rise to power and the inception of his anti-Semitic policies, his parents, fearing for their sons lives, worked with the German-Jewish Children's Aid to quietly move them to safety in the United States. The twins arrived in the U.S. in 1935, and after a short time in an orphanage in New York, were moved to Chicago, where they lived with a foster family for a few years. During this time he learned English and attended school. His parents would eventually escape the Nazi's death grip and come to the U.S. to join their sons.

When the U.S. entered World War II, he volunteered to serve in the U.S. Marines, but was rejected because he was considered an enemy alien due to his German heritage. The following year, the U.S. Government changed its mind and he was drafted in the U.S. Army. "He had the dangerous job of manning listening posts in front of the main line and sending back intelligence to headquarters or going on reconnaissance patrols. He also served as the interrogator of German prisoners of war."

After the war, he went on to become a chemist, working for DuPont in Philadelphia for many years. After he retired he relocated to Tucson, Arizona, where he worked at the University of Arizona, Department of Agriculture and also volunteered at the Arizona State Museum on campus. Zimmt died on September 12, 2014.
