= Louis S. Weiss =

American lawyer

- Born: Louis Stix Weiss; February 7, 1894; New York City, US
- Died: November 27, 1950 (aged 56); New York City, US
- Education: Horace Mann School; Yale University; Columbia Law School
- Occupation: Lawyer
- Parent(s): Samuel Weiss, Carrie Stix
- Relatives: Carol Weiss King (sister)

Louis Stix Weiss was a name partner of the international law firm of Paul, Weiss, Rifkind, Wharton & Garrison, a firm that traces its roots to one founded by Louis's father Samuel W. Weiss in 1875. He was best known as one of banker Marshall Field III's lawyers and for his work towards civil rights.

== Early life and education ==
Louis Weiss was born on February 7, 1894, in New York City, the second son of Samuel and Carrie Stix Weiss. He attended the Horace Mann School and was graduated from Yale College in 1915. He began studies at the Columbia Law School, which were interrupted by the First World War. Rejected on medical grounds for military service, he spent the war years working for War Industries Board headed by Bernard Baruch. At war's end, he returned to Columbia Law School, where he became Editor-in-Chief of the Columbia Law Review and graduated in 1920.

== Career ==
After a brief association with the law firm of Simpson Thacher & Bartlett, he formed his own partnership with his law school classmate and friend, John F. Wharton. In 1927, this two-person firm merged into the successor of the firm his father had founded, which was renamed Cohen, Cole, Weiss & Wharton. That firm and its successors became famous for breaking down the barriers of Jews practicing with Gentiles, as well as its commitment to civil and human rights.

In the late 1930s, Weiss met Marshall Field III through their common interest in psychoanalysis, and Weiss became Field's lawyer, as well as counsel to Field Enterprises and assorted other Field interests, including the Chicago Sun and the ill-fated PM newspaper edited by Ralph Ingersoll. In 1946, Weiss recruited former Treasury Department General Counsel Randolph E. Paul and former War Labor Board chairman Lloyd K. Garrison to his firm, which was renamed Paul, Weiss, Wharton & Garrison.

In 1950, Weiss persuaded U.S. District Judge Simon H. Rifkind to join the firm, which then adopted its current name of Paul, Weiss, Rifkind, Wharton & Garrison.

Weiss was a longtime member of the National Legal Committee of the NAACP and was elected to succeed Howard Law School Dean Charles H. Houston as its chair. He was a director of the American Council on Race Relations, a founder with Eleanor Roosevelt of the U.S. Committee for the Care of European Children at the outset of World War II, a longtime trustee and eventually chair of the New School for Social Research, and a trustee of, among other organizations, the Field Foundation, the National Opinion Research Center, and the American Psychoanalytic Association.

Louis Weiss died suddenly of a heart attack on November 13, 1950. The following week, Eleanor Roosevelt dedicated her syndicated column to Weiss, which she entitled "A Radiant Life." In the Chicago Defender longtime NAACP Executive Secretary Walter White called Weiss "one of a select group to whom whatever freedom Negro Americans and other minorites have won during recent years was due."
