= Diti Almog =

Israeli artist

Diti Almog דיתי אלמוג
- Born: 1960 (age 65–66); Haifa, Israel
- Education: Bezalel Academy of Arts and Design
- Movement: Minimalism; Formalism

Diti Almog (Hebrew: דיתי אלמוג; born 1960, Haifa, Israel) is an Israeli artist. She currently lives and works in New York City, New York, United States of America. Almog's most notable work is her acrylic paintings on aircraft plywood which focus on themes of interior and exterior spaces.

== Personal life ==
Almog was born in Haifa, Israel in 1960. In 1982, Almog attended the Bezalel Academy of Arts and Design, graduating in 1986. She moved to New York City in the mid-1990s where she currently lives and works. Almog is currently represented by the Wetterling Gallery, Stockholm, Sweden.

== Artwork and career ==
Almog's art career can be dated to her work in at the Bezalel Academy of Arts and Design. This early work was multi-media using materials such as embroidery and printmaking which Almog utilized to explore feminist and gender issues in Iran, as well as capitalism and the aesthetics of the 1970s.

Almog's early painting works were distinctly figurative with 1992 show in Tel Aviv featuring a collecting of jewelry. Her 1994 painting Men's Shirt and Suite, is an example of Almog's transition from figurative to abstract with less utilization of multi-media elements. Currently, Almog primarily works with acrylic paint on aircraft plywood.

Her paintings feature various squares and rectangles that are either flat or painted with a gradient. These paintings lack any visible brushstrokes or texture. Her works are formalist and minimalist and layers rectangles in order to explore with concepts of interior and exterior spaces. Often, Almog will divide her canvas into distinct sections, such as with September late afternoon with back room (2011), where the image on the left and right thematically connect but it is unknown whether they exist in the same plane of reality. This question of space is present in a variety of her artwork with several works featuring a location in the title. Some of her paintings also involve her own work hanging on a gallery wall. These paintings show small works that mirror Almog's own complete with an edge and shadow to show dimension. The white background that these images are hung on reference the modern, white gallery wall.

Almog works vary in scale even within her bodies of work. In exhibitions, works 4 by 8 inches in size have been hung next to larger works 14 by 21 inches in size. Almog often paints smaller works hanging them directly next to each other, this can appear to make it a larger canvas, September Afternoon (2011) and Sea and Sky (2011) are one example of this. Repetition is also a large feature between her works. A replica of her painting ACA is painted on her work AC along with other black squares, this same interplay can be seen within September Afternoon (2011) and Sea and Sky (2011) where the same two blue gradients are featured in the same pattern within the two separate works.

=== Titling ===
A notable feature of Almog's work is her way of titling her artwork. Almog's early artwork has more descriptive names such as Men's Shirt and Suite (1994). However, her titles in the mid-1990s are distinctly different named through various capital letters. Art critic Alred Corn suggested this could represent a musical quality with the letters representing musical notes. Almog's 1996 exhibit at the Boesky & Callery featured such works as ACA, AC, ABA and ACB. However, other works utilize the concept of mixed capital letters such as SMAA, GPPL, and MLAA. Almog has continued to play with the titles of her work using some dates for the title of her works featured in her 2007 show at Inga Gallery, September 24th (2007), December 4th, and Bedroom (2007) were among the titles. Earlier work, FF2, 8:00am (2001) and Main Room, 10:00am (2003), utilized time and place as a title.

== Selected exhibition ==
=== Selected solo exhibitions ===
- 2009 Diti Almog - Paintings, Spacesurplus, New York, New York, USA
- 2006 A Retrospective, Tel Aviv Museum of Art, Tel Aviv, Israel
- 2002 Wetterling Gallery
- 1998 Galerie Anne de Villepoix Paris, France
- 1995, 1994, 1993, 1992, 1991, 1990 Artifact Gallery, Tel Aviv, Israel
- 1987 Bograshov Gallery, Tel Aviv

=== Selected group exhibition ===
- 2015 Can’t Reach me There, Midway Contemporary Art, Minneapolis, Minnesota, USA
- 2010 High Definition, Bezalel Gallery, Tel Aviv, Israel, Curated by Ruti Director
- 2008 Check-Post Art in Israel in the 1980s, Haifa Museum of Art, Haifa, Israel
- 2008 Reframing, CCA Andratx, Mallorca, Spain, Curated by Barry Schwabsky
- 2004 The Sydney Biennale, Sydney, Australia
- 1996 Ceremonial, Apexart, New York, New York, USA, Curated by Barry Schwabsky
- 1991 Perspective, The Tel Aviv Museum of Art, Tel Aviv, Israel
- 1986 Artists’ Studios, Aika Brown Gallery, Jerusalem, Israel

== Related artists ==
- Anges Martin
- Michal Heiman
- Pamela Levy
- Petter Halley
- Barnett Newman
- Mark Rothko
- Robert Ryman
