= Children's Overseas Reception Board =

British government-sponsored organisation

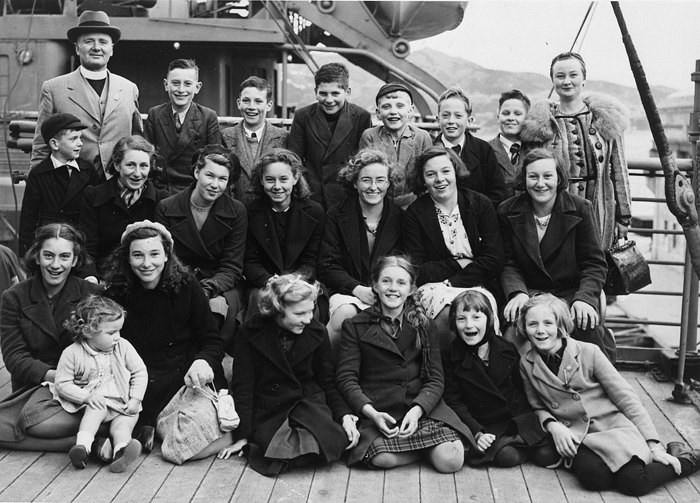
Children's Overseas Reception Board (CORB) group bound for New Zealand, 1940

The Children's Overseas Reception Board (CORB) was a British government sponsored organisation. The CORB evacuated 2,664 British children from England, so that they would escape the imminent threat of German invasion and the risk of enemy bombing in World War II. This was during a critical period in British history, between July and September 1940, when the Battle of Britain was raging, and German invasion forces were being amassed across the English Channel.

The children were sent mainly to the four Dominion countries, Canada 1,532 (in nine parties), Australia 577 (three parties), New Zealand 202 (two parties), and South Africa 353 (two parties), and 838 to the USA under the United States Committee for the Care of European Children programme. In the first few months over 211,000 children were registered with the scheme. A further 24,000 children had been approved for sailing in that time and over 1,000 volunteer escorts, including doctors and nurses, enrolled. It was planned as a temporary exile for the children, to return home to their families when conditions permitted.

== Historical background ==
Even before the Second World War began in September 1939, the British government had prepared for the evacuation of over a million vulnerable people, mainly children, from the towns and cities to safe areas in the countryside away from the risk of enemy bombing. It was widely believed that up to four million people could be killed by enemy attacks on British towns and cities.

When war did eventually break out, the question of sending British children to Commonwealth countries was brought up in Parliament. It was initially rejected on the grounds of creating panic or spreading defeatism. Instead the government decided that the evacuation to rural areas of Britain should continue as it was felt that this was adequate.

Nonetheless, it is estimated that, by the end of 1941, some 14,000 British children had been evacuated overseas by private arrangement, over 6,000 to Canada and some 5,000 to the United States.

They went either to relatives or friends or left as part of private schemes, run by businesses such as Hoover and Kodak, who would evacuate the children of their British employees. At the beginning of the War America was neutral, and had strict immigration laws. This presented a serious obstacle to the U.S.A. accepting any significant number of British refugees.

Initially these British evacuations to America were a private undertaking and not a British Government sponsored or aided evacuation, but this changed later (see below).

In a related American activity, the quasi-governmental "U.S. Committee for the Care of European Children" (USCOM) was established in June 1940. Its purpose, was to try to save mainly Jewish refugee children who came from Continental Europe (as contrasted with those of the CORB from Great Britain), and to evacuate them to America. Images of German bombing raids and European refugees had a major impact on American opinion and this increased when the Germans began bombing the UK. America was neutral until December 1941, which meant that USCOM was still able to operate in Vichy France after May 1940. On the ground in France, the Quaker American Friends Service Committee (AFSC) (the Quakers - see History of the Quakers) worked with the OSE to select children. In a complicated process, several hundred children made it to the United States, though the rescue of many more was ultimately thwarted by the Nazi occupation of southern France. The organisation called the United States Committee for the Care of European Children was strongly supported by First Lady Eleanor Roosevelt (She was the honorary president). This program helped evacuate more than 838 children to America. Other organisations and individuals also worked to save Jewish children and send them to the United States.

In 1941 Geoffrey Shakespeare, British Under-Secretary of State for Dominion Affairs, announced that a total of 838 children had been sent under the auspices of the United States Committee for the Care of European Children, with the collaboration of the Children’s Overseas Reception Board.

== Organisation of the scheme ==
=== Prelude to CORB ===
The first British civilian casualties of World War II occurred when a German U-boat sank the Cunard passenger liner SS Athenia (1922) chartered from the Anchor Donaldson Line on September 3, 1939, the day Britain entered the War. It was sunk without warning west of Scotland by U-30, which had been shadowing the liner and attacked when it received news that Britain and Germany were at war. ‘Athenia’ was carrying evacuees from Liverpool to Canada. There was a total of 1,103 passengers in addition to the crew. Survivors were rescued by the British destroyers HMS Electra, Escort and Fame as well as merchantmen ‘City of Flint’ and ‘Southern Cross’ and the Norwegian tanker ‘Knute Nelson’. The survivors were brought to Galway in neutral Ireland. 118 passengers were killed, including 28 Americans.

On 10 May 1940, the Germans started their second blitzkrieg that overran the Netherlands, Belgium, and Luxembourg, and threatened France. Neville Chamberlain, resigned immediately as Prime Minister, and Winston Churchill was appointed to head a coalition government. Shortly afterwards the Germans initiated their assault on France, quickly overrunning the northern part of the country and forcing the evacuation of British and French troops from Dunkirk between 27 May and 4 June.

With the fall of France imminent, the children's evacuation scheme was again presented in the British Parliament, and this time approved.

=== Use of Thomas Cook's expertise ===
In Churchill’s newly formed War Cabinet on 17 June, Under-Secretary of State for Dominion Affairs Geoffrey Shakespeare was tasked with implementing the evacuation programme.
The same day, negotiations opened with the travel agency Thomas Cook & Son, for the new department to be housed in their London Head Office at 45 Berkeley Street. The British Government would meet the cost of the voyages with contributions taken from parents on a sliding scale, involving a means test.

Although the British Government was now involved, and this scheme was sanctioned by the Cabinet, Churchill and some others were not personally keen on the idea. Queen Elizabeth, wife of King George VI, had made her views clear at the outbreak of war. There was some suggestion that the Queen and her daughters should be evacuated to North America or Canada. To this the Queen replied in a letter, written on Windsor Castle headed notepaper: “The children will not leave unless I do. I shall not leave unless their father does, and the king will not leave the country in any circumstances, whatever.” Throughout the Second World War the Queen and her children shared the dangers and difficulties of the rest of the nation.

The new organisation and staff were quickly assembled and the scheme launched. Applications for children would be made through schools throughout the country. They would travel alone and be accompanied by selected teachers or escorts at a ratio of one to every 15 children, in addition to nurses and doctors. They would travel to the port of embarkation and be accommodated in a hostel, where final medical checks were made. In order to embark rapidly; the usual formalities were dispensed with, there would be no passports. Each child was given a luggage label with its C.O.R.B. number and as each child embarked they were given an identity disc, also with its C.O.R.B. number.

At its height the C.O.R.B. employed some 620 staff.

== Sinkings of Volendam and City of Benares ==
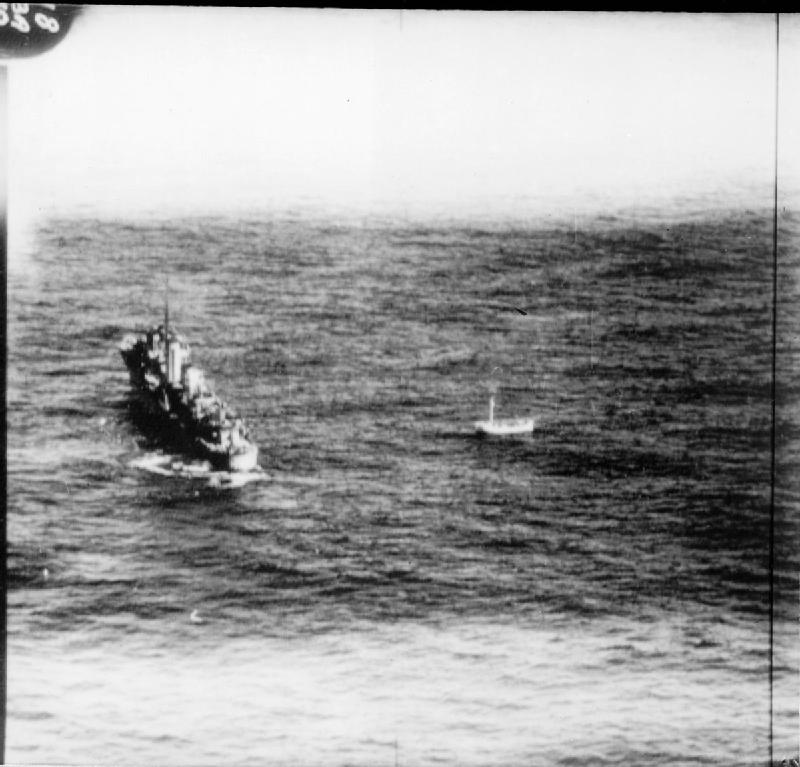
Royal Navy destroyer HMS Anthony rescues survivors from a lifeboat from City of Benares which had been adrift for nine days after the ship was sunk on 17 September 1940.

Within two weeks of each other, two ships carrying CORB children ‘Sea Evacuees’ as they were known, were torpedoed by German U-boats.

=== Volendam ===
First was Holland America Line's Volendam, whose passengers included 320 children bound for Halifax and New York. She left Liverpool on 29 August with convoy OB 205, consisting of 32 other ships, and including RMS Rangitata, carrying 113 evacuee children bound for Wellington, New Zealand. On 30 August 1940 at about 11.00pm, the convoy was attacked by U-60, firing two torpedoes that hit No. 1 hold and damaged and caused flooding in No.2 hold. The passengers and crew abandoned ship and were rescued by other ships in the convoy, including the British cargo ship Bassethound, tanker Valldemosa and Norwegian Olaf Fostenes, and the British destroyer HMS Sabre. They were taken to Greenock and other west coast ports in Scotland. All 321 children were rescued. The only casualty was the ship's purser, who was drowned. Volendam did not sink, and was subsequently taken in tow to Scotland for repairs. When she was docked, an unexploded second torpedo was found embedded in her bow. Had it exploded, she would have probably sunk.

All but two of the 321 children returned to their families after the attack on Volendam. Twelve-year old Patricia Allen of Liverpool and ten-year old Michael Brooker of Kent returned to find that their homes had been badly damaged in the Luftwaffe raids and their families were living in shelters. The two were labelled as "priority candidates" and sent back to the program to await the next available voyage.

=== City of Benares ===
The second incident, which led to the cancellation of the program, occurred 17 September 1940, when Ellerman Lines' City of Benares, carrying 90 children bound for homes in Canada, was sunk by torpedo. Both Patricia Allen and Michael Brooker were aboard. She had left Liverpool on 13 September for Quebec and Montreal. She was in convoy OB 213 with 19 other ships and was 253 miles west-southwest of Rockall, with the Atlantic weather getting worse and the ship sailing slowly. City of Benares was the flagship of the Convoy Commodore, and was leading the convoy. At about 10:00 PM U-48 attacked her with two torpedoes, but they missed. A second torpedo attack at 10:01 hit the ship in the port stern at 119 seconds later, at 10:03 PM. In the time it took the Benares to sink, 31 minutes, dozens were dead, many of them children. The first lifeboat to be lowered, Lifeboat 8 on the port-side, was struck by a wave, tipping its occupancy of more than thirty people (including 18 CORB girls and 2 escorts) into the frigid sea, killing everyone aboard. More lifeboats would capsize and spill their occupants into the water as the evacuation went on, forcing them to attempt to cling to the upturned hulls. Only two lifeboats were lowered correctly. One was Lifeboat 4 with 33 occupants, of whom only one was a child. The other was Lifeboat 12, with 46 occupants, of whom 6 were CORB boys. Hundreds more people died during the night, and a fourth lifeboat would capsize. By the time the British destroyer HMS Hurricane arrived on scene, there were only 105 survivors, thirteen of whom were children (7 CORB children and 6 private passenger children) and 19 of whom were women. Only 2 escorts had been rescued, both women. They were landed at Greenock. The 46 survivors in Lifeboat 12 were left adrift in a lifeboat for eight days (including 2 escorts – one of whom was a woman, Mary Cornish – and 6 CORB boys), and one Indian deckhand died before they were eventually found by HMS Anthony and also landed at Greenock, where two more Indian crew members would die. The ship's master, three convoy staff members (including the commodore), 120 crew members and 134 passengers were lost. 77 of the 90 CORB children died in the sinking, including Patricia Allen and Michael Brooker. In all, 258 people out of 406 on board had died, and 148 had survived. Of 100 children on board (this figure includes the 10 private passenger children), 81 had died, 19 had survived. This event brought the evacuation programme to a halt.

=== Reactions ===
The sinking of Benares caused outrage when it was reported on 23 September 1940. The British government protested that children should not have been innocent victims of war. The Americans called it a ‘dastardly act’. The Germans defended the U-boat attack, considering the ship a legitimate military target, and insisted that the British government was to blame for allowing children to travel on such ships in a war zone. The sinking was a public relations disaster for both the CORB programme and the Admiralty. The British public seemed more enraged at the Admiralty than at the Germans. The fact that the escorts were detached, Benares was at the head of the convoy, and the convoy was not taking any evasive action all featured prominently, though there was never an official enquiry.

== End of the scheme ==
After the disaster of City of Benares, British public opinion opposed the continuation of overseas evacuation, fearing further tragedies. Winston Churchill had been opposed to the scheme, so the government announced the cancellation of the CORB programme. However, private evacuation efforts continued into late 1941. By September 1940 the Royal Air Force had achieved mastery over the German Luftwaffe in the Battle of Britain, and the threat of an imminent German invasion (Operation Sea Lion) had abated.

Although the evacuation scheme had ceased in September 1940, CORB remained active. It was not disbanded, along with the advisory councils, until 1944, by which point the perceived German military threat had reduced.

The German captain of U-48, Kapitänleutnant Heinrich Bleichrodt survived the war, and was held and tried by the Allies on war crimes charges concerning the sinking of the City of Benares. He was accused of sinking the ship with the full knowledge that it had been transporting evacuees. He reaffirmed the German position that there was no way that he or the crew of the submarine could have known who was on board. It was upheld and he was acquitted. However, Bleichrodt refused to apologise to the survivors, despite several crew members of U-48, including the radio operator, expressing their shock and regret once the facts became known.

== Ships employed ==
Liverpool was the principal port used for evacuation for the North Atlantic routes to Canada and America. Gourock and Greenock in Scotland were also used. Between 21 July and 20 September 1940, 16 voyages were made carrying 2,664 CORB children. In addition there were also privately sponsored voyages. The programme itself was very limited in size; nineteen ships set sail with 3,127 children, the vast majority of whom made it to their temporary foster homes in Canada, Australia, New Zealand, South Africa.

Ships Under the CORB Scheme Carrying English and Welsh Children
Ship	Line	Sailing Date	Arrival Date	Convoy	From	Destination	Evacs Aboard	Escorts
SS Anselm	Booth Steamship Company	July 21, 1940	August 3, 1940	OB 189	Liverpool	Halifax	39 boys, 43 girls	10
MS Batory	Gdynia America Line	August 5, 1940	October 16, 1940	WS2	Liverpool	Sydney	477 children	51
RMS Hilary	Booth Steamship Company	August 6, 1940	NA	OB 194	Liverpool	Canada	70 boys, 84 girls	15
SS Oronsay	Orient Steam Navigation Company	August 10, 1940	August 21, 1940	ZA	Liverpool	Canada	187 boys, 166 girls	35
RMS Antonia	Cunard White Star	August 10, 1940	August 21, 1940	ZA	Liverpool	Canada	145 boys, 139 girls	25
SS Duchess of York	Canadian Pacific Line	August 10, 1940	August 21, 1940	ZA	Liverpool	Canada	256 boys, 238 girls	43
TSS Nestor	Booth Steamship Company	August 24, 1940	October 20, 1940	OB 203	Liverpool	Australia	82 children	10
SS Volendam	Holland America Line	August 29, 1940	Torpedoed August 30	OB 205	Liverpool	Canada	321 children	31
RMS Rangitata	New Zealand Shipping Company	August 29, 1940	October 3, 1940	OB 205	Liverpool	New Zealand	113 children	15
SS Nerissa	Red Cross Line	Sep. 8, 1940	NA	OB 210	Liverpool	Canada	16 boys, 18 girls	4
RMS Newfoundland	Furness Lines	Sep. 8, 1940	NA	OB 210	Liverpool	Canada	11 children	NA
SS City of Benares	Ellerman City & Hall Lines	Sep. 13, 1940	Torpedoed Sep. 17	OB 213	Liverpool	Montreal	46 boys, 44 girls	10
SS Diomed	Blue Funnel Line	Sep. 17, 1940	NA	OB 215	Liverpool	Australia	18 children	NA
RMS Nova Scotia	Furness Lines	Sep. 21, 1940	NA	OB 217	Liverpool	Halifax	29 children (mostly girls)	NA

Ships Under the CORB Scheme Carrying Scottish Children
Ship	Line	Sailing Date	Arrival Date	Convoy	From	Destination	Evacs Aboard	Escorts
SS Bayano	Elders & Fyffes Line	August 16, 1940	August 28, 1940	OB 199	Greenock	Canada	45 boys, 44 girls	10
RMS Ruahine	New Zealand Shipping Company	August 16, 1940	September 27, 1940	OB 199	Greenock	New Zealand	51 boys, 38 girls	9
SS Llanstephan Castle	Union Castle Line	August 24, 1940	September 20, 1940	OB 203	NA	South Africa	308 children	31
SS City of Paris	Ellerman City & Hall Lines	September 10, 1940	NA	OB 211	Liverpool	Cape Town	45 children	NA

Ships Under the CORB Scheme Carrying Children that were Disembarked After the City of Benares Sinking
Ship	Line	Planned Sailing Date	Disembarkation Date	From	Destination	Evacs Aboard	Escorts
SS City of Simla	Ellerman City & Hall Lines	September 19, 1940	September 19, 1940	Gourock	Canada	37 children (Scottish)	NA
SS Llandaff Castle	Union Castle Line	September 25, 1940	September 24, 1940	Gourock	South Africa	270 children (Scottish)	NA
SS Largs Bay	Commonwealth Line of Steamers	September 25, 1940	Disembarked with the Llandaff Castle children	Gourock	South Africa	NA	NA
RMS Rangitane	New Zealand Shipping Company	Sailed on Sep. 25, 1940 in Convoy OB 219	Recalled the same day of sailing	Gourock	New Zealand	113 (Scottish)	NA

== Children's Overseas Reception Scheme (Advisory Council) ==
The following members were appointed to the Advisory Council as announced in Parliament on 26 June 1940.They met at 45 Berkeley Street London W1, Thomas Cook & Sons, Head Office.

The Right Honourable Lord Snell (Chairman), C.B.E., LL.D.
Miss Florence Horsbrugh, M.P., Parliamentary Secretary, Ministry of Health.
Mr. James Chuter Ede, M.P., Parliamentary Secretary, Board of Education.
Mr. J. Westwood, M.P., Parliamentary Under-Secretary for Scotland.
Miss Ellen Wilkinson, M.P., Parliamentary Secretary, Ministry of Pensions.
Mr. E. R. Appleton, Organizer of Empire Youth movements.
Major Cyril Bavin, O.B.E., Y.M.C.A.
Reverend John Bennett, Catholic Council of British Overseas Settlement.
The Countess of Bessborough, Chairman of Council, Society for Overseas Settlement of British Women.
Miss, Grace Browning, Girl Guide's Association.
Mr. Laurence Cadbury, O.B.E., M.A., Chairman, Cadbury Brothers, Limited, an authority on school and welfare problems.
Lieut.-Colonel Culshaw, Salvation Army.
Miss Doggett, O.B.E., League of Empire.
Miss Ellen Evans, Principal, The Glamorgan Training College: also appointed with special reference to Wales.
Captain G. F. Gracey, Save the Children's Fund.
Mr. Gordon Green, Fairbridge Farm School.
Mr. W. A. F. Hepburn, O.B.E., M.C., LL.D., Director of Education for Ayrshire, also appointed with special reference to Scotland.
Reverend S. W. Hughes, Free Church Council.
Reverend Canon H. E. Hyde, Church of England Council for Empire Settlement.
Miss M. F. Jobson, J.P., Member of Fife Education Authority and County Council; also appointed with special reference to Scotland.
Miss E. A. Jones, M.A., Headmistresses' Association.
Mr. P. J. Kirkpatrick, Dr. Barnardo's Homes (Thomas John Barnardo).
Mr. Harold Legat, Boy Scouts' Association (The Scout Association).
The Right Honourable Sir Ronald Lindsay, G.C.B., G.C.M.G., sometime His Majesty's Ambassador to Washington.
Mr. W. A. Markham, M.A., Member of Executive National Children's Home and Orphanage.
Mrs. Norman, Vice-Chairman, Women's Voluntary Services.
Mrs. E. Parker, Ex-President, National Union of Teachers.
Dr. Donald Paterson, M.D., F.R.C.P., Physician, Great Ormond Street Hospital.
Miss Gladys Pott, C.B.E., ex-Chairman of Executive of Society for Overseas Settlement of British Women.
Mr. Brendan Quin, 1820 Memorial Settlement.
Sir William Reardon Smith, Baronet, an authority on shipping; also appointed with special reference to Wales.
Miss Edith Thompson, C.B.E., Chairman of Executive, Society for the Overseas Settlement of British Women.

A Scottish Advisory Council for CORB was also appointed, which met at 27, St. Andrew's Square, Edinburgh 2.

The Right Honourable the Lord Provost of Glasgow, P. J. Dollan, Esq., (Chairman).
Mr. Joseph Westwood, M.P., Parliamentary Under-Secretary of State for Scotland. (also attended London HQ meetings)
Mr. A. L. Fletcher, B.A., former Director of Education for the County of Midlothian.
Miss Mary Tweedie, former Headmistress of the Edinburgh Ladies' College (The Mary Erskine School).
Mrs. McNab Shaw, a member of the Ayr County Council.
Miss Margaret Jobson, J.P., a member of the Fife County Council, and Fife Education Authority, (also attended London HQ meetings).
Mr. W. A. F. Hepburn, O.B.E., M.C., LL.D., Director of Education for Ayrshire, (also attended London HQ meetings).
A representative of the Quarrier's Homes, Bridge of Weir, who was appointed.

== See also ==
- Evacuations of civilians in Britain during World War II
- National Museums Liverpool
- The National Archives: Evacuation to Canada
- BBC MEMORIES OF A C.O.R.B. (CHILDREN'S OVERSEAS RECEPTION BOARD) EVACUEE 1940 - 1944:
- IWM THE STORY OF CHILD EVACUEE BERYL MYATT AND THE SINKING OF THE SS CITY OF BENARES:
- Keep Calm and Carry On?: Examining WWII Great Britain through the Lens of Overseas Evacuation:
- Oceans Apart: the stories of overseas evacuees in World War Two, Penny Starns, The History press, 2014, ISBN 978-0-7524-9011-3
- Thomas Cook Archive: *Thomas Cook's Archives, Westpoint, Peterborough Business Park, Lynch Wood, Peterborough, PE2 6FZ, Archivist: Paul Smith The company ceased trading in September 2019, and the archived moved to, Company archive: The Thomas Cook Archive has been transferred to the Record Office for Leicestershire, Leicester and Rutland in Long Street, Wigston Magna, Leicestershire, LE18 2AH as of January 2020

== Sources ==
- The People’s War: Britain 1939-45, (1969) Angus Calder, Jonathan Cape Ltd., London
- The Home Front: Witness History, (1990) Stewart Ross, Hodder Wayland
- Innocents Abroad: Story of British Child Evacuees in Australia, 1940–45, (1994) Edward Stokes, Allen & Unwin
- The Absurd and the Brave: CORB, The True Account of the British Government's World War II Evacuation of Children Overseas, (1990) Michael Fethney, The Book Guild, Lewes
- A History of the Twentieth Century, Vol. 2 1933-54, (1998) Martin Gilbert, William Morrow and Company, Inc. New York
- Children of the Doomed Voyage, (2005) Janet Menzies, John Wiley & Sons (story of the tragedy of the SS City of Benares)
- Thomas Cook, 150 Years of Popular Tourism, (1991) Piers Brendon, Secker & Warbug, London, pages 278-9
- The Singing Ship: an odyssey of evacuee children, Meta Maclean, Angus and Robertson, Sydney. 1941, (MS Batory)
- HANSARD 1940, Commons Sitting, DOMINIONS OFFICE, CHILDREN'S OVERSEAS RECEPTION SCHEME.HC Deb 2 July 1940 vol 362 cc699-760
- HM Queen Elizabeth, The Queen Mother 1900-2002 (The Churchill Centre)
- Canada’s Immigration Museum, Pier 21 Halifax (SS Oronsay, SS Antonia, SS Duchess of York)
- The National Archives (SS Llanstephan Castle)
- WW2 Peoples memory Archives collected by the BBC (RMS Llanstephan Castle) l
- Imperial War Museum, London Collections
- The Wartime Memories Project - Evacuees
