= Almog (given name) =

Almog (Hebrew: אַלְמוֹג) is a Hebrew surname literally meaning "coral". Notable people with the given name Almog include:

- Almog Buzaglo (born 1992), Israeli footballer
- Almog Cohen (footballer) (born 1988), Israeli footballer
- Almog Cohen (politician) (born 1988), Israeli politician, former police officer
- Almog Ohayon (born 1994), Israeli professional footballer
- Almog Shiloni (died 2014), sergeant of the IDF stabbed to death in 2014

== See also ==
- Almog (surname)
