= Children in the Holocaust =

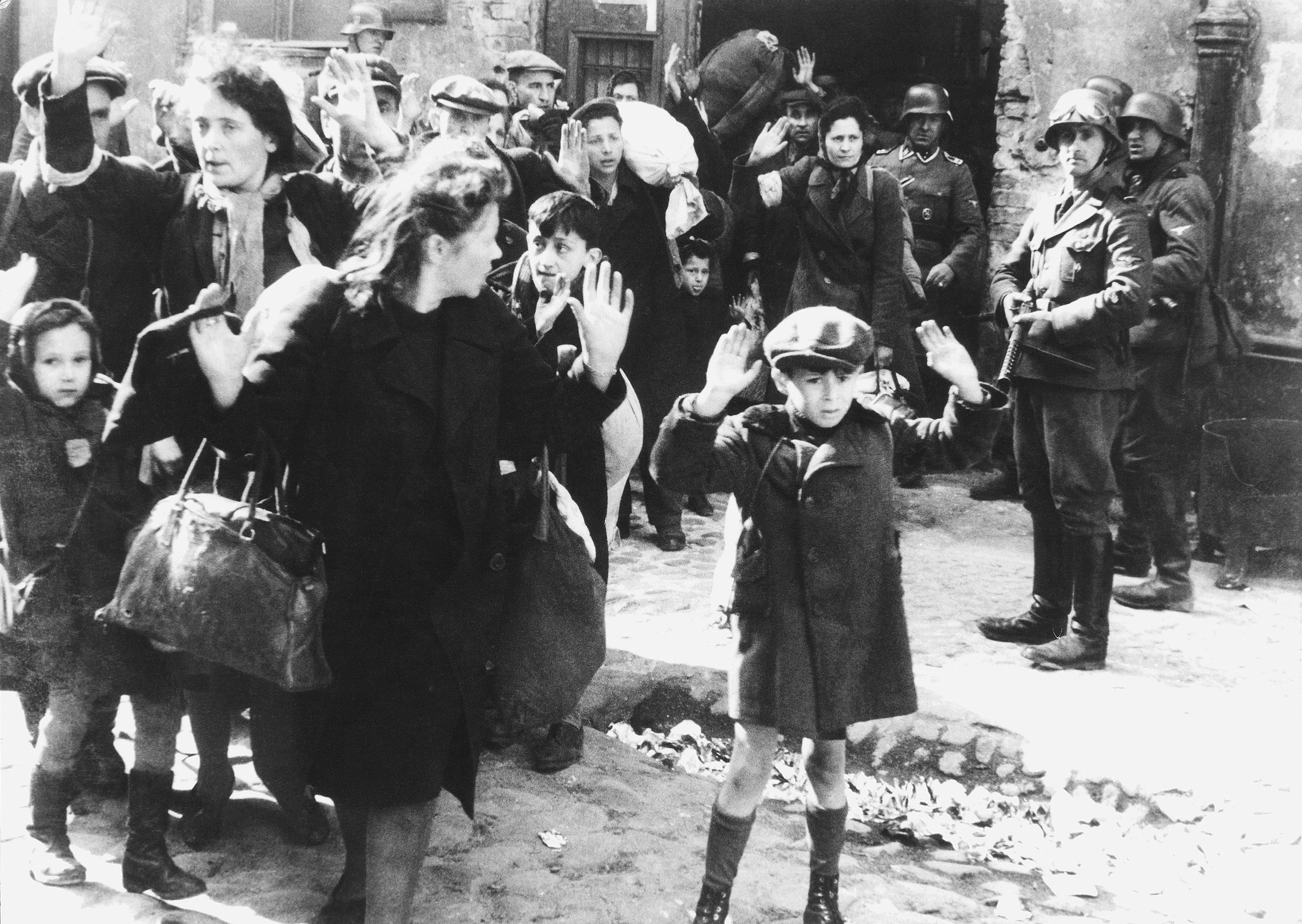
- Warsaw Ghetto boy, perhaps the most iconic photograph representing children in the Holocaust

During the Holocaust, children were especially vulnerable to death under the Nazi regime. An estimated 1.5 million children, nearly all Jewish, were murdered during the Holocaust, either directly by or as a direct consequence of Nazi actions. This was among the most notable Nazi crimes against children.

The Nazis advocated killing children of unwanted or "dangerous" people in accordance with their ideological views, either as part of the Nazi idea of the racial struggle or as a measure of preventive security. They particularly targeted Jewish children, but also targeted ethnically Polish children and Romani (also called Gypsy) children and children with mental or physical disabilities. The Nazis and their collaborators killed children for these ideological reasons and in retaliation for real or alleged partisan attacks. Early killings were encouraged by the Nazis in Aktion T4, where children with disabilities were gassed using carbon monoxide, starved to death, given phenol injections to the heart, or hanged.

A much smaller number were saved. Some simply survived, often in a ghetto, occasionally in a concentration camp. Some were saved in various programs like the Kindertransport and the One Thousand Children, in both of which children fled their homelands. Other children were saved by becoming Hidden Children. During and even before the war, many vulnerable children were rescued by Œuvre de Secours aux Enfants (OSE).

== Medical experimentation ==
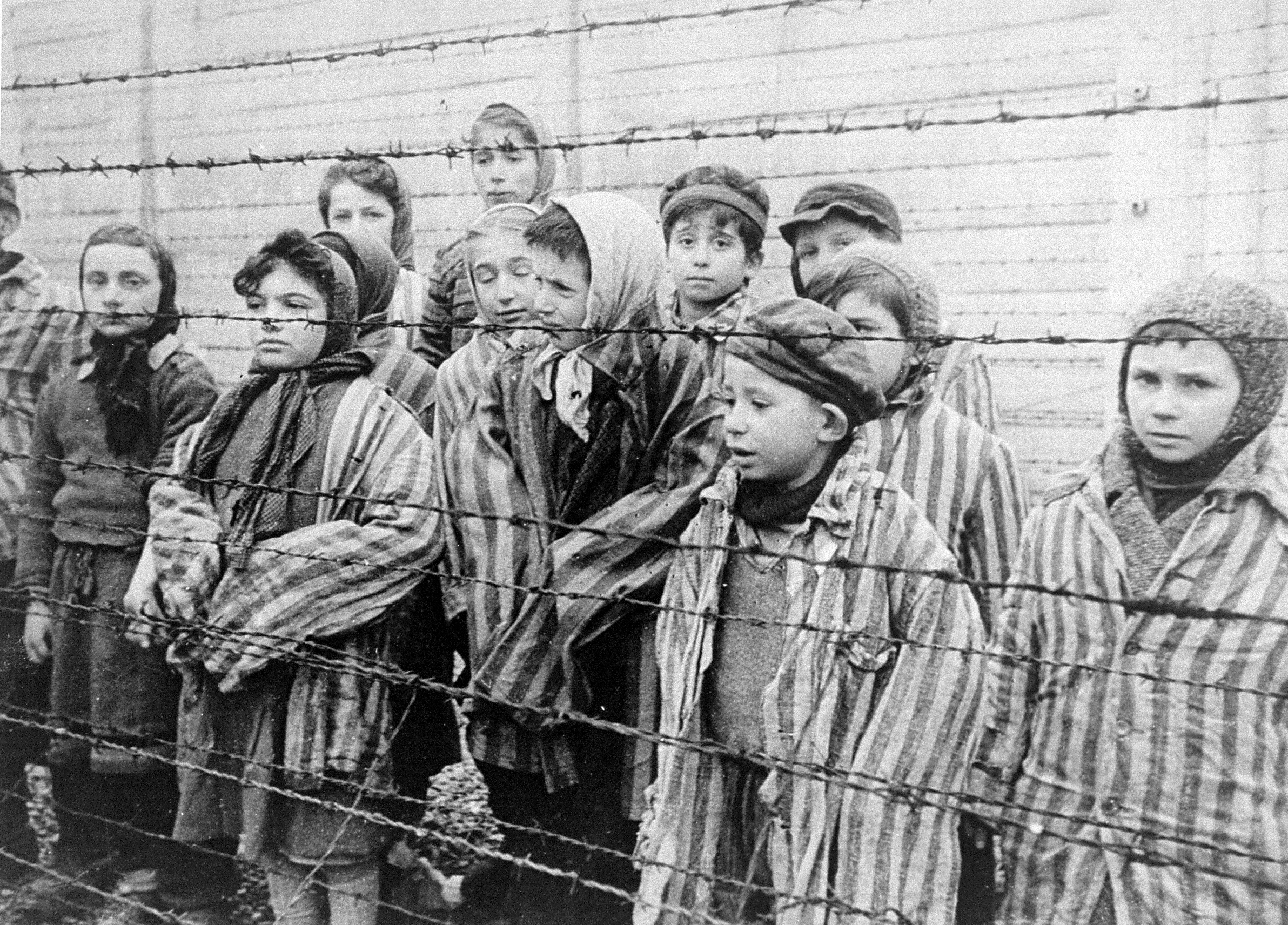
Jewish twins kept alive to be used in Mengele's medical experiments. These children were liberated from Auschwitz by the Red Army in January 1945.

The German authorities also incarcerated a number of children in concentration camps and transit camps. Physicians and medical researchers of the Schutzstaffel (SS), a Nazi paramilitary organization, used children, especially twins, in concentration camps for medical experiments that often resulted in the deaths of the children. In their "search to retrieve 'Aryan blood'", or the perfect race, SS race experts ordered hundreds of children in occupied Poland and the occupied parts of the Soviet Union to be kidnapped and transferred to the Reich to be adopted by racially suitable German families. Although the basis for these decisions was "race-scientific," often blond hair, blue eyes, or fair skin was sufficient to merit the "opportunity" to be "Germanized." On the other hand, female Poles and Soviet civilians who had been deported to Germany for forced labor were often forced into sexual relations with a German man; many cases resulted in pregnancy, and the women were forced to have abortions or to bear their children under conditions that would ensure the infant's death, if the race experts determined that the child would have insufficient German blood.

Josef Mengele was a physician who worked at Auschwitz, a concentration camp. His research subjects were better fed and housed than other prisoners and temporarily safe from the gas chambers. He established a kindergarten for children who were the subjects of experiments, along with all Romani children under the age of six. The facility provided better food and living conditions than other areas of the camp and even included a playground. When visiting his child subjects, he introduced himself as "Uncle Mengele" and offered them sweets. However, he was also personally responsible for the deaths of an unknown number of victims. Author Robert Jay Lifton describes Mengele as sadistic, lacking empathy, and extremely anti-Semitic, claiming that he believed that the Jews should be eliminated entirely as an inferior and dangerous race. Mengele's son Rolf said that his father showed no remorse for his wartime activities. A lack of regulations on his experiments allowed Mengele to perform his experiments freely.

A former Auschwitz prisoner doctor said:

He was capable of being so kind to the children, to have them become fond of him, to bring them sugar, to think of small details in their daily lives, and to do things we would genuinely admire ... And then, next to that, ... the crematoria smoke, and these children, tomorrow or in a half-hour, he is going to send them there. Well, that is where the anomaly lay.

Mengele had a fascination with twins. He was interested in the difference between identical and fraternal twins as well as how genetic diseases affected them and where they originated. The experiments also distinguished between genetic traits and those developed by the environment of the child. Mengele was known to pretend to be off duty while a train of new prisoners arrived so that he could personally select any twins whom he saw. He operated on children, partly to find genetic weaknesses in the makeup of Jewish or Romani people in order to provide scientific evidence for the ideas of the Nazi party. Mengele hypothesized that his subjects were particularly vulnerable to certain diseases because of their race. In addition to that, he believed that they had degenerative blood and tissue based on his samples. Mengele or one of his assistants subjected twins to weekly examinations and measurements of their physical attributes. He performed experiments such as unnecessary amputation of limbs; in another experiment, he intentionally infected a twin with typhus or another disease and transfused the blood of the infected twin into the other one. Many of his subjects died while undergoing these procedures. After an experiment was over, the twins were sometimes killed and their bodies dissected. Miklós Nyiszli, a prisoner at Auschwitz, recalled one occasion where Mengele personally killed fourteen twins in one night through a chloroform injection to the heart. If one twin died of disease, Mengele killed the other so that comparative reports could be prepared after their deaths.

He was known for experimenting with eyes. One of his particular studies regarded heterochromia iridum, a condition where people's eyes are differently colored. After he killed heterochromatics, he removed their eyes and sent them to Berlin for study. Another of Mengele's experiments with eyes involved attempts to change eye color by injecting chemicals into the eyes of living subjects. His experiments on dwarfs and people with physical abnormalities included taking physical measurements, drawing blood, extracting healthy teeth, and treatment with unnecessary drugs and X-rays. Many of the victims were sent to the gas chambers after about two weeks, and their skeletons were sent to Berlin for further study. Mengele sought pregnant women, on whom he would perform experiments before sending them to gas chambers. Witness Vera Alexander described how he sewed two Romani twins together back-to-back in an attempt to create conjoined twins. The children died of gangrene after several days of suffering.

== Concentration camps ==
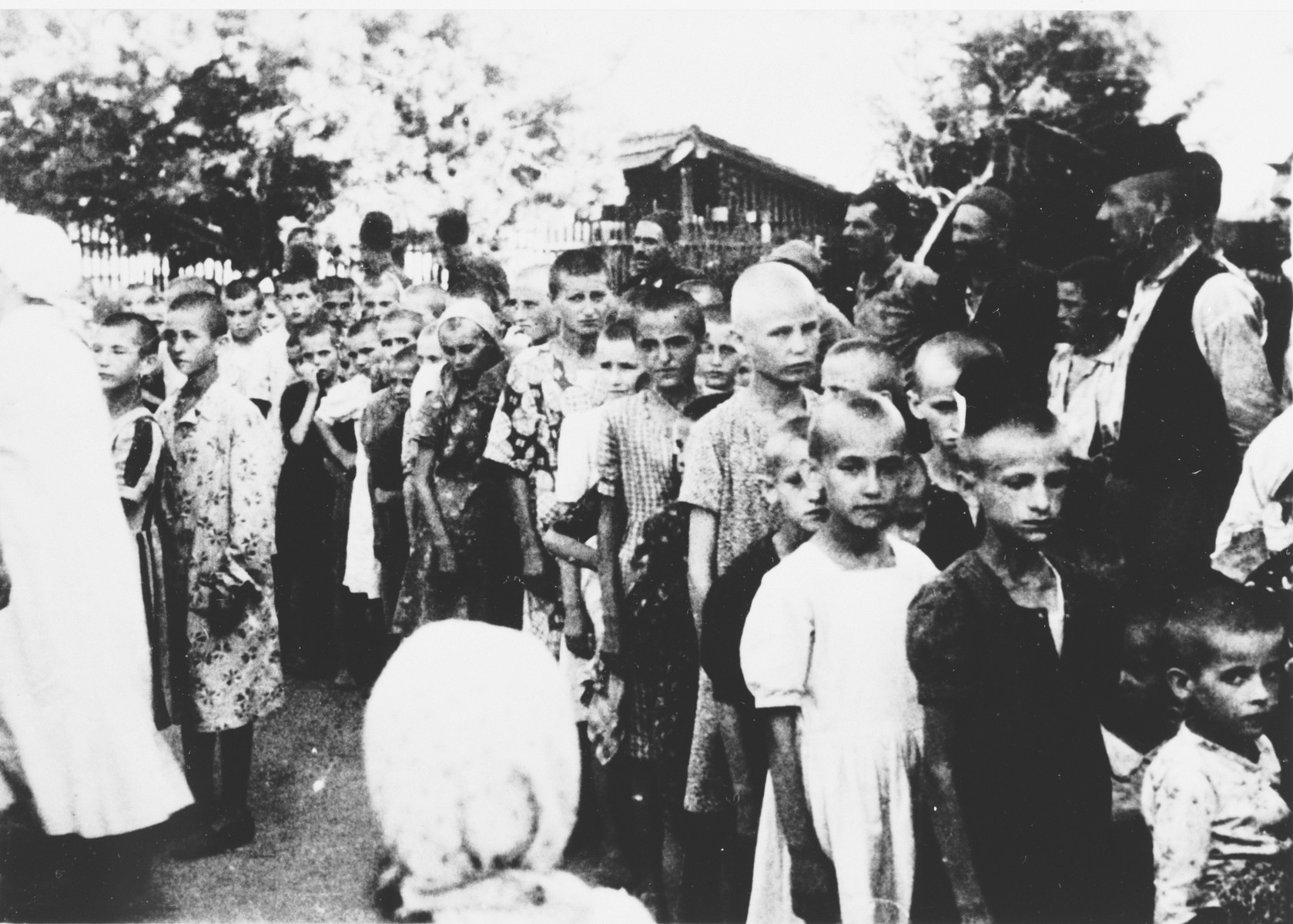
A group of children wait in line at an Ustaša concentration camp

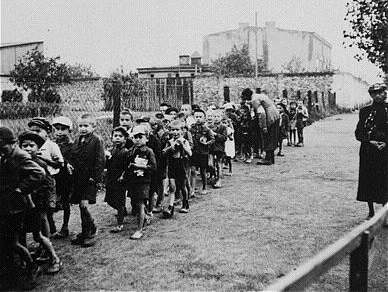
Children rounded up for deportation to the Chełmno extermination camp.

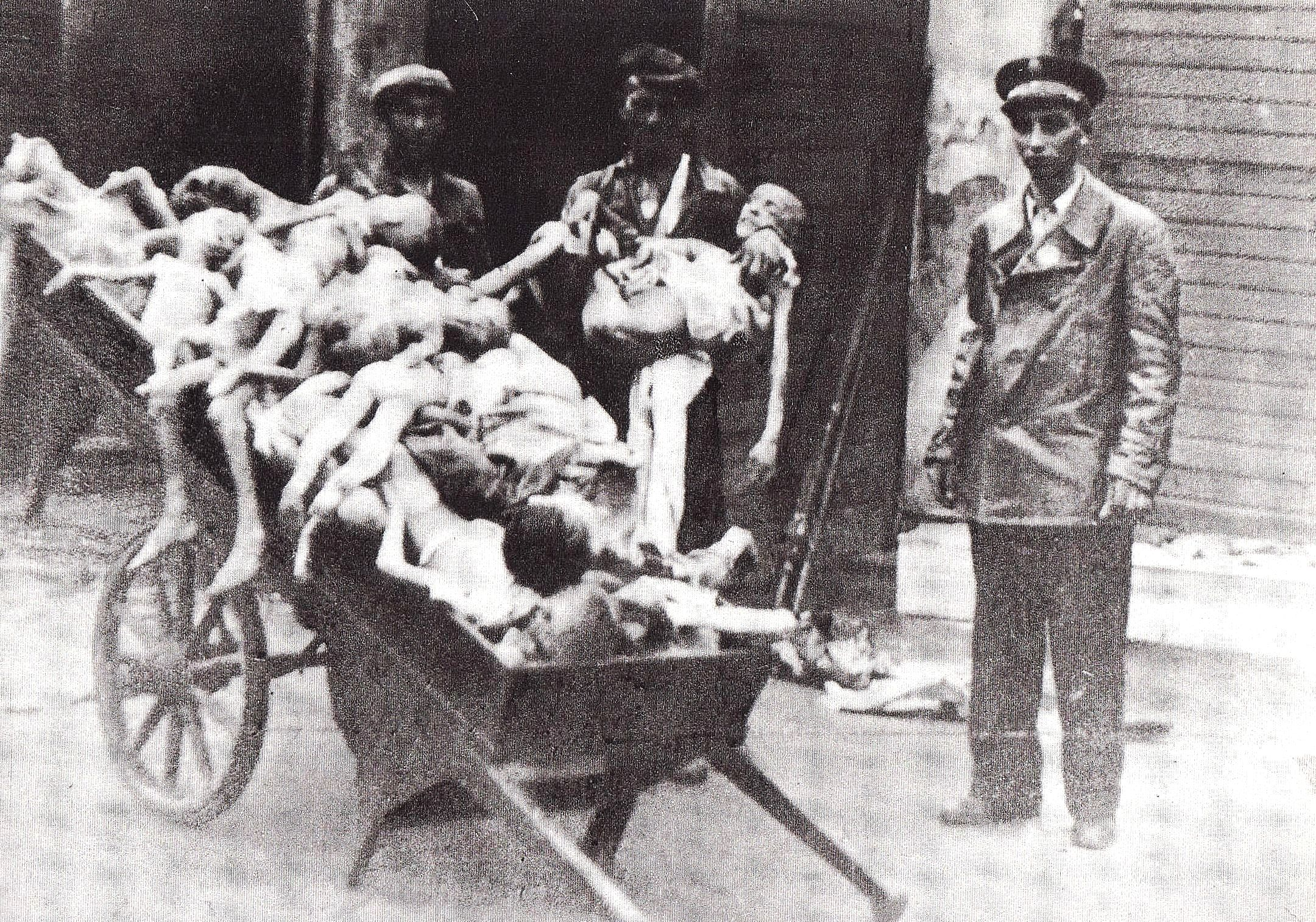
Emaciated corpses of children in the Warsaw Ghetto

During the existence of the Independent State of Croatia during World War II, the Croatian Ustaše established numerous concentration camps like those in Jasenovac, Đakovo, and Jastrebarsko in which many Serbian, Jewish, and Romani children died as inmates. Among them, there was Sisak concentration camp, which was specially formed for children as part of Jasenovac concentration camp.

Sisak children's concentration camp was founded on 3 August 1942 following the Kozara Offensive. It was part of an assembly camp, officially named the "Refugee Transit Camp". This concentration camp consisted of a special part officially called the "Shelter for the Refugee Children" under the auspices of the "Ustasha Female Lineage" and "Ustasha Security Service", and under the direct control of Antun Najžer. The camp was located in several buildings in Sisak: the former Yugoslav Falconry Association ("Sokolana"), the Sisters of St. Vincent nunnery, a rice warehouse, Rajs Saltworks warehouse, Novi Sisak elementary school, and the "Karantena" (Quarantine). All these buildings were considered unsuitable for the housing of children. For example, in the Falconry Association, there were no doors; it was drafty because it was built for drying salt. Children, even those who were only a few months old, had to lie on the floor with only a thin layer of straw without any clothes or blankets. When a typhus epidemic broke out, Najžer ordered the transfer of the infected children to an improvised hospital, only serving to increase the number of deaths.

The first group of children arrived on 3 August 1942; there were 906 of them. The very next day another group of 650 children was brought; a third group arrived on 6 August with 1,272 children. In Teslic glasshouse and the newly built barracks, which were named "Karantena", a general concentration camp for men, women, and children had been established. During August and September 1942, Ustaše took parents away from 3,971 children by sending the parents to forced labor. From August 1942 to 8 February 1943, there were 6,693 detained children, mostly Serbs from Kozara, Kordun, and Slavonia. Despite the actions of Diana Budisavljević and a group of humanitarians – Jana Koh, Vera Luketić, Dragica Habazin, Ljubica and Vera Becić, Kamil Bresler, Ante Dumbović, and the sisters of the Red Cross – up to 40 children died every day. Lazar Margulješ testified about conditions at the concentration camp:

I've noticed that the food parcels sent by Red Cross have never been given to the imprisoned children. My duty as a medic was to research these small prisoners, therefore I often visited these places: Sokolana building, where the children laid on bare concrete or, if they had little luck, on a little straw. The so-called hospital, in a small school in Old Sisak, had no beds so the children were lying on the floor with a little distracted and contaminated straw matted with blood and excrement and covered with swarms of flies.

Jana Koh, former secretary of Croatian Red Cross stated following about the conditions in the Camp:

The barracks were connected by the corridors guarded by the Ustashas. Not far from the ambulance, from another barracks, the sad cries of the children were heard. There was set, on the bare floor, four hundred children: newborns, children from a few weeks or months, up to ten years of age. How many children came, and where they were dispatched, could no longer be found out. The children in the children's barracks cried inexorably and were calling their mothers, who were only a few steps away from the children, but the fascist criminals did not let mothers to approach their children. Older children tell us through tears, that they can not calm the little ones, because they are hungry, there are no one to change diapers of the little ones, and they are afraid that everyone will die. These children, who have not yet reached the age of ten, swear to us, "Come on, sister, bring us mothers, bring at least mothers to these little ones. You will see, if you do not bring them their mothers, they will suffocate, by the tears alone."

Coroner David Egić officially recorded that out of 6,693 children, 1,152 died in the Camp, while teacher Ante Dumbović later claimed that the number was 1,630.

== Means of survival ==
In spite of their acute vulnerability, many children discovered ways to survive. Children smuggled food and medicine into the ghettos, in turn smuggling out their own personal possessions to trade for said goods. Children in youth movements later escaped the ghettos to join underground resistance activities such as Soviet partisan units; others formed their own units to harass the German occupiers. Many children escaped with parents or other relatives to family camps run by Jewish partisans; others had to escape on their own.

Many Jewish children were forced to fake their identity for their own safety. They obtained false identity papers that usually came from anti-Nazi resistance in order to pretend to be Aryans. Even though this was one of the only ways to survive for children, it imposed major security risks. The police and other Nazi authorities closely examined documents in their search for Jews to detect disguised Jews.

Circumcision, a Jewish tradition in which the foreskins of infant male Jews are removed, was an easy way to identify Jews because non-Jews usually did not go through the procedure. Boys had to be mindful about using public restrooms and participating in team sports because their Jewish identity could be exposed. As a solution, they had to go through additional procedures that would hide circumcision or at times even dress up as girls.

Between 1938 and 1939, the Kindertransport (Children's Transport) was a rescue effort organized by the British government in cooperation with Jewish organizations. It brought about 10,000 refugee Jewish children to safety in Great Britain from Nazi Germany and German-occupied territories, although their families did not come with them. Likewise, Youth Aliyah (Youth Immigration) was responsible for integrating thousands of children into life in Palestine for their survival as well as the revitalization of the Yishuv, the Jewish settlement in Palestine.

In the United States, some individuals attempted to help, and efforts around the country allowed the rescue of 1,000 Jewish children from Nazis. Unlike the English work, the actual rescue efforts were not backed up by the government in any way; those who wanted to help had to find their own ways to fight immigration quotas. Gilbert and Eleanor Kraus were a couple who brought 50 Jewish children to the United States to save them from Nazis in 1939 before the war started. They selected the 50 children by interviewing their families, who were close to obtaining a US visa. Most of the children, who had moved to Philadelphia, were eventually reunited with their families. Inspired by the Kindertransport, Congress was urged to allow up to 100,000 Jewish children to come to America. In 1939, the Wagner-Rogers Bill was proposed, which was to admit 20,000 unaccompanied Jewish child refugees under the age of 14 into the United States. However, in February 1939, the bill failed to get Congressional approval.

Meanwhile, some non-Jews hid Jewish children; sometimes, as in the case of Anne Frank, they hid other family members as well. In some cases the Jews were actually hidden; in other cases, they were adopted into the family of their "hider". A unique case of hiding occurred in France. Almost the entire Protestant population of Le Chambon-sur-Lignon, as well as many Catholic priests, nuns, and laymen, hid Jewish children in the town from 1942 to 1944. In Italy and Belgium, many children survived in hiding.

In Belgium, the Christian organization Jeunesse Ouvrière Chrétienne hid Jewish children and teenagers with the backing of the Queen-Mother Elisabeth of Belgium.

After the surrender of Nazi Germany, which ended World War II, refugees and displaced persons searched throughout Europe for missing children. Thousands of orphaned children were displaced in camps. Many surviving Jewish children fled eastern Europe as part of the mass exodus (Brihah) to the western zones of occupied Germany en route to the Yishuv. Youth Aliyah continued its activities after the war by helping child survivors to move to Palestine, which soon became the state of Israel in 1948.

== Jewish children ==
=== Segregation in schools ===
On April 25, 1933, the Nazi regime enacted the "Law Against Overcrowding in German Schools and Universities" which began school segregation for Jewish children and young adults. This law restricted the number of Jewish children who could enroll in public schools to 1.5 percent of the total school population. However, when the Jewish population in the surrounding area was greater than 5 percent, 5 percent of the school population could be Jewish. Additionally, many Jewish children were eligible for exemptions, allowing them to circumvent the law. These exemptions applied to Jewish children of mixed marriage, those with fathers who served in World War I, and those with foreign citizenship. Despite the increased eligibility of Jewish children and young adults as a result of the exemptions, many Jewish students older than 14 left the school system, as school was not required past this age. For example, in Württemberg, 58 percent of the Jewish student population at higher schools left, despite the 1933 law only applying to 10 percent of the students. This highlights how many Jewish students left the public school system by choice in order to escape the increasingly antisemitic school environment. The growing hostility towards Jewish children is reflected by the fact that Jewish students received worse grades than their peers, regardless of the quality of their work. Additionally, teachers forbade Jewish students from participating in school activities and incorporated elements of the Nazi ideology in their classrooms, such as the use of anti-Semitic terms in class. As a result of the antagonistic atmosphere in the classroom, many Jewish students faced isolation from their former friends.

Eventually many German Jews enrolled their children in Jewish schools in order to prevent persecution in the classroom. Consequently, the number of children enrolled in Jewish schools increased from 14 percent in 1932 to 60 percent in 1937. Additionally, within the span of two years, the number of Jewish schools increased from 130 in 1935 to 167 in 1937. The increase in Jewish schools as well as the student population at such schools highlights the shift away from public schools and towards private schools in the German Jewish community. Although the Jewish community generally shifted towards private schools, German Jews continued to attend public schools until November 15, 1938 when the Reich Minister of Education banned all Jewish students from German public schools.

=== Ghettos ===
German forces established ghettos early in the war in many Polish towns and cities such as Warsaw and Łódź. In them, Jewish children died from starvation and exposure as well as lack of adequate clothing and shelter. The German authorities were indifferent to this mass death because they considered most of the younger ghetto children to be unproductive and hence "useless eaters". Strict control was enforced over the inhabitants of the ghettos, and the food provided was deliberately limited. From 1942 onwards, the ghetto program ended. Inhabitants of the ghettos were murdered at various death camps. Because children were generally too young to be deployed as forced labor, they were particularly vulnerable to being killed: they were one of the main groups in the first deportations to killing centers or in mass shootings near mass graves along with the elderly, the ill, and the disabled. Children who were healthy enough for labor were often worked to death doing jobs to benefit the camp; other times, children were forced to do unnecessary jobs like digging ditches. In July 1945, Judge Stanisław Żmuda interviewed a former Auschwitz concentration camp prisoner, who stated that the younger children who arrived at the camp were burned alive.

=== Transit camps ===
Transit camps were temporary stops on the way to concentration camps during the Holocaust. Many children were brought with their families to transit camps, unsure of what awaited them. Some hoped for starting a new life and making friends in the camps, while many others were scared. Children brought to the transit camps came from many different backgrounds. In the transit camps, children were surrounded by bare bodies. Their beds were merely metal frames. There was a lack of food along with a fear of trains coming for deportation. No school supplies were provided. Children began to see their relatives in a different light because each family member dealt with various hardships in the transit camps. Children had few resources at the transit camps to foster growth. A group of Hungarian Zionists made a rescue committee to negotiate and prevent deportations. Older girls took care of young children. Physicians, nurses, and musicians organized lectures, concerts, and activities for children. Voluntary interns and philanthropic organizations supplied food, clothing, and organized secretive teaching rooms to help the children continue their education. Childcare workers taught children about the ideas of Zionism and the spirit of democracy; they additionally encouraged an affectionate atmosphere. These groups also helped ease the hunger issues in the camps. A notorious case of the Nazis holding a child in a transit camp is the case of Anne Frank and her sister in Bergen-Belsen. Other notable cases include the children held in the Majdanek concentration camp, some of whom were orphaned because their parents were killed in anti-partisan operations.

== Non-Jewish children ==
Non-Jewish children from other groups were targeted during the Holocaust. In the Auschwitz concentration camp, Romani children were killed. Meanwhile, five to seven thousand children died as victims of a euthanasia program. Others were murdered in reprisals, including most of the children of Lidice; many children in villages in the occupied parts of the Soviet Union were killed with their parents.

=== Jehovah's Witnesses ===
Unlike Jews and Romani, who were persecuted on the basis of their ethnicity, Jehovah's Witnesses could escape persecution and personal harm by signing a document indicating renunciation of their faith, submission to state authority, and support of the German military. Approximately 800 children of Jehovah's Witnesses were taken away from their families. Witness children typically expressed defiance to the Nazi regime's attempts to make them act against their beliefs. They were often expelled from public schools due to their refusal to say "Heil Hitler". Some children were sent to reeducation centers, while others were adopted by families in good standing with the Nazi regime.

== See also ==
- Bullenhuser Damm
- CENTOS (charity)
- Kidnapping of Eastern European children by Nazi Germany
- Nicholas Winton
- Janusz Korczak
- Białystok children
- One Thousand Children
- Kindertransport
- Hidden children during the Holocaust
- Unzere kinder
- Nazi crimes against children

== Sources ==
- Astor, Gerald (1985). Last Nazi: Life and Times of Dr Joseph Mengele. New York: Donald I. Fine. ISBN 978-0-917657-46-7.
- Brozan, Nadine (15 November 1982). "Out of Death, a Zest for Life". The New York Times.
- Hillen, Aiko; Hytry, Albert, eds. (2026). "Children and Childhood in the Holocaust in the Occupied Eastern Territories". Eastern European Holocaust Studies. 4 (1). De Gruyter Brill.
- Kubica, Helena (1998) [1994]. "The Crimes of Josef Mengele". In Gutman, Yisrael; Berenbaum, Michael (eds.). Anatomy of the Auschwitz Death Camp. Bloomington, Indiana: Indiana University Press. pp. 317–337. ISBN 978-0-253-20884-2.
- Lagnado, Lucette Matalon; Dekel, Sheila Cohn (1991). Children of the Flames: Dr Josef Mengele and the Untold Story of the Twins of Auschwitz. New York: William Morrow. ISBN 978-0-688-09695-3.
- Lifton, Robert Jay (21 July 1985). "What Made This Man? Mengele". The New York Times.
- Lifton, Robert Jay (1986). The Nazi Doctors: Medical Killing and the Psychology of Genocide. New York: Basic Books. ISBN 978-0-465-04905-9.
- Mozes-Kor, Eva (1992). "Mengele Twins and Human Experimentation: A Personal Account". In Annas, George J.; Grodin, Michael A. (eds.). The Nazi Doctors and the Nuremberg Code: Human Rights in Human Experimentation. New York: Oxford University Press. pp. 53–59. ISBN 978-0-19-510106-5.
- Nyiszli, Miklós (2011) [1960]. Auschwitz: a doctor's eyewitness account. New York: Arcade Pub. ISBN 978-1-61145-011-8.
- Posner, Gerald L.; Ware, John (1986). Mengele: The Complete Story. New York: McGraw-Hill. ISBN 978-0-07-050598-8.
- Reynaud, Michel; Graffard, Sylvie (2001). The Jehovah's Witnesses and the Nazis: Persecution, Deportation and Murder. Cooper Square Press. ISBN 0-8154-1076-X.
