= HIAS =

Jewish American nonprofit organization

HIAS, Inc.
- Founded: November 27, 1881; 144 years ago
- Founded at: New York City, U.S.
- Tax ID no.: 13-5633307
- Legal status: 501(c)(3) nonprofit organization
- Purpose: Drawing on our Jewish values and history, and working with host communities, HIAS provides vital services to refugees, asylum seekers, and other forcibly displaced and stateless persons around the world and advocates for their fundamental rights so they can rebuild their lives.
- Headquarters: Silver Spring, Maryland, United States
- Interim CEO: David Weiss
- Chair of the board: Tamar Newberger
- Subsidiaries: Charitable Remainder Unitrust
- Revenue: $39,923,260 (2014)
- Expenses: $36,449,447 (2014)
- Website: hias.org
- Formerly called: Hebrew Sheltering Aid Society; Hebrew Sheltering and Immigrant Aid Society; Hebrew Immigrant Aid Society; United HIAS Service, Inc.; Association for the Protection of Jewish Immigrants

HIAS, founded as the Hebrew Immigrant Aid Society, is an international Jewish humanitarian nonprofit organization that provides services to refugees, asylum seekers, displaced people, and immigrants. It was established between 1881 and 1903 to help Eastern European Jewish immigrants to the United States escape antisemitic persecution and violence. In 1975, the State Department asked HIAS to aid in resettling Vietnam refugees. Since that time, the organization has continued to provide support for refugees of all nationalities, religions, and ethnic origins.

Working with host communities, HIAS works with refugees, asylum seekers, and other forcibly displaced and stateless persons. HIAS has offices in the United States and across Latin America, Europe, Africa, and the Middle East. Since its inception, HIAS has helped resettle more than 4.5 million people.

== Name ==
According to HIAS, the acronym HIAS was first used as a telegraphic address and eventually became the universally used name of the organization. A 1909 merger with the Hebrew Sheltering Aid Society resulted in the official name Hebrew Sheltering and Immigrant Aid Society, but the organization continued to be generally known as "H.I.A.S." or more usually as "HIAS", which eventually became the official name.

== History ==
The Hebrew Immigrant Aid Society was established on November 27, 1881, originally to help the large number of Eastern European Jewish immigrants to the United States who had left Europe to escape antisemitic persecution and violence. (Note: Up to 2013, HIAS's web site gave no founding date but stated that the organization was operating since at least 1891. The site now gives the foundation date of 1881. Lawrence J. Epstein has written that the Hebrew Immigrant Aid Society was founded in 1904; several other sources give a date of 1902. An article in the Chicago Inter Ocean announced the organization's founding in 1881, and The Baltimore Sun mentioned the Hebrew Immigrant Aid Society in an article published in 1882. HIAS has reported its date of formation as 1881 on its annual return with the Internal Revenue Service.) J. Harwood Menken was its first president. The organization merged with the Hebrew Sheltering House Association, which had been founded in New York earlier that year.

In 1904, HIAS established a formal bureau on Ellis Island, the primary arrival point of European immigrants to the United States at that time.

In March 1909, the Hebrew Immigrant Aid Society merged with the Hebrew Sheltering House Association to form the Hebrew Sheltering and Immigrant Aid Society, which continued to be widely known as HIAS. By 1914, HIAS had branches in Baltimore, Philadelphia, Boston, and an office in Washington, D.C.

In 1891, Jewish residents of Moscow, St. Petersburg, and Kyiv were expelled and many came to the United States; beginning in 1892, Ellis Island was the point of entry for most of these new arrivals. In the half-century following the establishment of a formal Ellis Island bureau in 1904, HIAS helped more than 100,000 Jewish immigrants who might otherwise have been turned away. They provided translation services, guided immigrants through medical screening and other procedures, argued before the Boards of Special Enquiry to prevent deportations, lent needy Jews the $25 landing fee, and obtained bonds for others guaranteeing their employable status. The Society was active on the island facilitating legal entry, reception, and immediate care for the newly arrived.

HIAS also searched for relatives of detained immigrants in order to secure the necessary affidavits of support to guarantee that the new arrivals would not become public charges. Lack of such affidavits and/or material means impacted a large number of immigrants: of the 900 immigrants detained during one month in 1917, 600 were held because they had neither money nor friends to claim them. Through advertising and other methods, the society was able to locate relatives for the vast majority of detainees, who in a short time were released from Ellis Island.

Many of the Jews traveling in steerage on the steamship lines across the Atlantic refused the non-kosher food served on their journeys and arrived at Ellis Island malnourished and vulnerable to deportation on medical grounds. In 1911, the Society installed a kosher kitchen on the Island. Between 1925 and 1952, HIAS' kosher kitchen provided more than a half million meals to immigrants; in the peak year, 1940, 85,794 meals were served. The Society also provided religious services and musical concerts at Ellis Island. It ran an employment bureau and sold railroad tickets at reduced rates to immigrants headed for other cities.

In the summer of 1911, HIAS set up an Oriental Department to meet the growing needs of immigrants from the Balkans and Near East, who began arriving in the U.S. in considerable numbers. Between 1908 and 1913, approximately 10,000 Jewish emigrants left the Middle East for the U.S.

During this period, resettlement of Jewish immigrants included assistance in obtaining U.S. citizenship. For this a rudimentary knowledge of English and familiarity with American institutions were mandatory. In addition to classes given at its own building, HIAS arranged educational courses for the immigrants through a network of local Jewish organizations. From 1909 to 1913, HIAS helped more than 35,000 new immigrants become naturalized citizens.

=== World War I ===
The outbreak of World War I in 1914 brought the largest influx of Jews from Eastern Europe to date: 138,051 in that year alone. However, when the North Atlantic became a battle zone and German submarines seriously impaired overseas passenger traffic, immigration numbers plunged. The war made it increasingly difficult for American-based families to maintain contact with their scattered family members behind enemy lines. To address this, HIAS sent one of its operatives to Europe to establish communications. He succeeded in securing permission from the German and Austro-Hungarian High Command for residents of the military zones to write short messages to their families to be distributed by HIAS in New York. HIAS also accepted and delivered messages sent by the zone's non-Jewish population. By war's end, HIAS had transmitted a total of 300,000 communications on behalf of separated families.

The Russian Revolution of 1917 – and the following civil war, famine, and pogroms that left about 50,000 Jews dead – created another surge of emigration from the former Russian Empire. HIAS continued to help these immigrants find safe haven despite growing anti-immigration sentiments in the U.S.

In 1918 HIAS sent a representative, Samuel Mason, on a mission to Japan, Manchuria and Vladivostok on behalf of thousands of European immigrants stranded in the Far East by the World War and the Russian Revolution. He established HIAS offices and international post offices and succeeded in helping both Jews and non-Jews on their journeys to new homes in the US and other countries. He also established The Central Information Bureau for Jewish War Sufferers in the Far East which worked with HIAS to help Jewish refugees in Shanghai through the end of World War II.

Between the years 1909 and 1919, HIAS registered 482,742 immigrants arriving in the U.S. HIAS' Ellis Island Bureau interceded with 28,884 held for special inquiry, of whom 22,780 were admitted based on second hearings, with only 6,104 deported. During this period HIAS facilitated the naturalization of 64,298 immigrants.

=== Between the wars ===
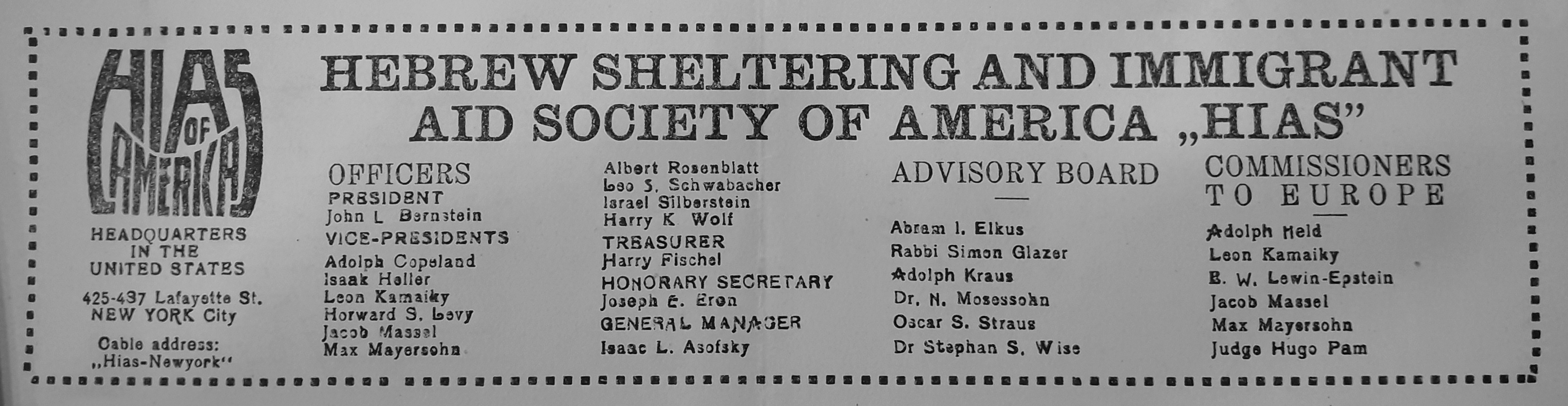
HIAS Hebrew Immigrant Aid Society, 1925

The dislocation and turmoil following World War I led to acts of anti-Semitism throughout the former war zone, especially in Poland, Romania, Russia, and Hungary. While other Jewish agencies, most notably the American Jewish Joint Distribution Committee ("The Joint"), supplied Jews in the affected countries with food, clothing, and medical supplies, HIAS created a worldwide network of Jewish organizations to provide assistance in immigration to the U.S., Canada, South America, Australia, and China.

The establishment of HICEM in 1927 proved critical to the later rescue operation that saved thousands of Jewish lives during World War II.

HICEM resulted from the merger of three Jewish migration associations: New York-based HIAS (Hebrew Immigrant Aid Society); Jewish Colonization Association (JCA), which was based in Paris but registered as a British charitable society; and Emigdirect (United Jewish Emigration Committee), a migration organization based in Berlin. HICEM is an acronym of these organizations' names.

The agreement between the three organizations stipulated that all local branches outside the U.S. would merge into HICEM, while HIAS would still deal with Jewish immigration to the U.S. However, Emigdirect was forced to withdraw from the merger in 1934, and British wartime regulations later restricted the JCA from using its funds outside Britain. Thus, for a while, HICEM was funded exclusively by HIAS and could be considered as its European extension.

In 1923, HIAS established the HIAS Immigrant Bank at 425 Lafayette Street in the NoHo neighborhood of Manhattan. The bank was licensed by the State of New York. Its sole purpose was to facilitate remittance or money transfers to and from immigrants' families abroad, which was then a service not offered by most U.S. banks.

=== World War II and the Holocaust ===
By the time World War II broke out in September 1939, HICEM had offices throughout Europe, South and Central America, and the Far East. Its employees advised and prepared European refugees for emigration, including helping them during their departure and arrival.

HICEM's European headquarters were in Paris. After Germany invaded and conquered France in mid-1940, HICEM closed its Paris offices. On June 26, 1940, two days after France capitulation the main HIAS-HICEM Paris Office was authorized by Portuguese ruler António de Oliveira Salazar to be transferred from Paris to Lisbon. Initially this action by Salazar was done against the will of the British Embassy in Lisbon. The British feared that this would make the Portuguese people less sympathetic with the allied cause. According to the Lisbon Jewish community, Salazar held Moisés Bensabat Amzalak, the leader of the Lisbon Jewish community in high esteem and that allowed Amzalak to play an important role in getting Salazar's permission to transfer from Paris to Lisbon the main HIAS European Office in June 1940.

The French office reopened in October 1940, first in Bordeaux, for a week, and finally in Marseilles in the so-called "free zone" of Vichy France. Until November 11, 1942, when the Germans occupied all of France, HICEM employees were at work in French internment camps, such as the infamous Gurs. HIAS looked for Jews who met U.S. State Department immigration requirements, and were ready to leave France. At the time of the German invasion of France, there were approximately 300,000 native and foreign Jews living in France; however, the State Department's policies curbing immigration meant that the number of applicants to America far exceeded the number allowed to leave.

When all legal emigration of Jews from France ceased, HICEM began to operate clandestinely from the town of Brive la Gaillarde. It had an office in the upper level of the building of the Synagogue led by Rabbi David Feuerwerker, the Rabbi of Brive. Here a small group of HICEM employees – establishing contact and cooperation with the local underground forces of the French resistance – succeeded in smuggling Jews out of France to Spain and Switzerland. Twenty-one HICEM employees were deported and killed in the concentration camps; others were killed in direct combat with the Nazis.

During this period, HICEM in France worked closely with HICEM in Lisbon. Lisbon, as a neutral port, was the path of choice for Jews escaping Europe to North and South America. Many of these fled from the Netherlands and Belgium and through France, or else started directly in France, and then were smuggled and climbed over the Pyrenees with "passeur" guides to Barcelona, and then by train through Madrid and finally to Lisbon. From Lisbon many refugee Jewish families sailed to America on the Serpa Pinto or its sister ship the Mouzinho.

In the main, HICEM (HIAS) helped intact or semi-intact families to flee. But, often together with Œuvre de secours aux enfants (OSE) or with the American Jewish Joint Distribution Committee ("the Joint" or JDCs), it also helped unaccompanied children to flee without their parents. At French concentration camps, such as the notorious Gurs, many of these children were officially allowed by the Nazis to leave but required to leave their parents in the camps. Those unaccompanied children who were forced to leave their parents behind, and who fled directly to the United States are part of the group known as the One Thousand Children (OTC) (which actually numbers about 1400). Nearly all the OTC parents were murdered by the Nazis.

Other rescue organizations also moved their European offices to Lisbon at that time, including "the Joint". They also included (the American Friends Service Committee (the Quakers) (see History of the Quakers).

From 1940 onward, HICEM's activities were partly supported by the Joint. Despite friction between the two organizations, they worked together to provide refugees with tickets and information about visas and transportation, and helped them leave Lisbon on neutral Portuguese ships, mainly, as already stated above, the Serpa Pinto and the Mouzinho. In all, some 40,000 Jews managed to escape Europe during the Holocaust with HICEM's and the Joint's assistance. HICEM was dissolved in 1945; HIAS continued its work in Europe under its own name.

=== Jewish displaced persons ===
In the wake of World War II, HIAS assumed its most massive job to date – assisting with the emigration needs of the approximately 300,000 Jewish displaced persons throughout the former war zone. Nearly every surviving Jewish family in Central and Eastern Europe had been separated, with parents and children scattered throughout many countries. Reuniting them so they could emigrate as a unit was one of the primary tasks for HIAS workers in the field. Obtaining documents required for emigration was difficult as throughout the war people had fled from one place to another, escaped from concentration camps to hide in villages and forests, then reappeared under assumed names. Identity papers were destroyed; false papers, fabricated papers, or, most often, no papers at all, were common. HIAS operations set up for DP work in Germany and Austria at the end of 1945 were the largest in the history of the organization in any one country, and they kept growing with the flood of refugees streaming out of Poland and Romania.

HIAS offices functioned in Hoechst, Frankfurt, Munich, Foehrenwald, Stuttgart, Berlin, Bremen, Hanover, Regensburg, Baden-Baden, Vienna, Linz, and Salzburg, with HIAS representatives stationed in the camps themselves. Besides Germany, HIAS worked in France, Italy, and Eastern European countries such as Poland, Hungary, Czechoslovakia, Romania, and Bulgaria. HIAS functioned in Shanghai until 1950, helping refugees who had escaped eastward from Nazi-occupied Europe to immigrate to Australia, the Americas, and Europe.

From 1945 to 1951, HIAS sponsored and assisted a total 167,450 emigrants: 79,675 of these immigrated to the U.S.; 24,049 to the British Commonwealth; 24,806 to Latin America; and 38,920 to Israel and other countries.

=== Evacuation of Jews from Muslim countries and Hungary, Cuba, Czechoslovakia, Poland, and Ethiopia ===
Since 1950, HIAS' activities have closely mirrored world events. In 1956, HIAS helped relocate Jews fleeing the Soviet invasion of Hungary, and evacuated the Jewish community of Egypt after their expulsion during the Sinai Campaign. During the Cuban Revolution, HIAS set up operations in Miami to relocate the Jews of Cuba.

During the 1960s, HIAS oversaw the migration of Jews from Algeria, Tunisia, and Libya and, through Operation Yachin (1961–1964), arranged with Morocco's King Hassan for the transfer of his country's huge Jewish community to France and, eventually, Israel. Of almost one million Jewish refugees from Muslim countries, about 80,000 were resettled by HIAS.

In 1965, HIAS was instrumental in the passage of an immigration law that finally replaced the National Origins Quota, eliminating decades of ethnic admission policies for the US. In 1968, HIAS came to the aid of Czechoslovakia's Jews after the suppression of the "Prague Spring", and to Poland's Jews after Communist Party factions started an internal fight using an anti-intellectual and anti-Semitic campaign, whose real goal was to weaken the pro-reform liberal party faction and attack other circles (1968 Polish political crisis).

In 1975, following the fall of Saigon, HIAS was asked by the State Department to aid in resettling Vietnamese refugees.

Since that time, the organization has continued to provide support for refugees of all nationalities, religions, and ethnic origins. This has been stated as: "Originally HIAS helped Jewish refugees; now HIAS is Jews helping all refugees."

In 1977, HIAS helped evacuate the Jews of Ethiopia, which culminated in several airlifts to Israel. However, in 1981, the Jewish Defense League protested the "lack of action" to rescue Ethiopian Jews by taking over the main offices of HIAS in Manhattan.

In close coordination with Israel, HIAS played a central role in rescuing Jews from Syria and Lebanon. In 1979, the overthrow of the Shah in Iran precipitated a slow but steady stream of Jews escaping the theocracy of that country, home to one of the world's oldest Jewish communities. Future New York State Senator 13- year-old Anna Kaplan was one of the Jewish Iranians whose escape and resettlement HIAS aided; her parents were unable to join her until over two years later. In addition, to helping Iranian Jews, many Iranians for religious e.g. Baháʼí faith or political reasons were also aided by HIAS.

=== The Soviet Jewry exodus ===
Beginning in the mid-1960s, HIAS returned to the work initiated at its founding – assisting immigrants escaping Russia with their arrival and resettlement needs in the U.S. Close to a century later, a new Jewish exodus from the previous Russian Empire – now the USSR – started with a trickle of departures.

On December 3, 1966, Premier Alexei Kosygin said in Paris that "if there are some families divided by the war who want to meet their relatives outside of the USSR, or even to leave the USSR, we shall do all in our power to help them, and there is no problem." In stark contrast to the premier's words, the Soviet authorities did everything in their power to prevent Jews from leaving the country, implementing anti-Semitic, anti-emigration campaigns that included harassment, economic pressure, and an increasingly bureaucratic visa-application process. These methods deterred many would-be applicants, who abandoned the process once their initial applications were denied.

During the early years of exodus, the number of departures depended largely on the status of the United States-Soviet relationship and on financial pragmatism. In hopes of achieving economic benefits from the US, the Soviet government sporadically opened its emigration gates, sometimes even in contradiction of its own legislation. Thus, despite the "Diploma Tax" that was instituted in December 1972 and required exiting Jews to pay for the higher education they received in the USSR, the government allowed two groups of 900 persons each to leave shortly thereafter without paying. By March 1973, the tax was revoked in the face of extreme pressure from the international public community and the Soviets' fear of not being awarded Most Favored Nation status by the U.S. In December 1973, the Jackson–Vanik Amendment, which linked trade agreements with the USSR to freedom of its citizens to emigrate, was passed in the U.S. Congress by a landslide. This legislation was an indicator of the degree to which the Soviet Jewry struggle had won the moral support of the West and had spurred the American Jewish community into action. The Soviet authorities were now subject to criticism not only from scattered groups of dissidents and refuseniks, but from tens of thousands protesting in front of Soviet embassies and consulates around the globe. Over time, these combined factors impacted the numbers of the Jews leaving the Soviet Union.

HIAS was involved from the beginning of the Jewish exodus from the USSR. In December 1966, HIAS organized a campaign to help American Jews invite their Soviet relatives to join them in the U.S. The Soviet Union initially allowed limited exit visas to the U.S., though eventually, regardless of their final destination, Soviet Jews who received permission to emigrate were granted exit visas only to Israel.

Early on, Vienna became the first stop for all Jews exiting the USSR. There they were greeted by a representative of the Jewish Agency for Israel (JAFI) and by HIAS, and were asked to determine their final destination. Those who were going to Israel were assisted by JAFI; those headed for the U.S. or elsewhere were processed by HIAS. After a short stay in Vienna, those destined for the U.S. were transferred to Rome, where they were processed by the U.S. Immigration and Naturalization Service (INS). This route came to be known as the Vienna-Rome Pipeline.

In August 1972, HIAS obtained U.S. parole status for hundreds of Russian refugees waiting in Rome, cutting their transit time from six months to six weeks. Parole made immigration possible without delay for all members of a family unit reunifying with their relatives in the U.S., who were formally considered their "sponsors".

In an effort to alleviate the financial burden on communities accepting increased numbers of Russian refugees, HIAS negotiated with the U.S. State Department a one-time $300 per-capita grant for Russians who emigrated from Europe to the U.S. after January 1974. HIAS passed along the full amount to each resettlement agency.

In the late 1980s and early 1990s, the years of perestroika and glasnost, the political face of the Soviet Union changed, as well as the course of Jewish history. Jews were now free to assemble, to worship – and to leave the country. But as the number of emigrants swelled in Rome, significant backlogs developed and the time between arrival in Rome and the HIAS interview grew to three weeks. By the summer of 1989 overall processing time took 70–80 days. This situation was further aggravated by the denial of refugee status by the INS for an increasing number of Soviet Jewish applicants.

In Washington, then-Attorney General Richard Thornburgh announced a new policy of unilateral review of all previously denied cases, using "the most generous standards for that review." The effect was immediate: INS began its review of the denied caseload in October, resulting in the overturning of more than 95 percent of the previous denials. As a result, the percentage of denials dropped from 40 to 2, eliminating the backlog.

Parallel activity was taking place in Congress, as this issue was brought to members' attention by HIAS and the Council of Jewish Federations (the precursor to the United Jewish Communities). In November 1989, President George H. W. Bush signed into law the Morrison-Lautenberg Amendment, which established that a member of a category group "may establish a well-founded fear of persecution on account of race, religion, nationality, membership in a particular social group, or political opinion [...] by asserting a credible basis for concern about the possibility of such persecution." This amendment, which has been renewed a number of times, is still in force today and greatly facilitates processing for refugees from former Soviet Union countries and Iran.

In late September 1989, the State Department announced a major change in processing refugee admission for Soviet applicants. With a decreasingly hostile environment inside the USSR, the U.S. instituted a system that allowed Soviet Jews to apply and remain in country while waiting for notification of status. From autumn 1989, those seeking family reunification in the U.S. applied for immigration processing at the U.S. Consulate in Moscow.

Overall, during the 40 years of Soviet Jewish emigration, HIAS assisted more than 400,000 Soviet Jews to immigrate to the U.S.

Among the recipients of HIAS aid was Sergey Brin, who at the age of six immigrated to the United States from the Soviet Union with his family, and later became the co-founder of Google. In 2009 Brin donated $1 million to the organization; his mother served on HIAS' board of directors.

== HIAS today ==
HIAS makes reference to Jewish tradition, values, and texts that call on Jews to welcome the stranger.

Since the 1970s, HIAS has worked to assist refugees and displaced people of all religions, ethnicities, nationalities, and backgrounds. It has helped many such refugees to reunite with their families, and to resettle in the United States.

HIAS has offices across five continents. Depending on location, HIAS services can include legal support, economic assistance, mental health care, housing, food assistance, refugee resettlement, and humanitarian assistance. HIAS also advocates in the United States Congress on policies affecting refugees and immigrants.

In the United States, HIAS helps resettle refugees from around the world through a national affiliate network of Jewish agencies. HIAS also advocates for immigration laws with a network of Jewish, interfaith, and other partners in Washington, DC, and nationwide. Additionally, HIAS promotes educational initiatives that encourage Jewish communities to engage in refugee aid and services.

In 2016 HIAS opened an office on the Greek island of Lesvos to provide legal services for refugees arriving by sea, predominantly from Syria.

In Israel, HIAS provides scholarships for those who have recently immigrated to Israel and assists Sudanese, Eritrean, and Ukrainian asylum seekers.

In Chad, HIAS provides mental health care, economic assistance, and protection services in refugee camps for Sudanese and other refugees. In Kenya, HIAS' helps refugees with trauma counseling and protection services, focusing on the needs of refugees in the Nairobi area.

In Latin America, HIAS provides legal services, economic assistance, mental health care, and humanitarian assistance for refugees, displaced people, immigrants, and host communities.

In 2018, the Tree of Life synagogue in Pittsburgh was targeted by a mass shooter for hosting a HIAS National Refugee Shabbat event. The shooter referenced HIAS in a social media rant on the platform Gab immediately before the shooting, and the event has taken place the weekend earlier.

In 2019, HIAS founded a new European branch, HIAS Europe, to oversee humanitarian programming funded by the European Union and to respond to crises in the region. In 2022, HIAS responded to the war in Ukraine by expanding operations in Eastern Europe to provide emergency aid to displaced people, and supported Jewish communities in resettling Ukrainian refugees in the United States and across Europe.

== HIAS archives ==
Some records of HIAS from 1900 to 1970 (415 linear feet [126 m] and 851 reels of microfilm) are currently held by YIVO Institute for Jewish Research and are available for research. Other records (more than 1,800 linear feet) are held by the American Jewish Historical Society (AJHS) and are currently being processed. The bulk of these records span from the late 1940s to the 1990s but some records (such as the meeting minutes of the board of directors) go back as far as 1912. These records will be available for research in late 2018.
