= SS Nieuw Amsterdam (1905) =

Dutch ocean liner

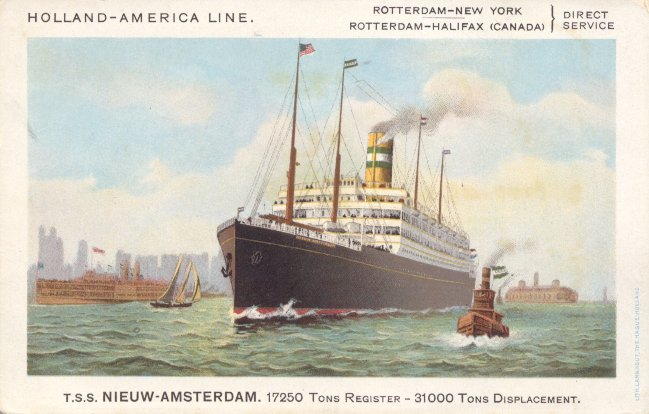
- Official postcard of Nieuw Amsterdam

History

Netherlands
- Name: Nieuw Amsterdam
- Namesake: New Amsterdam
- Owner: NASM
- Operator: Holland America Line
- Port of registry: Rotterdam
- Route: Rotterdam – Hoboken
- Builder: Harland & Wolff, Belfast
- Yard number: 366
- Laid down: 21 January 1904
- Launched: 28 September 1905
- Completed: 22 February 1906
- Maiden voyage: 7 April 1906
- Refit: 1925, 1930
- Identification: code letters PMSV; by 1913: call sign MHB; 1914: call sign PEB
- Fate: Scrapped 1932

General characteristics
- Type: ocean liner
- Tonnage: 16,967 GRT, 10,174 NRT, 17,363 DWT
- Displacement: 31,000 tons
- Length: 615 ft (187 m) overall; 600.3 ft (183.0 m) registered
- Beam: 68.9 ft (21.0 m)
- Draught: 34 ft 1 1/2 in (10.40 m)
- Depth: 35.6 ft (10.9 m)
- Decks: 3
- Installed power: 2 × quadruple expansion engines; 1,767 NHP, 11,000 ihp
- Propulsion: 2 × screws
- Speed: 16 knots (30 km/h)
- Capacity: passengers: 1906: 440 1st class, 246 2nd class, 2,200 steerage; 1925: cabin class & tourist class only; 1930: 442 1st class, 202 2nd class, 636 3rd class and 1,284 4th class; cargo: 631,000 cubic feet (17,868 m^{3}) grain, 578,000 cubic feet (16,367 m^{3}) bale
- Sensors & processing systems: by 1910: submarine signalling; by 1930: wireless direction finding

SS Nieuw Amsterdam was a steam ocean liner that was launched in Ireland in 1905, completed in 1906 and scrapped in Japan in 1932. Holland America Line (Nederlandsch-Amerikaansche Stoomvaart Maatschappij or NASM) owned and operated her throughout her career.

She was the first of four NASM ships to have been named after the former Dutch colony of New Amsterdam. She was the largest and swiftest ship in the company's fleet until Rotterdam entered service in 1908.

The ship's usual route was between Rotterdam and Hoboken. She remained in service through most of the First World War, despite numerous disruptions by the Allied and German navies. In 1918 she repatriated Dutch seafarers whose ships had been seized by the US government, and in 1919 she repatriated members of the American Expeditionary Forces from France. In 1922 a cargo fire damaged the ship, and she was under repair for the next six months.

In July 1931 the North Atlantic Shipping Conference responded to a slump in trade by agreeing to reduce the number of passenger liners running between Europe and North America. Nieuw Amsterdam was one of a number of older ships that were identified as surplus. In January 1932 she was sold to be broken up.

== Building ==
Harland & Wolff laid down the ship in Belfast as yard number 366 on slipway number 1 on 21 January 1904. She was launched on 28 September 1905 and completed on 6 March 1906. Her lengths were 615 ft (187 m) overall and 600.3 ft (183.0 m) registered. Her beam was 68.9 ft (21.0 m) and her depth was 35.6 ft (10.9 m). Her tonnages were 16,967 GRT, 10,174 NRT and 17,363 DWT.

She had berths for 440 first class, 246 second class and 2,200 steerage passengers. Her passenger accommodation included a Dutch smoking room, decorated with views of New Amsterdam; a Japanese-style tea room; and an Empire style social hall. Her holds had capacity for 631,000 cubic feet (17,868 m^{3}) of grain, or 578,000 cubic feet (16,367 m^{3}) of baled cargo.

Nieuw Amsterdam was the first NASM ship to have quadruple expansion steam engines. She had twin engines driving twin screws. The combined power output of her two engines was rated at 1,767 NHP or 11,000 ihp. They gave her a speed of 16 knots (30 km/h). She was a coal-burner. Her bunkers held 3,000 tons of coal, and at sea she burnt 100 tons a day. She had four masts, and was the last NASM ship to be equipped with auxiliary sails. She never used them.

NASM registered the ship at Rotterdam. Her code letters were PMSV. The Marconi Company equipped her for wireless telegraphy.

== Early years ==
Nieuw Amsterdam joined NASM's Potsdam, Rijndam, Noordam on the route between Rotterdam and Hoboken via Boulogne. She began her maiden voyage on 7 April 1906, and reached Hoboken on 16 April.

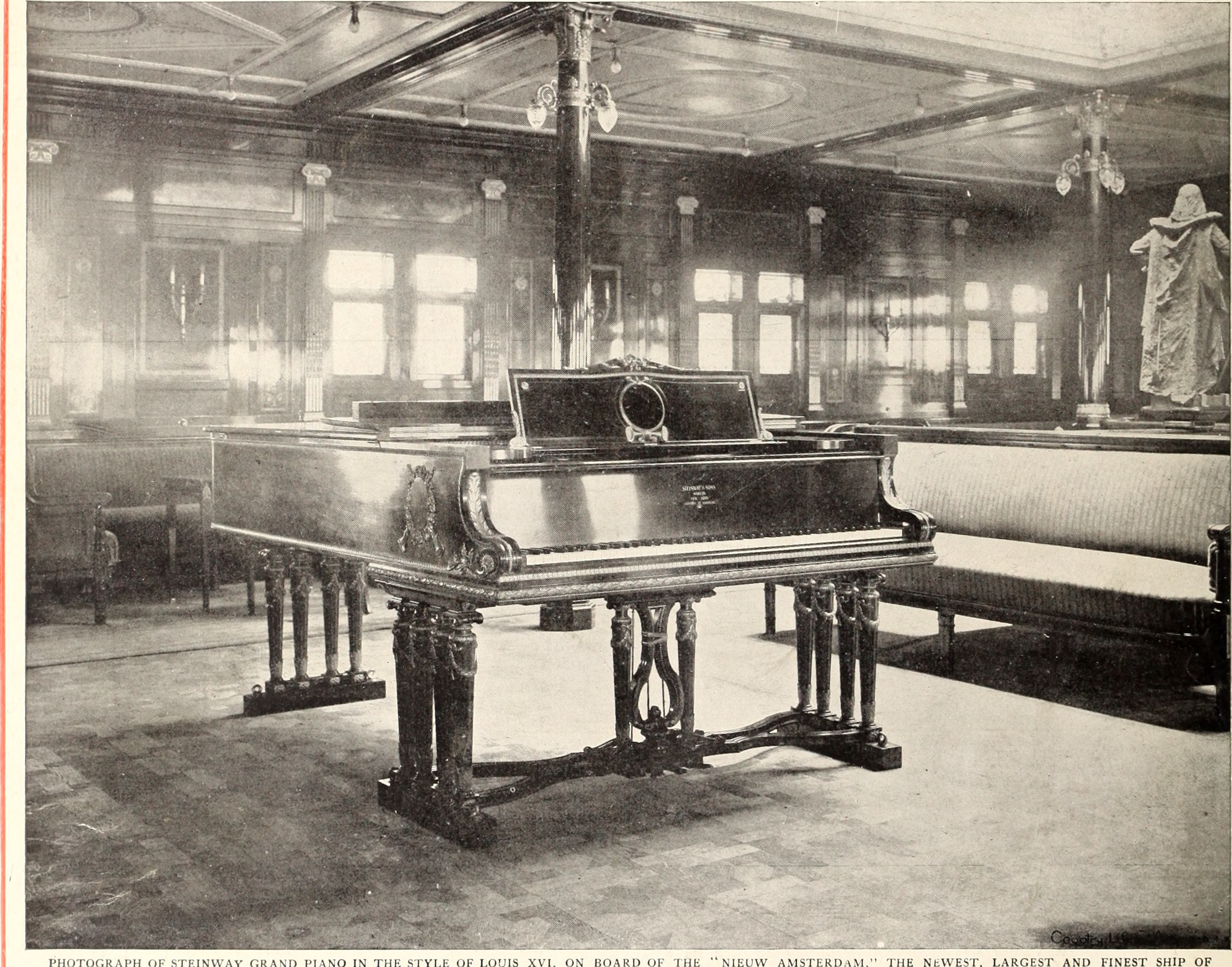
Steinway & Sons grand piano in Nieuw Amsterdam's music room

On 24 August 1906, while steaming up the Nieuwe Waterweg to Rotterdam, Nieuw Amsterdam grounded near Maassluis. Her passengers were transferred to smaller vessels, and part of her cargo was discharged to lighters.She was refloated the next day.

Nieuw Amsterdam's boat deck was glazed-in in 1908. She represented the Netherlands at the Hudson–Fulton Celebration in September and October 1909. Her bridge deck was extended in 1910. By the middle of 1910 she was equipped for submarine signalling.

On 28 March 1910, Nieuw Amsterdam arrived at Ellis Island carrying passengers including 600 Dutch emigrants who intended to farm in the Dakotas, Iowa and Minnesota. However, one passenger was found to have smallpox, so 150 of them were quarantined at the isolation hospital on Hoffman Island. On 31 October 1910, the ship arrived at Hoboken carrying passengers including the soprano Lydia Lipkowska and singers of the Boston Opera Company.

On 15 April 1912 White Star Line's RMS Titanic sank with the loss of 1,517 lives. Under public scrutiny after the disaster, other companies admitted that their passenger ships carried too few lifeboats. Holland America Line was one of them, and the company duly had five more lifeboats installed aboard Nieuw Amsterdam, positioned on her poop deck. By 1913 her wireless telegraph call sign was MHB, but by 1914 it had been changed to PEB.

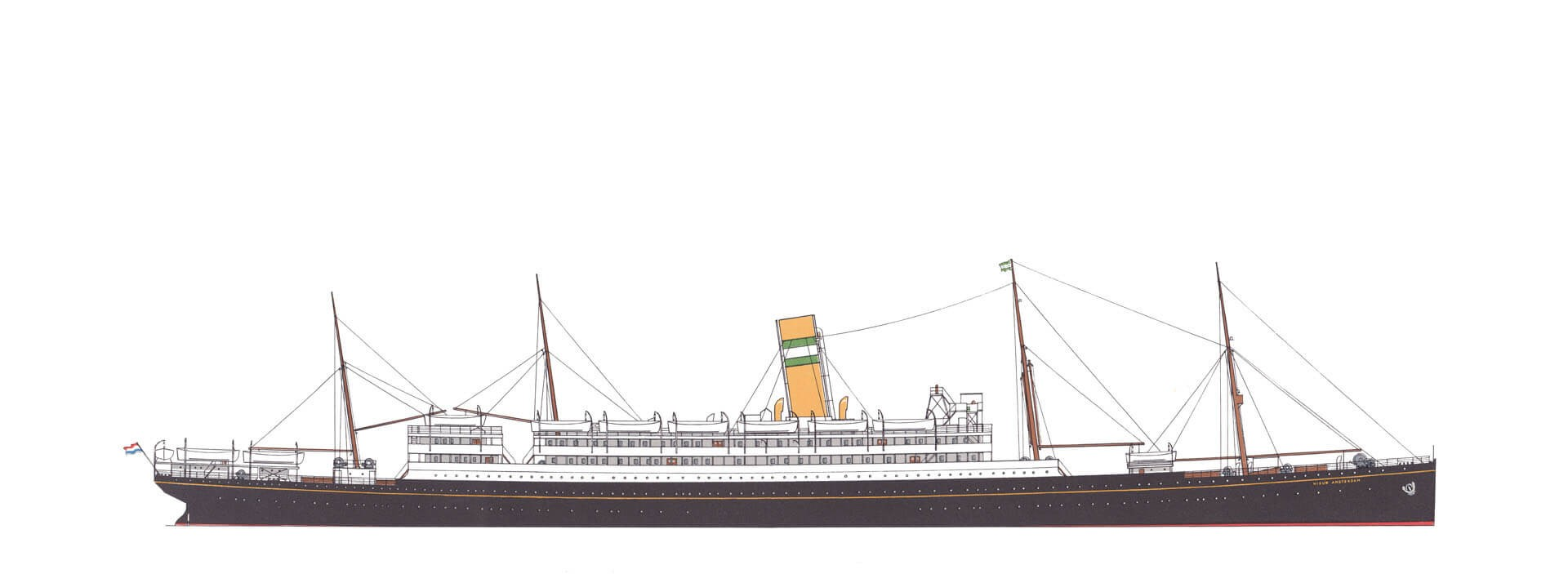
Waterline representation of Nieuw Amsterdam after five lifeboats were added to her poop in 1912

On a westbound crossing in November 1913, a passenger in second class, Mrs Bakker, was taken ill. She was admitted to the ship's hospital, but died two days after leaving Rotterdam. The Second Class chief stewardess took care of Mrs Bakker's three children, who were aged five, seven, and nine. Nieuw Amsterdam's Master, Captain Baron, intended for Mrs Bakker's body to be buried at sea. Passengers raised a fund of $200 for the family, and asked Captain Baron to have her body embalmed for burial ashore instead. Despite having a wireless telegraph, Nieuw Amsterdam did not tell Mr Bakker of his wife's death. On 1 December he arrived at Hoboken to meet his family, and was told of his wife's death as he was meeting his eldest daughter. He thanked passengers for their generosity, and said he would have his wife's body buried in their home town of Ionia, Michigan.

On a westbound crossing in February 1914, Nieuw Amsterdam weathered continuous storms all the way from the English Channel to New York Bay. On 12 February, waves swept away two of her lifeboats, damaged three others, and bent one of her steel bulkheads. On that day she made only 73 nautical miles (135 km) in 24 hours. At times her engines were reduced to dead slow; just enough to maintain steerage into the storm. Three crew members and two passengers were injured in the voyage. One passenger suffered a broken leg and several fractured ribs. On 13 February she altered course to avoid a waterspout, which passed within 2 nautical miles (4 km) of the ship. On 15 February she sighted an iceberg at 42°10′N 54°54′W. The ship reached Hoboken on 19 February, three days late. Despite the storms, she had averaged 12 knots (22 km/h) during the voyage.

== First World War ==
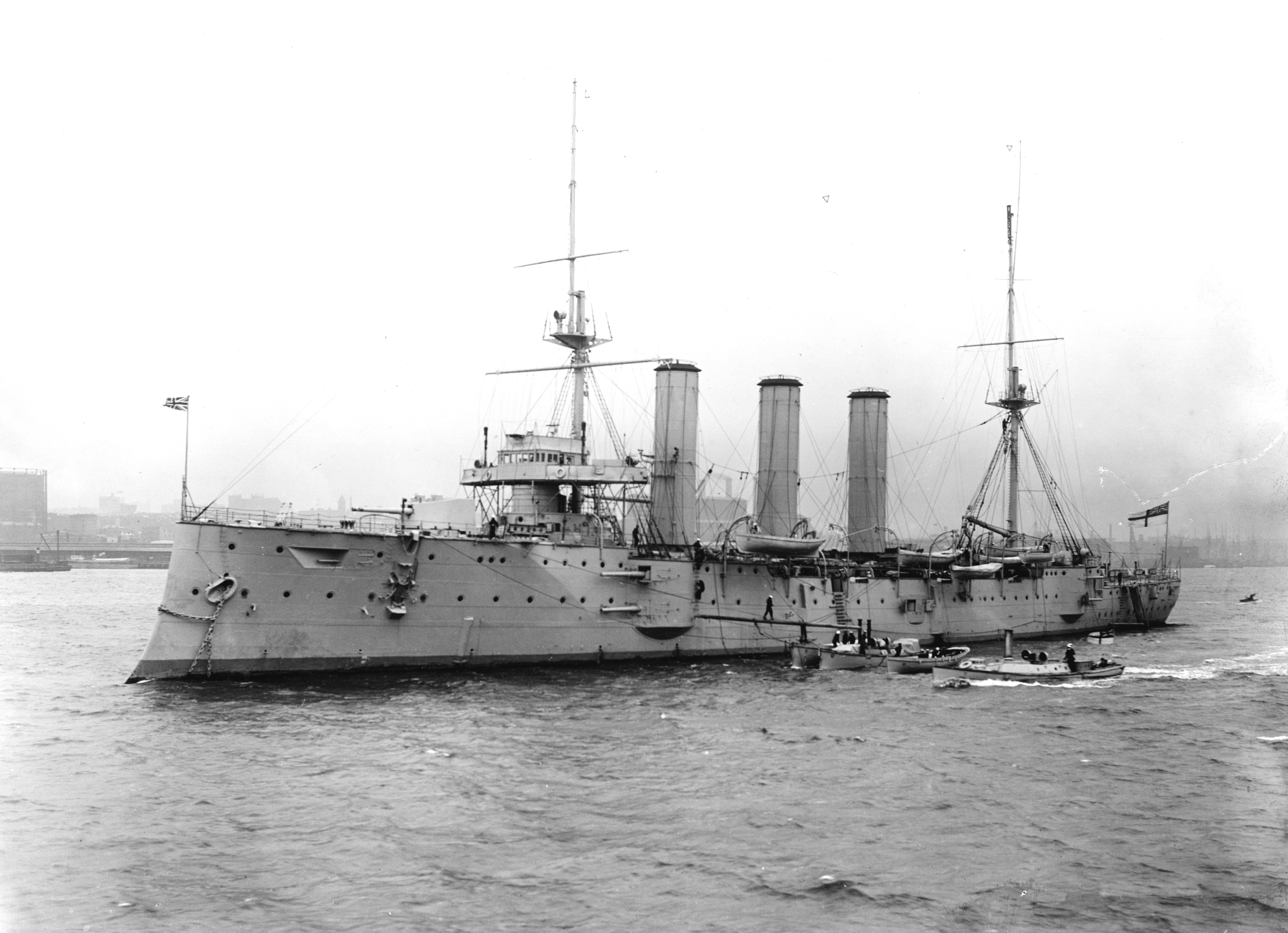
HMS Essex, which stopped Nieuw Amsterdam in August 1914

The First World War began on 28 July 1914. Because many people wanted to leave Europe, NASM created emergency berths for 50 people in Nieuw Amsterdam's baggage room. On 8 August she left Rotterdam carrying a record number of passengers. Early in her voyage, a Royal Navy torpedo boat stopped and inspected her near the North Hinder Light. Off Plymouth the next day, another Royal Navy torpedo boat stopped and inspected her again. On the evening of 16 August the cruiser HMS Essex stopped her 370 nautical miles (690 km) east of the Ambrose Channel Lightship, which asked if the Dutch liner had seen any German cruisers. By the time she reached Hoboken on 17 August, Nieuw Amsterdam was carrying 1,934 passengers: 647 in first class, 494 in second, and 793 in third.

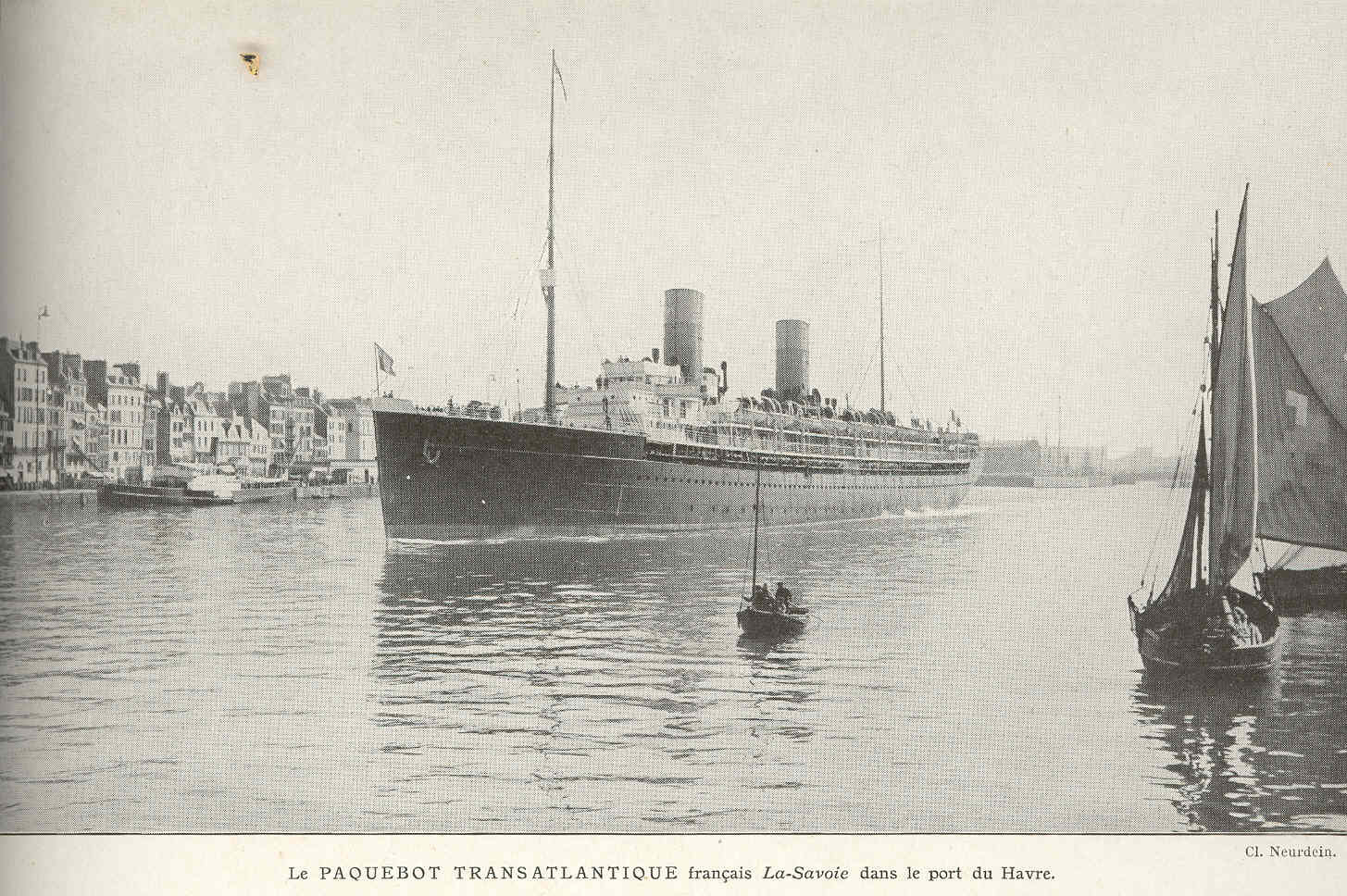
The armed merchant cruiser La Savoie, which stopped Nieuw Amsterdam in September 1914

As Nieuw Amsterdam returned from Hoboken on her way to Rotterdam, the French armed merchant cruiser (AMC) de:La Savoie stopped and inspected her. 400 German and 250 Austrians, reported to be military reservists returning home, were found aboard. La Savoie interned them and took them to Crozon in Brittany.

On 21 September, Nieuw Amsterdam arrived at Hoboken with 1,793 passengers, most of whom were German Americans. The Entente Powers often inspected neutral ships, to try to ensure they were not violating their blockade of the Central Powers. On 29 September she left Hoboken for Rotterdam. On 8 October, UK authorities held her at Plymouth.

=== 1915 ===
On 18 January 1915, the armed merchant cruiser HMS Caronia stopped and inspected Nieuw Amsterdam off Sandy Hook. US citizens were required to show their passports.

In the North Sea on 29 May 1915, Nieuw Amsterdam passed within 600 yards (550 m) of three British trawlers as three German biplanes tried to attack them. The next day, a Royal Navy AMC stopped Nieuw Amsterdam and ordered her to anchor at The Downs. Six German and Austrian passengers were arrested. One was later released, but the other five were taken to an internment camp near Margate. The ship was detained at The Downs for four and a half days. British authorities did not allow passengers ashore, but local fishing smacks delivered newspapers and telegrams to the ship each day. On 30 June 1915 Nieuw Amsterdam was again anchored at The Downs, when another steamship collided with her. It was the eighth collision at The Downs in three days.

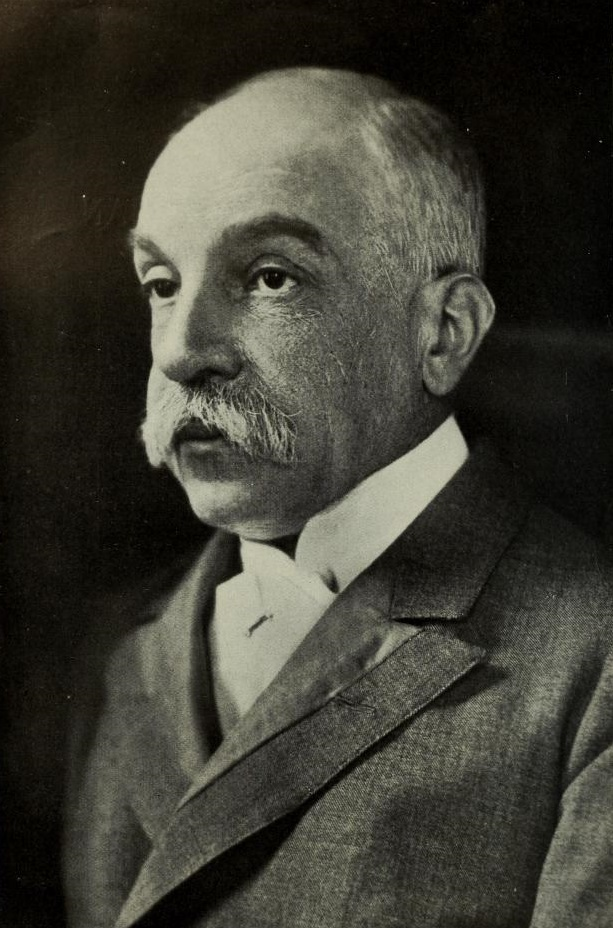
Konstantin Dumba

In September 1915 the US Government accused the Austro-Hungarian Ambassador to Washington, Konstantin Dumba, of trying to organise the sabotage of US munitions production. Austria-Hungary recalled Dumba, and on 5 October he left Hoboken for Rotterdam aboard Nieuw Amsterdam.

On 14 December 1915 Nieuw Amsterdam left Hoboken for Rotterdam. The Royal Navy detained her at The Downs and seized all her mail. As she left The Downs, the liner grounded at Forkspit, off Deal. She was refloated at noon, and continued to Rotterdam.

On 31 December 1915 Nieuw Amsterdam left Rotterdam for Hoboken. A Royal Navy cruiser intercepted her the next day, and she was held at The Downs for 24 hours. She was then held at Falmouth for five days, where her mail was censored, and 150 bags of mail from Germany were seized. She reached Hoboken with 550 passengers on 15 January 1916.

=== 1916 ===
Dutch artist Piet van der Hem's editorial cartoon decrying the sinking of Tubantia

On 16 March 1916 a German U-boat sank the Dutch liner Tubantia by torpedo in the North Sea. NASM introduced extra safety measures. Nieuw Amsterdam was equipped with 38 life rafts to supplement her lifeboats. Two seagoing tugs would follow her across the North Sea, and the Dutch government stationed another tug off the North Hinder Lightship, 47 nautical miles (87 km) off the mouth of the Maas. A sailing of Nieuw Amsterdam from Rotterdam that had been scheduled for 29 April was postponed until 8 May.

Early in August 1916, UK authorities again seized Nieuw Amsterdam's mail when she was headed for Rotterdam. By October 1916, her route between Rotterdam and Falmouth was via Orkney and the north coast of Scotland instead of the English Channel. At first the UK authorities required neutral ships on this route to call at Kirkwall for inspection. From the end of October this requirement was suspended, because of the dangers of northern Scotland's rocky coast in winter. The ships would still be inspected at Falmouth.

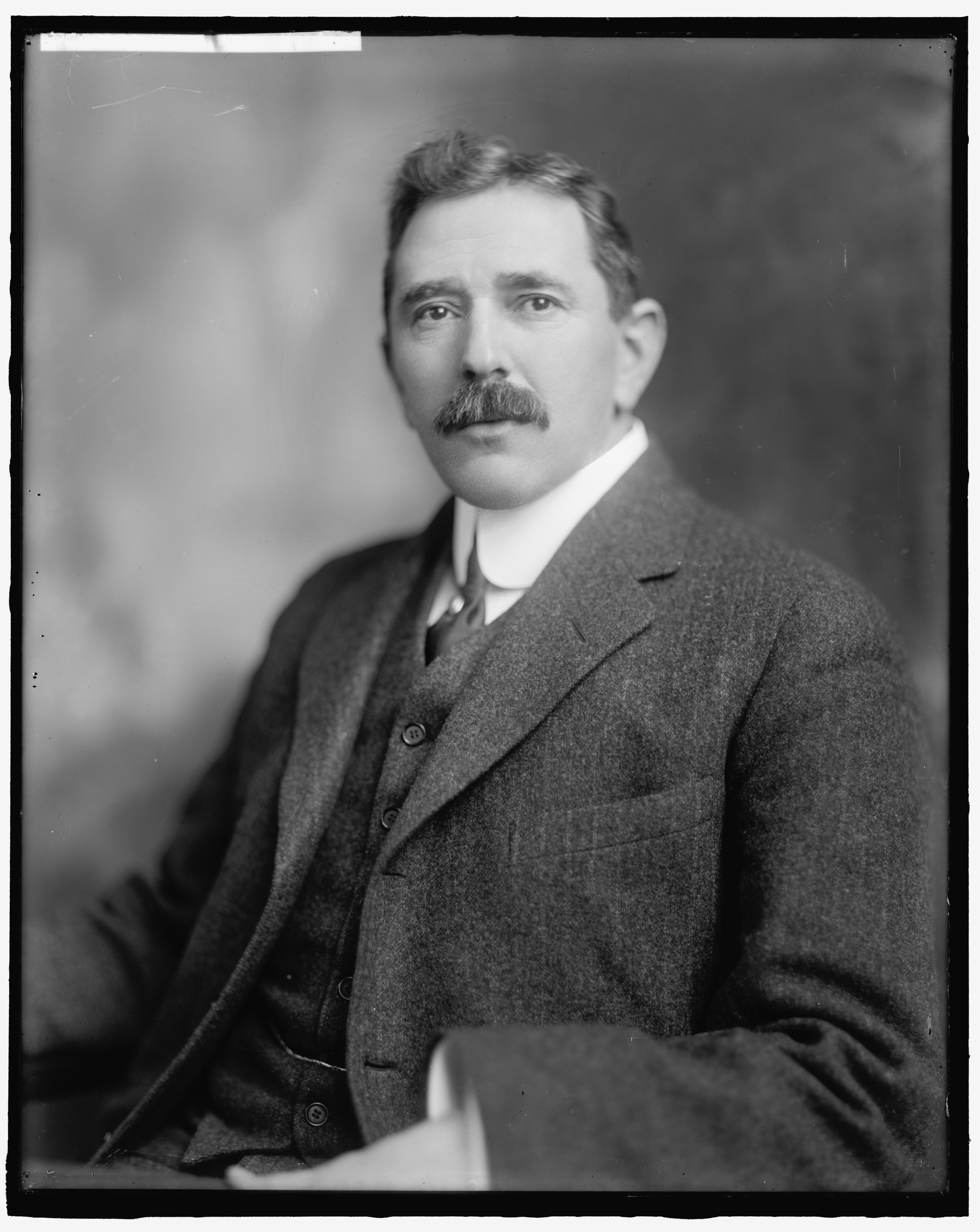
Herman A. Metz of Farbwerke Hoechst

On 17 November 1916 Nieuw Amsterdam reached Hoboken carrying cargo including dyes worth $1 million for Herman A. Metz, President of Farbwerke Hoechst. It was alleged that the dyes were for printing US banknotes. The UK government had ceased granting permits for German dyes to be exported for this purpose.

On 21 December 1916, the naval trawler HMT St. Ives was sent to sweep for mines to let Nieuw Amsterdam enter Falmouth. Off St Anthony Head the trawler hit a mine laid by a German U-boat, which sank her, killing 11 of her crew. In Falmouth, UK authorities removed one Hungarian passenger from Nieuw Amsterdam. The ship reached Hoboken on 2 January 1917. Among her passengers were 214 Belgian refugees, all with relatives in the USA. They included 84 children, some of whom travelled unaccompanied. The Belgians were held at Ellis Island, and reached New York on 4 January.

=== 1917 ===
In February 1917 Germany resumed unrestricted submarine warfare. Nieuw Amsterdam was recalled to port by wireless, and arrived off Hook of Holland on 3 February. She was laid up in Rotterdam until 30 June, when she left for Hoboken carrying passengers but no cargo or mail.

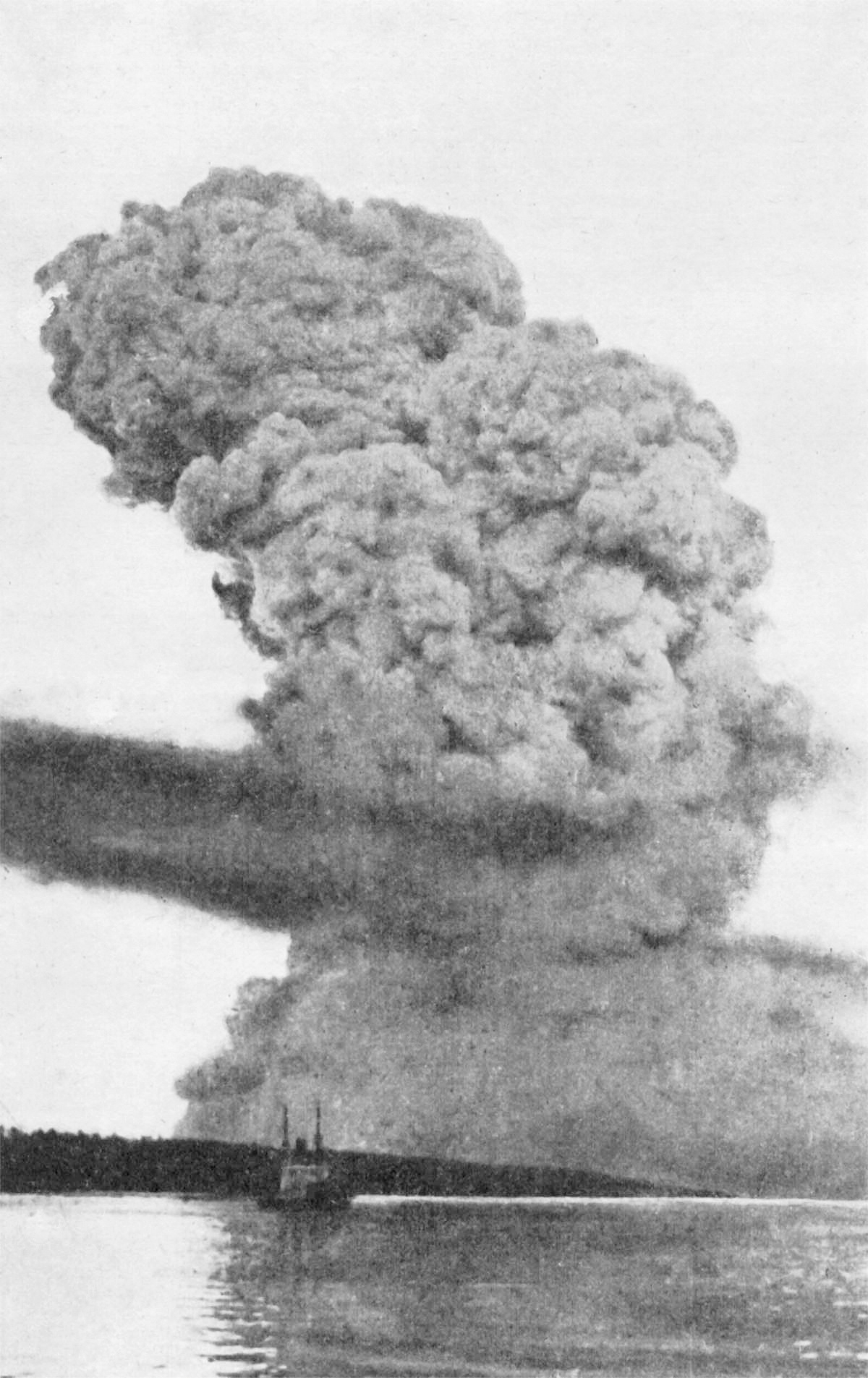
Cloud rising from the Halifax Explosion in December 1917

On 6 April 1917 the USA declared war against the Central Powers. From about August 1917, the USA started detaining Dutch ships in US ports. By the beginning of October, Nieuw Amsterdam was in "an Atlantic port" of the US, loaded with 10,000 tons of corn for the Commission for Relief in Belgium. However, the US Exports Administrative Board would not let her leave port, because the USA was considering using neutral ships for US war service. By early November, she had embarked 300 Dutch refugees, who wished to return to the Netherlands, but the War Trade Board still would not release her. She was finally allowed to leave New York on 24 November, but then the UK authorities detained her at Halifax, Nova Scotia. She was there during the Halifax Explosion on 6 December. A week later the UK authorities would not release her, because Germany would not guarantee her safe passage. However, by 15 December NASM hoped that she would soon be allowed to continue.

=== Early 1918 ===
By 16 January 1918 Nieuw Amsterdam was at Rotterdam, and had loaded cargo including Dutch flower bulbs and plants, and had embarked 2,000 passengers. However, she did not leave for Hoboken, as the German government failed to guarantee her safe passage. On 23 January the Daily Mail claimed that some of her passengers had received anonymous warnings not to sail on her, like those that some of RMS Lusitania's passengers were reported to have received before she was sunk in May 1915. Some passengers disembarked. On 24 January, Algemeen Handelsblad reported that Germany intended to blacklist all Dutch shipping companies due to their agreement with the US government. On 25 January Nieuw Amsterdam left the Maas for Hoboken.

UK authorities let Nieuw Amsterdam pass the Canadian coast without having to call at Halifax. On 6 February she reached "an Atlantic port" in the USA carrying 1,506 passengers. When she docked at Hoboken, 100 soldiers and US Marines guarded the pier. US authorities at first allowed no passengers to disambark, except for two Dutch diplomats. United States Customs Service officers, and women of the Naval Auxiliary, questioned passengers and inspected their papers. Officers seized and examined all liquids and powders from passengers' baggage, including tooth powder, face powder, and medicines. This was said to be for fear of a German plot to introduce a fungus or other biohazard to poison grain crops in the USA.

A total of 40 passengers from first and second class were detained on Ellis Island. One was found in possession of 12 sheets of ciphers, and confessed to be a German agent, sent to distribute a new cipher to German agents in the USA. The ship's second steward, Reint Soberings, was a German national. He was found in possession of German naval intelligence signals, disguised as a hand-written letter, and was arrested as a spy. The ship's assistant purser, Johannes Werkhoven, was found to be carrying financial coupons worth $7,000 hidden in a cigar box, in violation of the Trading with the Enemy Act of 1917. He was alleged to have trafficked coupons worth about $3 million since the previous January.

Eight truckloads of written and printed material, and phonograph records, were taken from the ship for censors and intelligence officers to examine. After all the passengers had been examined, the ship's cargo would be inspected before being unloaded.

=== Dutch ships seized ===
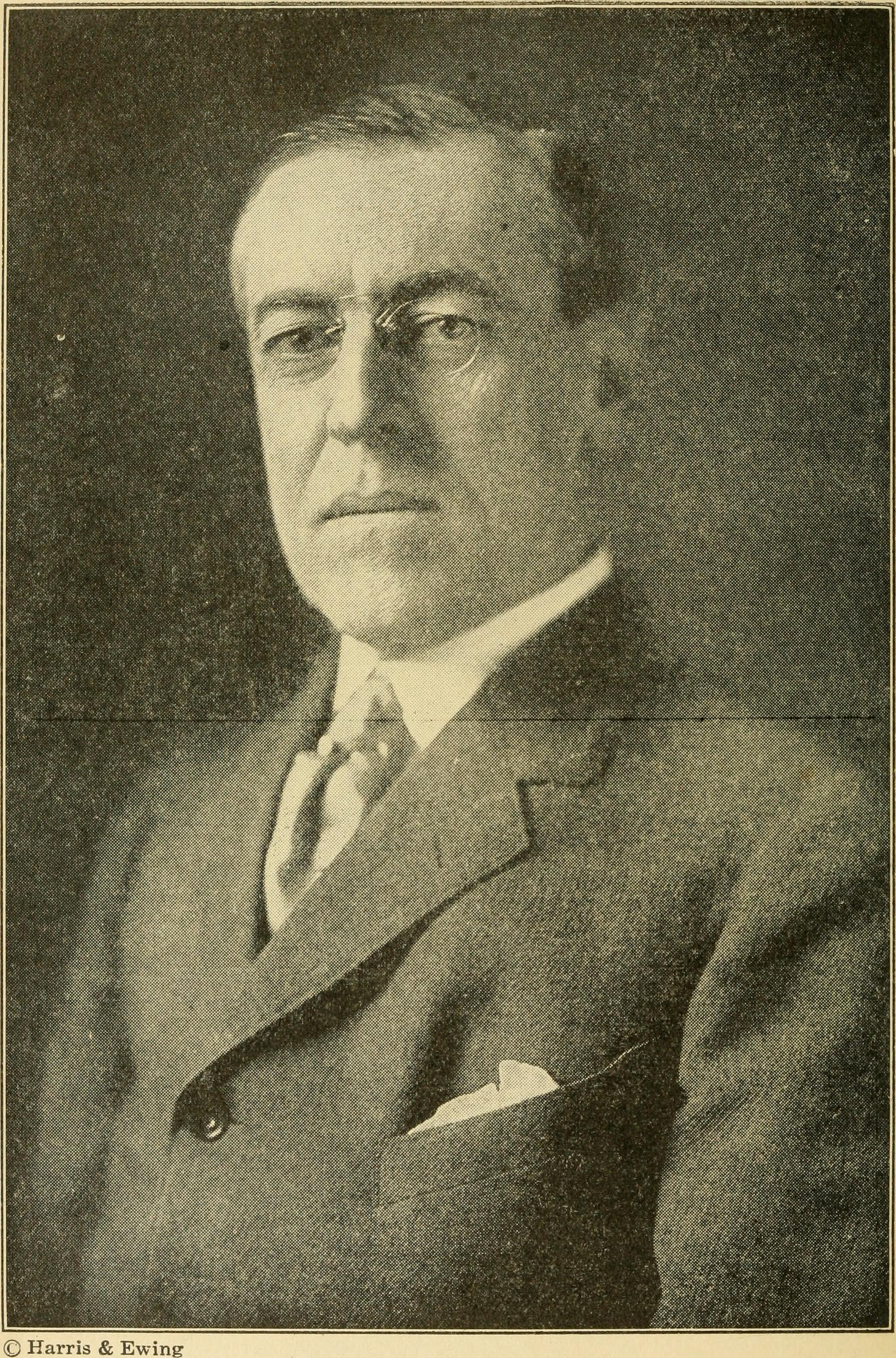
Woodrow Wilson in 1918

On 20 March 1918, President Woodrow Wilson ordered the seizure under angary of 89 Dutch ships in US ports, but exempted Nieuw Amsterdam. US Navy personnel were to crew the ships, and Nieuw Amsterdam was to repatriate the Dutch crews. Nieuw Amsterdam embarked about Dutch 700 officers and about 1,000 Dutch seamen. She had already loaded a cargo of food for the Netherlands, including 8,000 tons of rice and 2,000 tons of coffee. On 28 March she left Hoboken carrying a total of 2,000 passengers. She arrived off Hook of Holland on 10 April.

In May 1918 Nieuw Amsterdam was delayed in Rotterdam for several days, awaiting a German government guarantee of her safe passage. This was granted on condition that she carried no US passengers. She sailed on 30 May. She was allowed to pass Halifax without being stopped, and on 12 June arrived in the North River carrying 612 passengers. US and UK naval intelligence officers, 100 US Customs Service officers, and 50 United States Secret Service and Bureau of Immigration officers came aboard to examine passengers and search the ship. Two passengers from second class were sent to Ellis Island, and three stowaways were found, but no arrests were made. The US government had taken over NASM's piers at Hoboken, so on 13 June Nieuw Amsterdam docked at West 57th Street Pier in Manhattan.

On her return voyage to Rotterdam, Nieuw Amsterdam arrived off Hook of Holland on 16 July 1918. That August, the Dutch government negotiated what food cargo the US government would allow Nieuw Amsterdam to take to the Netherlands. On 4 August De Telegraaf reported that the Dutch wanted her to bring a cargo of fats. However, on 20 August the US War Trade Board gave permission for her to carry 10,000 tons of grain, on condition that on her next trip she would carry cargo for the Commission for Relief in Belgium.

On a westbound crossing in October 1918, 50 of Nieuw Amsterdam's 900 passengers were taken ill with Spanish flu. By the time she reached New York Bay on 22 October, 32 cases in third class had recovered, but 12 cases in second class were still confined to their berths. Four had high temperatures and were hospitalised ashore. She was quarantined outside New York for 24 hours, examined and fumigated, and then allowed to dock. Her cargo included 4,000 tons of German goods including toys, dolls, and ceramics. NASM asserted that this was at the repeated request of the US government.

== Post-war years ==
After the Armistice of 11 November 1918, Nieuw Amsterdam made NASM's first post-war crossing to New York, leaving Rotterdam on 21 December 1918. On 5 January 191 she reached West 57th Street Pier, bringing home 323 officers and 1,829 men of the American Expeditionary Forces. Late that February she called at Brest, France, where she embarked 2,200 officers and men of the 27th Infantry Division, including units of the 107th Infantry Regiment. She landed them at Pier 7, Hoboken, on 9 March. In April 1919 the ship again called at Brest to embark US troops. At Hoboken on 2 May she landed 53 officers and 1,645 men of the 77th Infantry Division, most of whom were members of the 302nd Engineer Regiment. Also aboard were 500 civilian passengers.

On 4 November 1919 Nieuw Amsterdam arrived in Hoboken carrying 165 barrels of aniline dyes from Germany. This was the first import of aniline dyes from Germany since April 1917. Longshoremen were on strike when she arrived. She joined NASM's Noordam, Rijndam and flagship Rotterdam, which were all strike-bound in Hoboken. On 29 June 1920 Nieuw Amsterdam arrived in Hoboken carrying passengers including a delegation from NDL led by Phillip Heineken. They had come to negotiate with Francis R Mayer of the United States Mail Steamship Company, which the United States Shipping Board had set up with former NDL and HAPAG liners. The US company wanted to use NDL's piers.

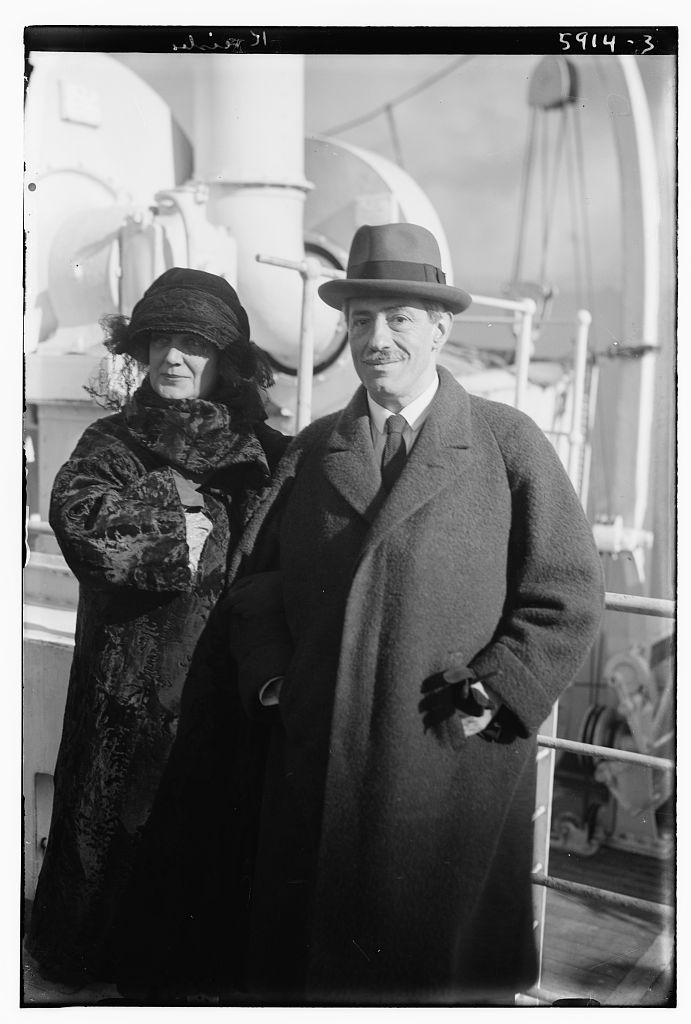
Fritz and Harriet Kreisler

On 12 October 1920 Nieuw Amsterdam arrived in New York Bay carrying 2,294 passengers, including 1,673 in steerage. One child in steerage was found to have smallpox, so the ship was quarantined. Passengers in first and second class were vaccinated, and then brought to Hoboken by steam barges. They included the violinist Fritz Kreisler and his wife, who had come to make a concert tour. Both Hoffman Island and Swinburne Island were crowded with passengers from Noordam and Roma, so Nieuw Amsterdam was detained in quarantine indefinitely, at NASM's expense.

On 29 December 1920 Nieuw Amsterdam left Hoboken for Rotterdam. As she passed about 300 yards (270 m) off The Battery, she accidentally rammed the steam lighter John C. Craven, cutting her in two. Both parts of the lighter capsized and sank. Two of the lightermen were killed, but four tugs rescued the skipper and five members of his crew.

On 19 February 1921 Dennis Dougherty, Archbishop of Philadelphia, travelled to Jersey City in a decorated special train to embark on Nieuw Amsterdam. 5,000 people lined the streets to see him as he passed from Jersey City to the ship. He was on his way to Rome to be made a Cardinal.

== Cargo fire ==
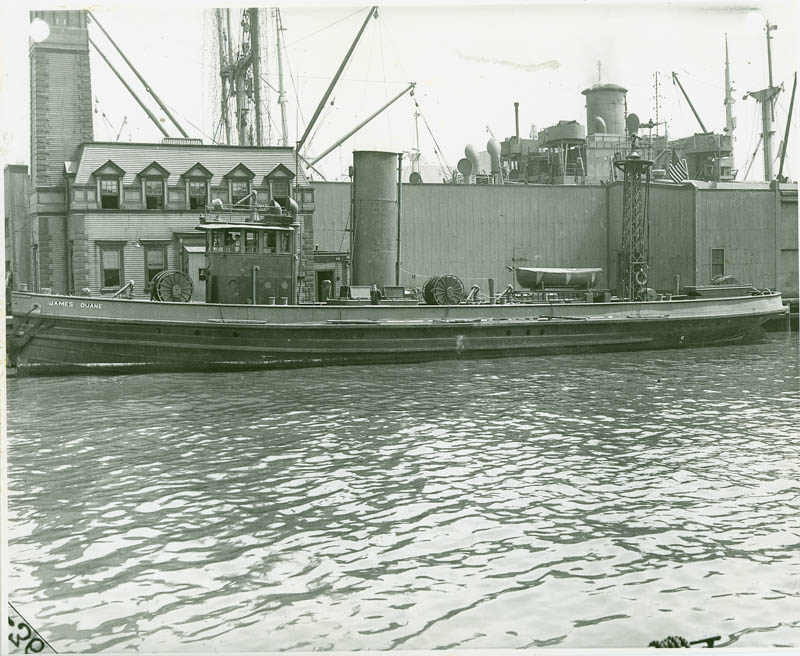
Fireboat James Duane

On 8 July 1922 Nieuw Amsterdam was due to leave Hoboken with 700 passengers. However, at 10:00 hrs that morning her Chief Officer, Rudolph van Erb, discovered a fire in her number 5 hold aft. Her crew fought the fire for an hour, and then her Master, Peter ven den Heuvel, called the Hoboken Fire Department. The burning cargo included acid, lard, and oil cakes. Van Erb and other members of the crew were overcome by fumes, and taken to a temporary hospital at the rear of the main deck. Captain van den Heuvel ordered passengers to disembark, but by then most passengers had already gone ashore.

By 13:00 hrs, 40 firemen were being treated for the effects of fumes, and Hoboken FD asked New York City Fire Department for a fireboat. James Duane came from West 35th Street and directed two water jets onto the fire. The Hoboken Fire Chief, Andrew Keller, was overcome by fumes, as were some of his men. A doctor from St Mary's Hospital, Hoboken, Julia Lichtenstein, treated Chief Keller and other casualties.

Two Merritt-Chapman floating derricks came alongside the ship. One carried a diver, who found the source of the fire, on which all hoses then concentrated. With thousands of gallons of water pumped into the number 5 hold to fight the fire, the ship was now down by the stern. The cargo in the lower part of her after hold was grain, and if the water reached it, the grain would expand and could bulge her hull.

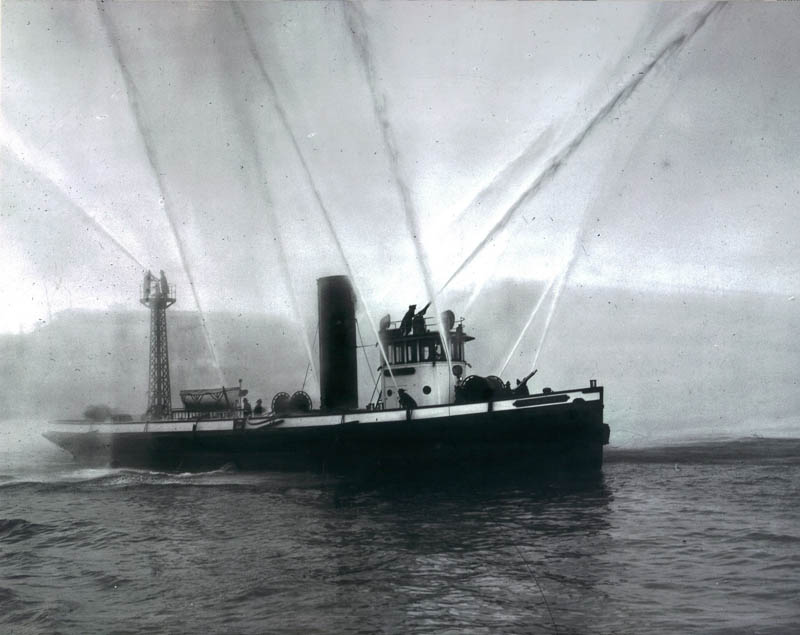
Fireboat Thomas Willett

New York FD Battalion Chief Fred Murray was also overcome by fumes. So were all but one of the crew of James Duane. The fireboat Thomas Willett was sent from Bloomfield Street. Thomas Willett's crew took over James Duane, and Thomas Willett evacuated James Duane's incapacitated crew. The fire was under control by 15:00 hrs and extinguished by 15:30.

Fire Chief Keller declared that the damage was confined to the cargo and had not affected the ship. However, Nieuw Amsterdam's sailing was postponed to 11 July for her to be surveyed. NASM offered passengers in first class the options of either re-boarding the ship to await her delayed departure at the company's expense or transferring to United States Lines' President Harding. Passengers in second class were allowed to re-board the ship. Passengers in third class were given rooms in hotels in Hoboken.

On 9 July, the water was pumped out of number 5 hold, and the grain was discharged into a lighter. NASM said the fire started on the orlop deck above the grain; possibly in sugar that was part of the cargo. Damage was estimated at, at least, $100,000.

== Final years ==
After arriving in Rotterdam in July 1922, Nieuw Amsterdam was dry docked. She spent the next six months being repaired and renovated. NASM took the opportunity to have some changes made, including adding a new ballroom. She returned to service in March 1923. On 18 March she reached Hoboken carrying 500 passengers, 400 of whom were Dutch and German farmers and their families, who intended to settle in western states.

On 30 October 1924, on a westbound crossing from Rotterdam to Hoboken, Nieuw Amsterdam grounded on a shingle bank southwest of The Needles in the English Channel. She was undamaged, her crew refloated her, and she continued her voyage. On 24 February 1926 she ran aground again, this time on Horse and Dean shoal off Spithead. She was refloated, and continued to Southampton, which by then was her English port of call.

In 1925 NASM had Nieuw Amsterdam refitted as a two-class ship, with cabin class and tourist class only. By January 1929 her route included calls at Halifax as well as Southampton and Boulogne. At Halifax she served Pier 21, which had opened in March 1928. Between 1929 and 1931 she called at Pier 21 a total of 32 times.

In 1930 she was refitted as a four-class ship, with berths for 442 first class, 202 second class, 636 third class and 1,284 fourth class passengers. Also by 1930, her navigation equipment included wireless direction finding. Her final transatlantic voyage to Hoboken began from Rotterdam on 2 October 1931. She called at Halifax on 11 October. She arrived back in Rotterdam on 27 October.

The Great Depression that began in 1929 caused a global shipping slump. Ships on the North Atlantic crossing carried 127,000 fewer passengers in the first half of 1931 than in the first half of 1930. In July 1931 the North Atlantic Steamship Conference met in Paris to discuss the crisis. Several companies proposed cutting fares, and British companies proposed reducing the number of ships. In the week beginning 19 July, sailings of four liners were cancelled by agreement: Cunard Line's RMS Carmania, White Star Line's RMS Cedric, CGT's France, and NASM's Nieuw Amsterdam. By the end of July, the conference agreed reductions to all fares.

On 29 January 1932 NASM sold Nieuw Amsterdam for scrap for 137,000 guilders. She was re-registered in Japan, and a Japanese crew sailed her from Rotterdam to Osaka, where she arrived on 12 May for Torazo Hashimoto to break her up.

== Bibliography ==
- Dowling, R (1909) [1903]. All About Ships & Shipping (3rd ed.). London: Alexander Moring Ltd.
- Lloyd's Register of British and Foreign Shipping. Vol. I.–Steamers. London: Lloyd's Register of Shipping. 1906 – via Internet Archive.
- Lloyd's Register of British and Foreign Shipping. Vol. I.–Steamers. London: Lloyd's Register of Shipping. 1910 – via Internet Archive.
- Lloyd's Register of Shipping (PDF). Vol. II.–Steamers and Motorships of 300 Tons Gross and Over. London: Lloyd's Register of Shipping. 1930 – via Southampton City Council.
- The Marconi Press Agency Ltd (1913). The Year Book of Wireless Telegraphy and Telephony. London: The St Katherine Press.
- The Marconi Press Agency Ltd (1914). The Year Book of Wireless Telegraphy and Telephony. London: The Marconi Press Agency Ltd.
