= James Duane (disambiguation) =

James Duane (1733–1797) was a member of the Continental Congress and the 44th mayor of New York City.

James Duane may also refer to:

- James Duane (fireboat), a fireboat of New York City named after the mayor
- James Joseph Duane (born 1959), American law professor and jurist
- James Chatham Duane (1824–1897), engineering officer in the Union Army during the American Civil War

== See also ==
- James Duane Doty (1799–1865), land speculator and politician
