= Naoum Aronson =

French artist

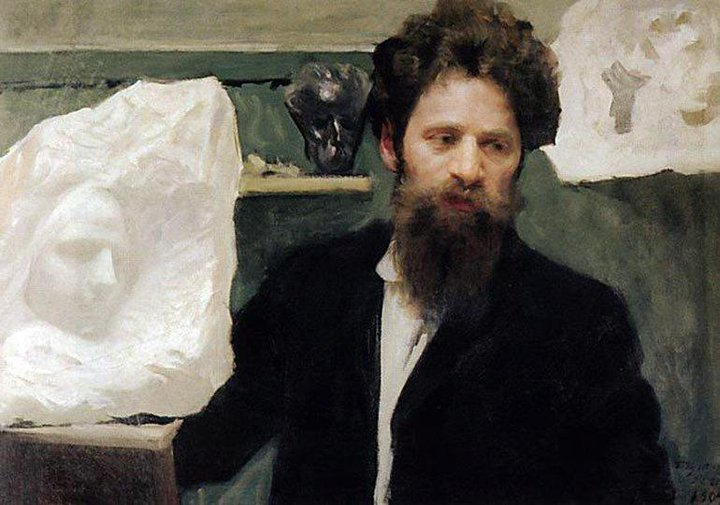
- Portrait by Boris Kustodiev, c. 1910
- Born: December 25, 1872; Krāslava, Vitebsk Governorate, Russian Empire
- Died: September 30, 1943 (aged 70); New York City, U.S.
- Occupation: Sculptor
- Spouse: Dr. Helene Aronson

Naoum Aronson (1872–1943) was a sculptor who lived for most of his life in Paris. He is known principally for his busts of important leaders, including Ludwig van Beethoven, Louis Pasteur, Leo Tolstoy, Grigori Rasputin, and Vladimir Lenin.

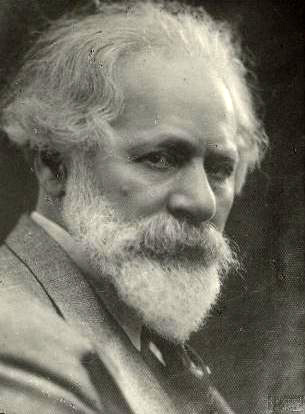
Aronson in 1940

== Biography ==
Aronson was born to a Jewish family in Krāslava, in the Vitebsk Governorate of the Russian Empire (present-day Latvia) in 1872. He studied art at the Vilna Art School before moving to Paris, where he would live for 50 years. He maintained six galleries in Paris, but kept his prize pieces, including the bust of Rasputin, in his Montparnasse studio. After the German invasion of France in 1940, he was forced to flee the country. When he arrived in New York City as a refugee in March 1941 aboard the liner Serpa Pinto, he had little more than some photographs of the sculptures that he had left behind in France. He died two years later in his Upper West Side studio at the age of 71.

== Selected works ==
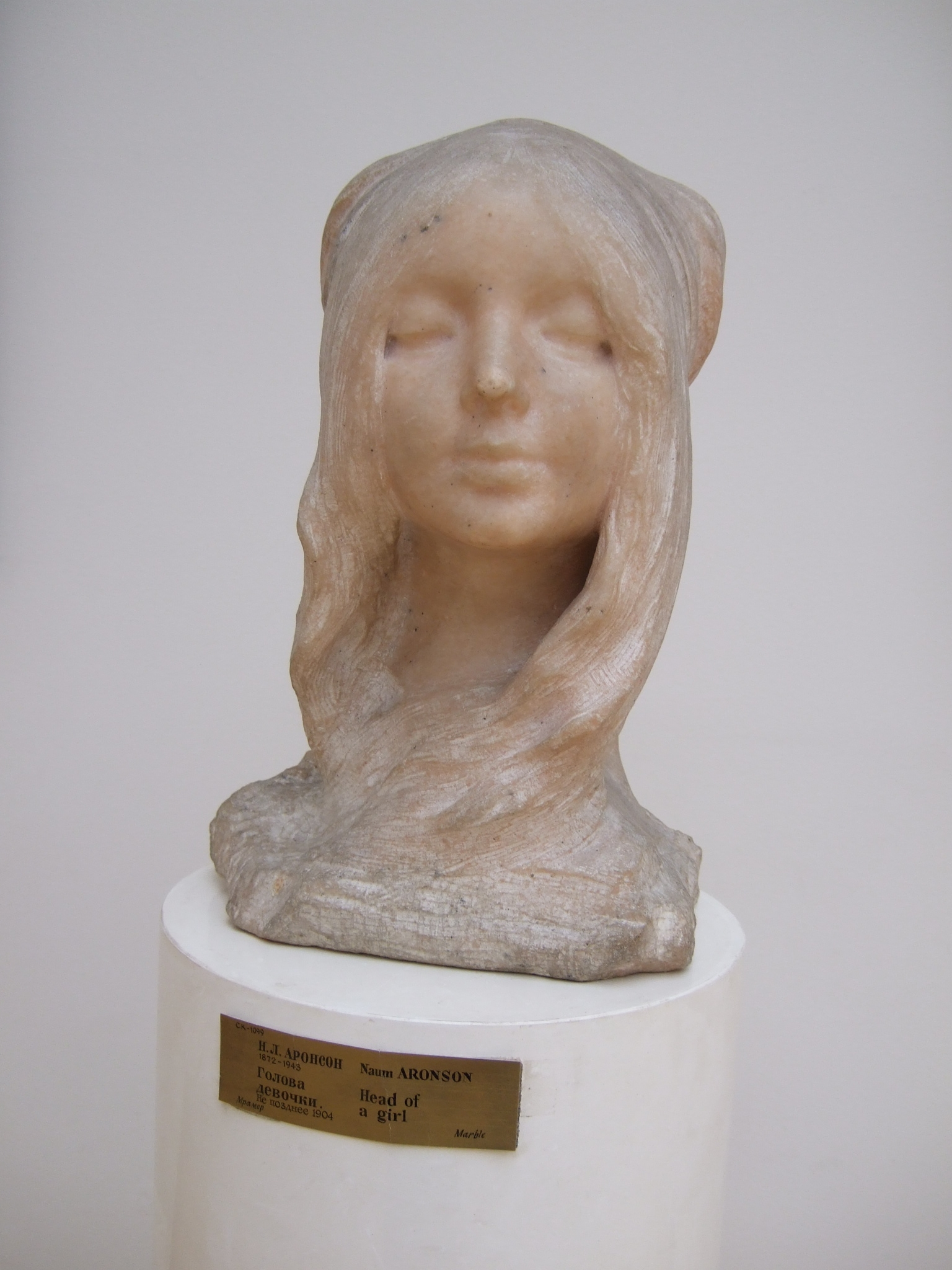
Head of a Girl (c. 1904)

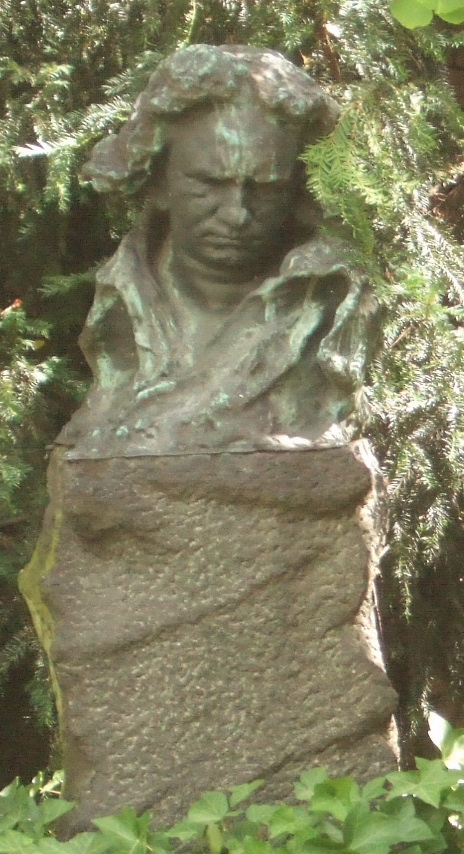
Beethoven (1905)

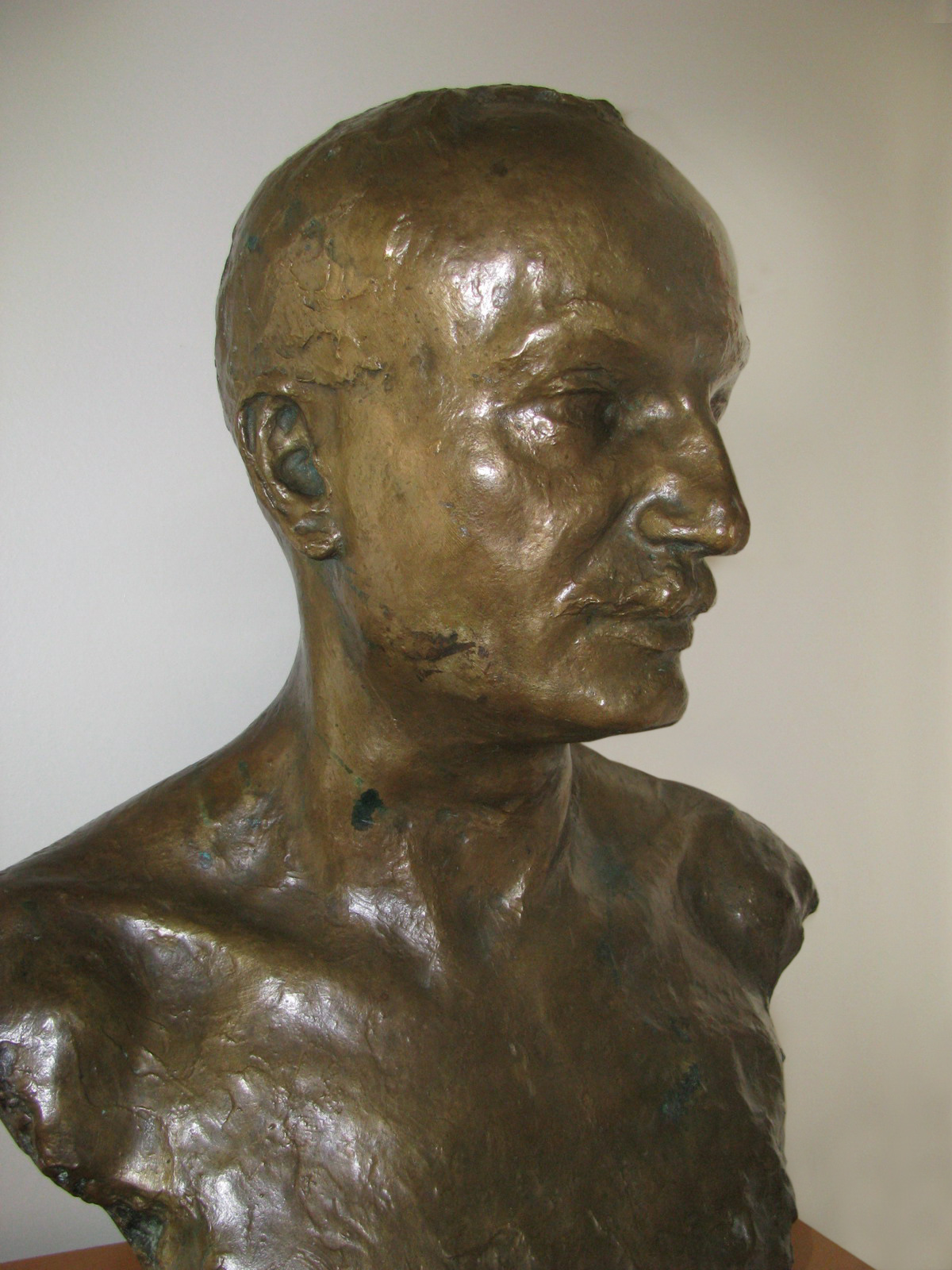
Ivan Panin, biblical numerologist (1916)

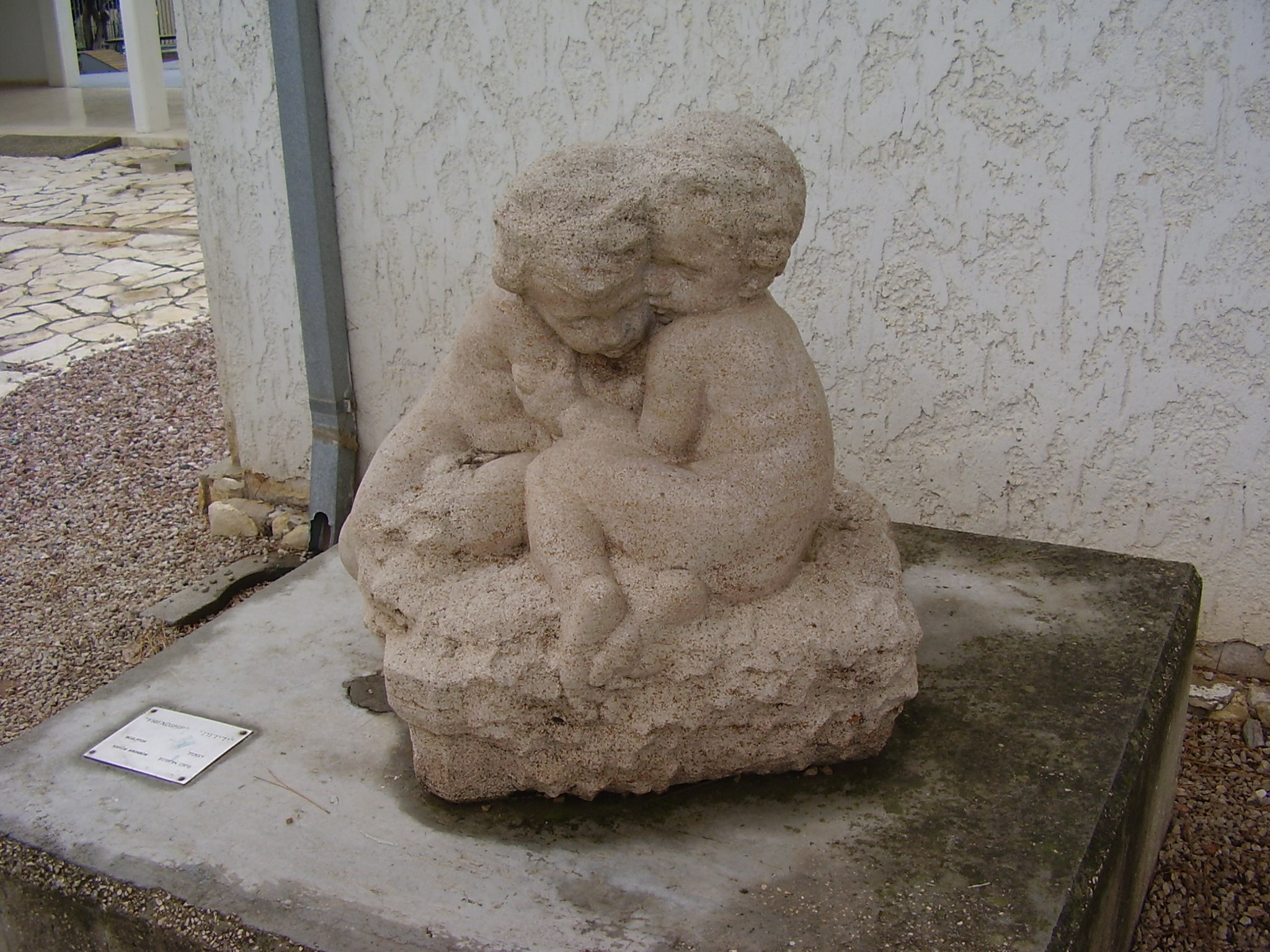
Friendship
