= Companhia Colonial de Navegação =

Portuguese shipping company (1922–1974)

Companhia Colonial de Navegação: flag

The Companhia Colonial de Navegação (CCN) (literally "Colonial Navigation Company") was a Portuguese shipping company that was founded in 1922 and merged into another company in 1974. Its ships carried freight as well as passengers. It was perhaps best known during the Second World War, when its ships, flying the neutral Portuguese flag, were some of the few to provide transatlantic service.

== History ==
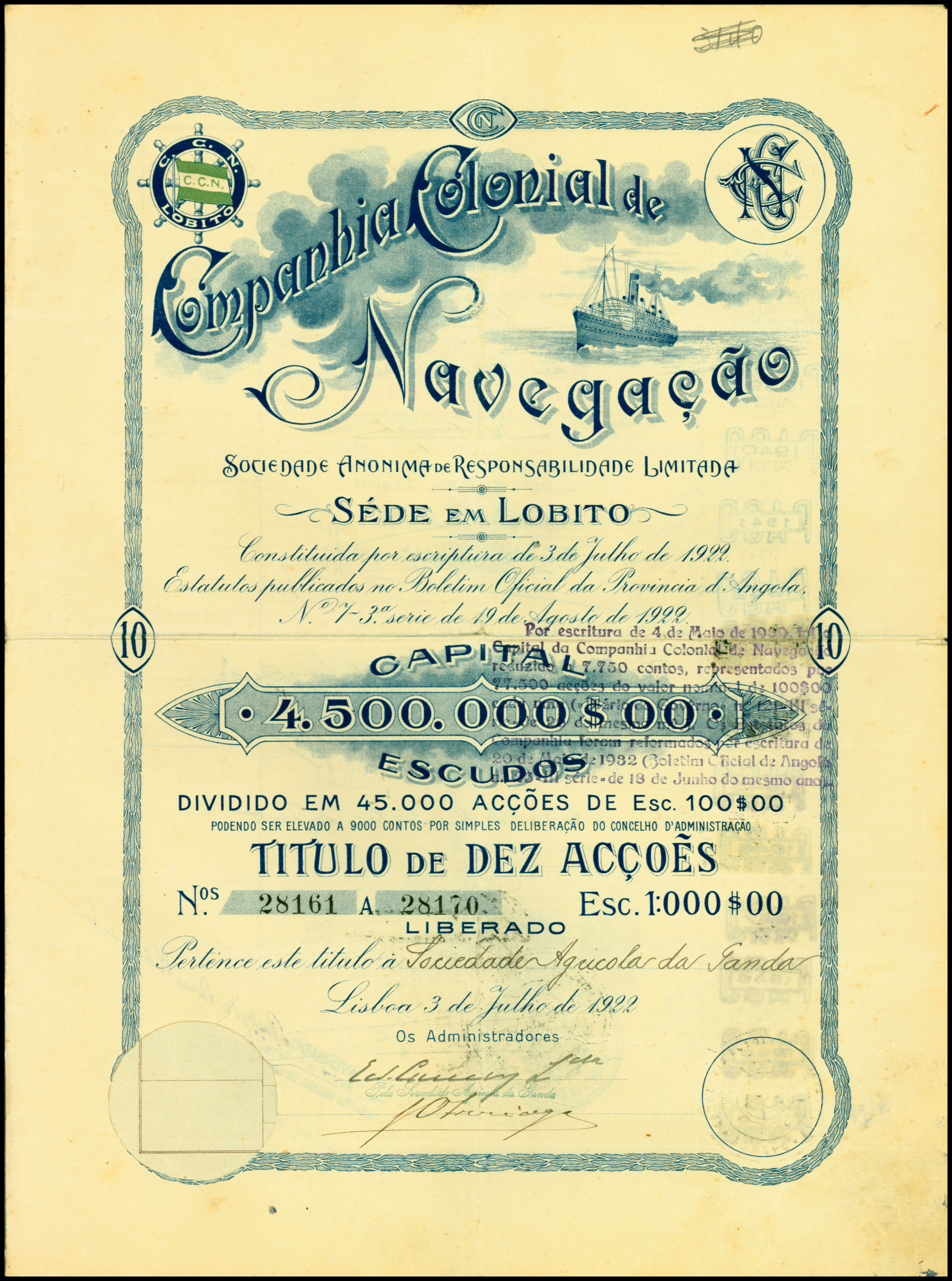
Share of the Companhia Colonial de Navegação, issued 3. July 1922

The company was founded in Angola on 3 July 1922 to serve Portugal's overseas colonies, particularly those in Portuguese Africa. It started service with two ships, Guiné and Ganda, serving destinations in Angola, the Cape Verde Islands, and Guinea Bissau.

During the Second World War, the company expanded to take advantage of its status, as one of the few shipping companies based in a neutral country, to provide service between ports in the Western Hemisphere and Europe. It acquired ships to meet the new demand, notably Princesa Olga from a Yugoslavian company, which it renamed Serpa Pinto and used in voyages between Portugal, the United States, and Brazil. Each of the company's ships had its name and PORTUGAL written in very large letters on their sides, as well as a prominent Portuguese flag. Even so, two of the company's ships, the steamers Cassequel and Ganda, were torpedoed and sunk during the conflict. Serpa Pinto was stopped and boarded in 1944 (May 26) in the mid-Atlantic by the German U-boat U-541, but the ship was ultimately allowed to proceed after the German naval authorities declined to approve its sinking.

After the war, the company again concentrated mostly on serving Portugal and its colonies. In 1961, one of its ships, the Santa Maria, was hijacked to Brazil by forces opposed to Salazar's government.

The increasing popularity of jet air travel from the 1950s onwards reduced demand for the company's passenger shipping services. With declining demand the company converted some of its ships into cruise ships. During the Portuguese Colonial War of the 1960s and early 1970s CCN ships were sometimes used as troopships to transport conscripted Portuguese soldiers to fight in Angola, Mozambique and Guinea.

On 25 April 1974 the Portuguese dictatorship was overthrown by the Carnation Revolution; the new government rapidly granted independence to all Portugal's African colonies. Demand for troopships immediately ceased. Accordingly, following the Carnation revolution, the CCN was combined with the Empresa Insulana de Navegação (EIN) to form the Companhia Portuguesa de Transportes Marítimos (CPTM) and the newly-merged company was nationalised. The CPTM ceased operations in 1985 and was subsequently closed.

== Ships ==
- - 1922: Ganda* – Ex General Allenby (1898–1933)
- - 1922: Guiné – Ex La Plata (1898–1930)
- - 1924: Lobito – Ex Thora Menzell (1906–1953)
- - 1925: Amboim* – Ex Sardinia (1898–1933)
- - 1925: Benguela – Ex Galata (1905–1933)
- - 1925: Bissau – Ex Lagos (1884– )
- - 1926: Cassequel – Ex Numantia (1901–1941)
- - 1926: Loanda* – Ex Würzburg (1900–1938)
- - 1926: Mendes Berata – Ex Hochfeld (1897–1927)
- - 1928: João Belo* – Ex Gertrud Woermann (1905–1950)
- - 1929: Colonial* – Ex Ypiranga (1908–1950)
- - 1929: Sena – Ex Marienburg (1922–1952)
- - 1929: Malange – Ex Hornfels (1904–1961), 1949 sold to Turkey
- - 1930: Mouzinho* – Ex Corcovado (1907–1954)
- - 1930: Ganda – Ex Plauen (1907–1941)
- - 1930: Guiné – Ex São Miguel (1905–1950)
- - 1930: Pungue – Ex Morocco (1900–1961)
- - 1931: Buzi – Ex Zambesia (1903– ), 1934 sold to Mauritius
- - 1940: Serpa Pinto* – Ex Ebro (1915–1954)
- - 1941: Micondo – Ex Butio (1904– )
- - 1942: Luango – Ex Vigo (1905– ), 1949 sold to Panama
- - 1943: Lugela – Ex Dortmund (1926–1971)
- - 1943: Huambo – Ex Polaria (1919–1950)
- - 1943: Bailundo – Ex Sofia (1914–1961), 1949 sold to Turkey
- - 1943: Buzi – Ex Andalusia (1921–1964), 1951 sold to Panama
- - 1946: Benguela – 1946–1974, then transferred to CPTM
- - 1947: Lunda – Ex Luther Hurd (1944–1975), 1956 sold to Cuba
- - 1947: Pebane – Ex Phineas Windsor (1944–1979), 1956 sold to Cuba
- - 1947: Quionga – Ex B. A. Follensby (1945– ), 1956 sold to Cuba
- - 1947: Pátria* –1947–1973
- - 1947: Ganda – 1947–1974, then transferred to CPTM
- - 1948: Luanda – 1948–1973
- - 1948: Amboim – 1948–1974
- - 1948: Império* – 1948–1974
- - 1950: Chaimite – 1950–;...., in 1973 sold to UK
- - 1950: Nampula – 1950–1973
- - 1952: Sena – 1952–1973
- - 1952: Vera Cruz* – 1952–1973
- - 1953: Santa Maria* – 1953–1974
- - 1954: Uíge* – 1954–1974, then transferred to CPTM.
- - 1959: Lobito – 1959–1974, then transferred to CPTM.
- - 1961: Infante Dom Henrique* – 1961–1974, then transferred to CPTM.
- - 1966: Lugela – 1966–1974, then transferred to CPTM.
- - 1968: Porto – 1968–1974, then transferred to CPTM.
- - 1969: Bailundo – 1969–1974, then transferred to CPTM.
- - 1971: Malange – 1971–1974, then transferred to CPTM.
- - 1972: Bernardino Corrêa – 1972–1974, then transferred to CPTM.
- - 1972: Pungue – Ex Passat (1967–1974), then transferred to CPTM.

*: Passenger ship
