= William J. Gaynor (fireboat) =

Fireboat William J. Gaynor, in 1915.
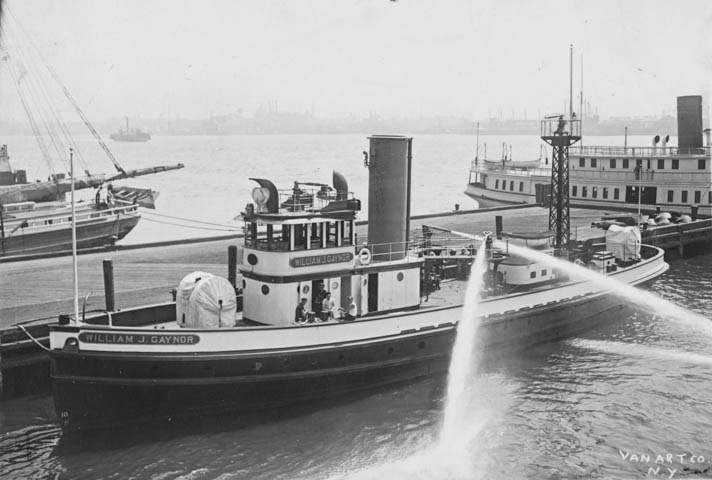

History

New York City Fire Department
- Name: William J. Gaynor
- Namesake: William J. Gaynor
- Owner: New York City
- Operator: New York City Fire Department
- Cost: $118,000
- Launched: June 26, 1913
- Sponsored by: Marion Gaynor
- In service: 1914
- Out of service: 1961
- Fate: Put up for sale in 1961

General characteristics
- Class & type: fireboat
- Length: 118 ft (36 m)
- Beam: 25 ft (7.6 m)

The Fire Department of New York operated a fireboat named William J. Gaynor from 1914 to 1961.

Construction began in March 1913. Her cost was projected to be $118,000. She was 118 feet (36 m) long, with a beam of 25 feet (7.6 m). According to The New York Times her pumps would "normally" project 7,000 gallons per minute. However, "under high pressure", she could throw 13,000 gallons per minute.

The vessel was named after a former Mayor of New York City, William J. Gaynor. Gaynor's daughter Marion launched the vessel, on June 26, 1913, at a ceremony in Elizabethport, New Jersey, attended by other senior officials.

She was put up for sale in February, 1961. She was no longer in operational condition when she was put up for sale.

== Operational history ==
On January 22, 1916, the Norwegian cargo ship Sygna carrying railway supplies from the neutral United States to Russia, returned to port when crew discovered a serious fire in one of her holds. William J. Gaynor was assigned to put out the freighter's fire. At the inquiry her officer's praised the freighter's pilot for preventing the vessels from coming to shore, and starting fires there. Sygna' propeller cut a gash in William J. Gaynor's hull. She had to call on a "wrecking tug" to open Sygna's hatch before she could suppress the fire in the hold.

On June 21, 1921, William J. Gaynor was called to Barren Island in Jamaica Bay when a warehouse belonging to the United States Shipping Board was found to be ablaze. By the time the fireboat arrived land-based firefighters had been unable to prevent the fire from spreading to two of the shipping board's four derelict ships. The cargo ships Polar Bear and City of Omaha were also ablaze. William J. Gaynor with the aid of land-based firefighters, and the skeleton crews of two more shipping board vessels, was able to keep the two remaining vessels from burning.

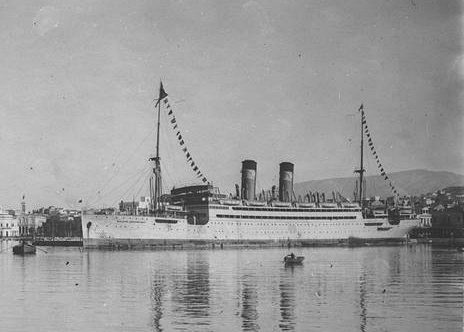
William J. Gaynor and John Purroy Mitchel fought a cargo fire aboard the ocean liner Byron in 1926

On October 5, 1926, the crew of the ocean liner Byron discovered a fire in one of her cargo holds. William J. Gaynor was the first fireboat on scene, and was joined by John Purroy Mitchel. The two fireboats pumped water into the burning hold, and Byron reached the quarantine station under her own power.

In 1932 Popular Science magazine published a former crew member's account of William J. Gaynor' fight of a fire aboard a munitions barge, during World War One. The crew member described how, after the fire had been put out, the officer in command of Fort Hamilton, where the barge was being unloaded, praised how he and his colleagues stuck by their stations, and didn't withdraw, when the shells started to explode. He wrote that they took the praise and didn't inform him they had no choice, since they had run aground, and couldn't move until the next tide raised the river's level.

In July, 1958, Otto H. Winderl, Gaynor's pilot, and Eugene E. Kenny, Gaynor's Captain, were called to testify as a witness at a Coast Guard board of inquiry into the deadly collision of the cargo ship Nebraska and tanker Empress Bay. The tanker burst into flame. Gaynor and other service vessels had difficulty rescuing survivors. Nebraska's propeller ripped a large hole in Gaynor's hull. Two crewmembers died, in the blaze, but 49 others were saved.
