= RMS Ebro =

Irish-built ocean liner

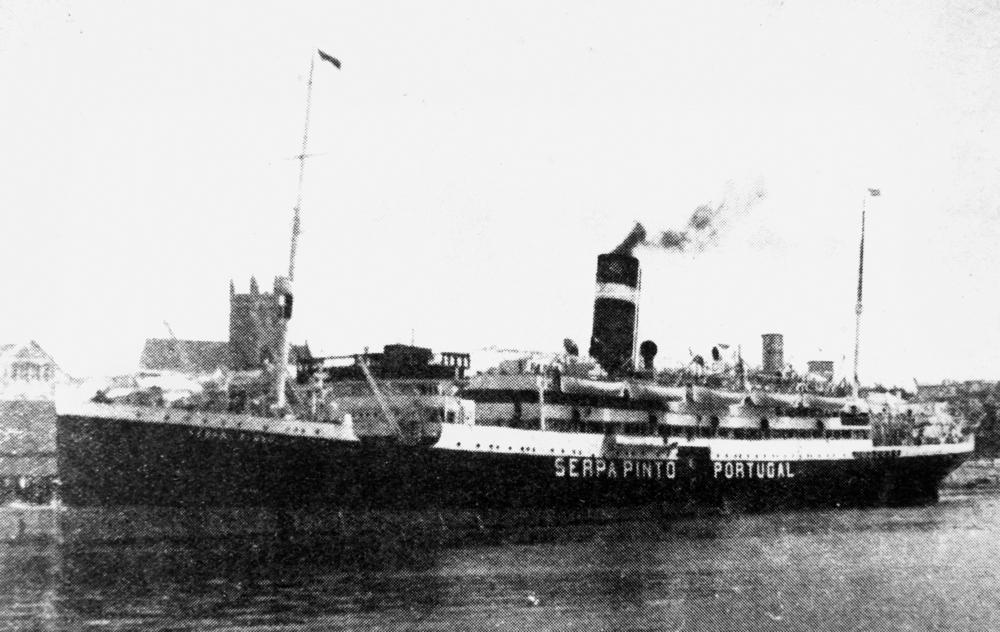
- The ship as Serpa Pinto in the Second World War

History
- Name: 1914: Ebro; 1935: Princesa Olga; 1940: Serpa Pinto
- Namesake: 1914: Ebro; 1935: Princess Olga; 1940: Alexandre de Serpa Pinto
- Owner: 1914: RMSP; 1922: PSNC; 1935: Jugoslavenska Lloyd; 1940: Cia Colonial de Nav
- Operator: 1915: (United Kingdom) Royal Navy; 1920: PSNC
- Port of registry: 1914: (United Kingdom) Belfast; 1935: (Kingdom of Yugoslavia) Dubrovnik; 1940: (Portugal) Lisbon
- Route: 1920: New York – Valparaíso; 1935: Trieste – Haifa; 1940: Lisbon – Santos; 1941: alternately Lisbon – New York; Lisbon – Santos; 1945: Lisbon – Santos; 1953: Vigo – Havana
- Builder: Workman, Clark & Co, Belfast
- Yard number: 333
- Launched: 8 September 1914
- Completed: January 1915
- Out of service: 1930–1935; August 1948 – January 1949
- Identification: UK official number 136346; 1915: code letters JHMV; Royal Navy pennant numbers: April 1915: M 78; January 1918: MI 70; April 1918: MI 37; 1918: call sign MTJ; 1930: call sign GQRL; 1935: call sign YTFK; 1940: call sign CSBA
- Fate: scrapped 1955

General characteristics
- Type: ocean liner
- Tonnage: 8,480 GRT, 5,174 NRT
- Length: 450.3 ft (137.3 m)
- Beam: 57.8 ft (17.6 m)
- Draught: 25 ft 6 in (7.8 m)
- Depth: 30.6 ft (9.3 m)
- Decks: 2
- Installed power: 1,055 NHP
- Propulsion: 2 × quadruple-expansion engines; 2 × screws
- Speed: 15 knots (28 km/h)
- Capacity: passengers: 278 × 1st class; 328 × 2nd class
- Complement: as AMC: 33 officers; 230 ratings
- Crew: as ocean liner: 165
- Sensors & processing systems: submarine signalling
- Armament: as AMC: 6 × 6-inch QF guns; 2 × 6-pounder guns; depth charges
- Notes: sister ship: Essequibo

RMS Ebro was an ocean liner that was launched in Ireland in 1914. With changes of ownership she was renamed Princesa Olga in 1935 and Serpa Pinto in 1940. She was scrapped in Belgium in 1955.

Ebro was launched for the Royal Mail Steam Packet Company (RMSP), but requisitioned in 1915 as the armed merchant cruiser (AMC) HMS Ebro for the Royal Navy. In 1922 RMSP transferred her to the Pacific Steam Navigation Company (PSNC). She was a Royal Mail Ship until 1935, when Jugoslavenska Lloyd bought her and renamed her Princesa Olga. In 1940 the Companhia Colonial de Navegação (CCN) bought her and renamed her Serpa Pinto.

As HMS Ebro in the First World War she served with the 10th Cruiser Squadron from 1915 to 1917, and escorted convoys between the British Isles and Sierra Leone in 1918. As RMS Ebro she sailed between New York and Chile via the Panama Canal. As Princesa Olga she sailed between Italy and Palestine. As Serpa Pinto in the Second World War she made several transatlantic crossings, on which she carried many refugees who had escaped German-occupied Europe.

This was the third of four Royal Mail ships that were named Ebro. The first was a sail- and steamship that was built in 1865 as Rakaia, bought and renamed Ebro in 1871, and wrecked in 1882. The second was a steamship that was built in 1896, sold and renamed in 1903, and sunk by a mine in 1917. The fourth was a motor ship that was built in 1952, sold and renamed in 1969, and scrapped in 1978.

== Building and introduction ==
In 1914 Workman, Clark and Company of Belfast launched a pair of steamships for RMSP's service between England and the West Indies. Yard number 334 was launched on 6 July as Essequibo, and yard number 333 was launched on 8 September as Ebro.

Ebro's registered length was 450.3 ft (137.3 m), her beam was 57.8 ft (17.6 m), her depth was 30.6 ft (9.3 m), and her draught was 25 ft 6 in (7.8 m). Her tonnages were 8,480 GRT and 5,174 NRT. She had twin screws, each driven by a quadruple-expansion engine. The combined power of her twin engines was rated at 1,055 NHP, and gave her a speed of 15 knots (28 km/h).

RMSP registered Ebro at Belfast. Her UK official number was 136346, her code letters were JHMV, and her wireless call sign was MTJ.

Ebro and Essequibo were described as "the two finest ships ever built" for RMSP's route between Britain and the West Indies. Ebro made her maiden voyage on the route, but then the Admiralty requisitioned her for conversion into an AMC. Essequibo served the route slightly longer, until after less than a year she was requisitioned for conversion into a hospital ship.

== HMS Ebro ==
Ebro was armed with six 6-inch QF guns, two 6-pounder guns, and depth charge launching apparatus. The Royal Navy commissioned her at the Royal Albert Dock, London on 15 April 1915, with the pennant number M 78.

Ebro left London on 21 April. She was off Gravesend and Sheerness in Kent until 15 May, when she left to join the 10th Cruiser Squadron at sea. She served with the squadron until December 1917, patrolling around the Faroe Islands, Iceland, and the Norwegian Sea. Her usual port for bunkering was Glasgow.

On 15 December 1917 Ebro left Glasgow for the last time. She steamed to Freetown in Sierra Leone, where she arrived on 27 December. From then until November 1918 she escorted convoys between Freetown and the British Isles, with Devonport as her usual base in home waters. She was in port in Avonmouth from 18 May to 4 June, and from 17 July to 2 August. On 24 November she reached Tilbury, the next day she reached the Royal Albert Dock, and on 6 December all of her ammunition was unloaded for her to be decommissioned.

== RMS Ebro ==
The Admiralty returned Ebro to RMSP. According to one source, on 28 October 1919 she traversed the Panama Canal for the first time, heading from the Caribbean to the Pacific, in the service of RMSP's subsidiary PSNC. Certainly by December 1919 she was working for PSNC. On 6 December she left Kingston, Jamaica, and on 11 December she reached New York. On 16 December PSNC's New York agents, Sanderson and Sons, gave a banquet for 175 shipping and railroad men aboard Ebro at Pier 42 in the North River. On 18 December she was due to start a voyage to Bermuda for Christmas. Lloyd Sanderson told diners that in the New Year, Ebro and Essequibo would start a service between New York and Valparaíso via the Panama Canal, and that by June 2020 sailings on the route should be leaving New York every fortnight. Ebro left Bermuda on 26 December, and got back to New York on 29 December.

On 7 January 1920 Ebro left New York on her first voyage to Valparaíso. Her ports of call included Mollendo in Peru on 26 January. She reached Valparaíso on 1 February. On her return voyage her ports of call included Colón, Panama on 29 February, and she got back to New York on 8 March.

On 1 June 1921 Ebro reached New York carrying $172,884 from ports on the Pacific coast of South America. That summer, transatlantic passenger ships were fully booked, and RMSP chartered Ebro back from PSNC to provide a transatlantic relief service in June or July. By 6 August she was back on her route between New York and Valparaíso.

On 15 April 1922 a lighter broke adrift in New York and struck Ebro's port side aft. Two of her hull plates were damaged and a porthole glass was broken, but she was able to leave port that day for Valparaíso. By the end of 1922 RMSP transferred ownership of Ebro and Essequibo to PSNC, in exchange for certain PSNC ships including Orbita. Ebro remained on PSNC's route between New York and Valparaíso via the Panama Canal.

When Ebro docked at Pier 42 on the North River on 19 January 1923, US Customs men seized "a large quantity" of liquor, narcotics, and several automatic firearms that were not on her manifest. In March 1924 Customs men in New York raided RMSP's Orduña and confiscated liquor and morphine valued at $16,000. William Hayward, United States Attorney for the Southern District of New York, sought to seize Orduña for violations of Federal law. Five members of her crew pleaded guilty to bringing liquor into the port. As a result, from April 1924 RMSP and PSNC posted two or more armed guards aboard each of their ships when they were in port in New York.

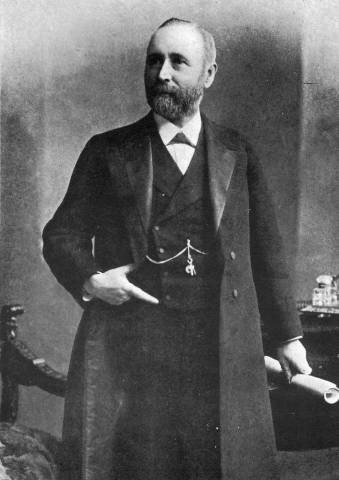
Viscount Pirrie

In March 1924 Viscount Pirrie, Chairman of Harland & Wolff, voyaged from Southampton to South America with his wife Viscountess Pirrie and her sister. They travelled overland from Buenos Aires to Chile, where they embarked aboard Ebro. Pirrie caught pneumonia in Antofagasta, and his condition worsened when the ship reached Iquique. At Panama City two nurses embarked to care for him. By then he was very weak, but insisted on being brought on deck to see the canal. He admired how Ebro was handled through the locks.

On 7 June Pirrie died. His body was embalmed. On 13 June Ebro reached Pier 42 on the North River, where Pirrie's friend Baron Inverforth and his wife met Viscountess Pirrie and her sister. UK ships in the port of New York lowered their flags to half-mast, and Pirrie's body was transferred to Pier 59, where it was embarked on White Star Line's RMS Olympic, one of the largest ships Pirrie ever built, to be repatriated to the UK.

Ebro was built as a coal-burner. By August 1924 she had been converted to burn oil.

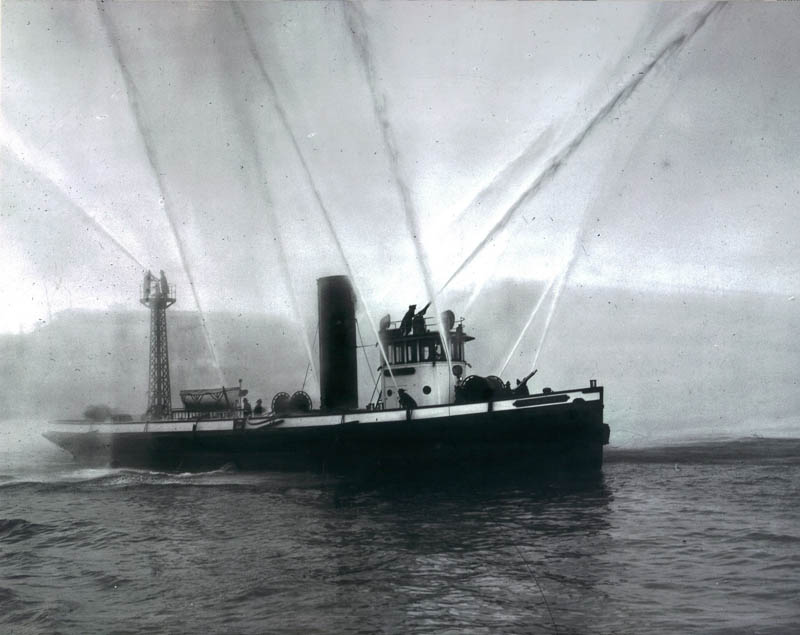
New York fireboat Thomas Willett

At about 02:00 hrs on 5 July 1927, as Ebro neared New York, fire was discovered in 800 bales of cotton in her number 6 cargo hold. Her Master, Captain Ellis Roberts, ordered all her hatches battened down and all ventilators closed, both to minimise the air supply to the fire, and to prevent passengers from being aware that there was a fire aboard. The ship cleared quarantine just before 09:00 hrs and docked in the North River at 10:00 hrs.

Five minutes after the last of her passengers had disembarked, Roberts ordered number 6 hatch opened, and longshoremen wearing gas masks went below in relays to raise bales of cotton to reach the seat of the fire. The New York City Fire Department fireboats John Purroy Mitchel and Thomas Willett poured water into the hold, and by 14:00 hrs the fire was extinguished. Longshoremen had removed 230 of the cotton bales. The remainder, valued at $50,000, were written off as a total loss.

On 10 August 1929 a gale hit Chile. Ebro was in Antofagasta, and she and other ships put to sea to ride out the storm. The harbour breakwater was almost totally destroyed.

By 1930 Ebro's wireless call sign was GQRL. By 1934 this had superseded her code letters.

The effects of the Wall Street crash of 1929 included a global slump in shipping. From December 1930 Ebro was laid up at Avonmouth.

== Princesa Olga ==
In 1935 Jugoslavenska Lloyd bought the ship and renamed her Princesa Olga, after Princess Olga of Greece and Denmark, wife of Prince Paul of Yugoslavia. The ship was registered in Dubrovnik, and her call sign was YTFK. She ran a seasonal service from April to November between Trieste in Italy and Haifa in Palestine via the Corinth Canal. Her ports of call were Venice, Split, Gruž in Dubrovnik, Piraeus, and Alexandria.

== Serpa Pinto ==
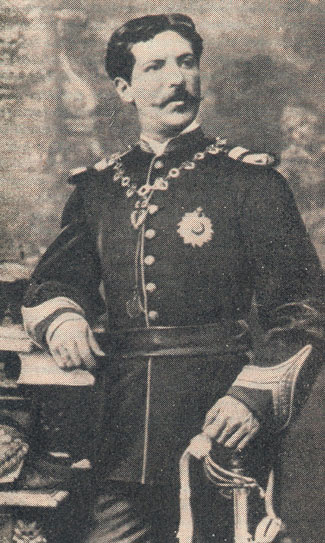
Alexandre de Serpa Pinto

In 1940 CCN bought Princesa Olga and renamed her Serpa Pinto, after the explorer Alexandre de Serpa Pinto (1846–1900). She was registered in Lisbon, and her call sign was CSBA.

From May 1940 Serpa Pinto served CCN's route between Lisbon and Beira in Moçambique. Later that year CCN transferred her to its route between Lisbon and Santos in Brazil. Between then and the end of the war in 1945 she made ten round trips on the Brazil route.

On 8 September the German auxiliary cruiser Widder captured the Greek cargo ship Antonios Chandris in the South Atlantic. The German commander ordered the crew to abandon ship, gave them extra food and water, scuttled Antonios Chandris, and left the crew at sea in two lifeboats at position 11°25′N 34°10′W.

The two boats became separated. A month later, on 8 October, the 22 occupants of one boat sighted Serpa Pinto and signalled to her with distress rockets. Serpa Pinto rescued the survivors and landed them at Rio de Janeiro. On 3 November they embarked on another CCN ship, Tagus, to return to Europe. A UK cargo ship found the other lifeboat, and on 21 October landed its ten surviving occupants at Buenos Aires.

From December 1940 CCN changed Serpa Pinto's schedule. Her voyages between Lisbon and Brazil were to alternate with voyages between Lisbon and New York. Extra third class accommodation was installed in her cargo holds. One-way fares were $180 in third class, and from $360 to $540 in first class. On 4 January 1941 she reached New York two days behind schedule, due to several days of gales in the North Atlantic. She landed 628 passengers, of whom between 90 and 95 percent were refugees from German-occupied Europe. Passengers complained that the food on board had been very bad, the ship was under-manned, the crew was over-worked, and water had got into some of the third class accommodation during the gales.

Among the passengers were Czechoslovak, French, and German film producers, directors, and screenwriters, including the Czech Paul Schiller. Also aboard was a party of 50 German Jewish refugees on their way to join the Jewish community in Sosúa in the Dominican Republic. Porto Rico Line held its ship Coamo in New York for three hours to give the party time to make their connection. A tugboat ferried the party to Coamo.

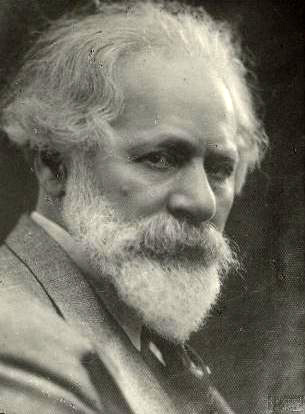
Naoum Aronson

Serpa Pinto's next North Atlantic crossing started from Lisbon on 15 March 1941. The Portuguese authorities denied CCN permission to add berths for another 170 passengers to her accommodation. Even so, she carried fourth class accommodation in three sections in her cargo holds, with improvised bunk beds between decks, for which the one-way fare was $170. The UK authorities ordered her to make an unscheduled stop for inspection. She arrived in Hamilton, Bermuda on 24 March, where the British detained her for three days. She reached Stapleton, Staten Island on 30 March carrying 640 passengers, including the Jewish sculptor Naoum Aronson; and Nessim Ovadia, Chief Rabbi of the Sephardic Jews in Paris.

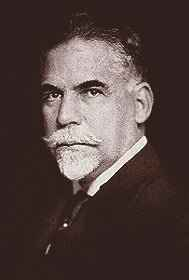
Washington Luís

On another crossing from Lisbon to New York, Serpa Pinto reached Pier 8 at Stapleton on 23 June with 685 passengers and six stowaways. Her passengers included 29 survivors from Zamzam, which the German auxiliary cruiser Atlantis had sunk in the South Atlantic two months previously. Also aboard were Rabbi Menachem Mendel Schneerson, Washington Luís, former President of Brazil, and a pair of Polish teenage aristocrats bringing a Stradivarius violin that they were to deliver to Bronisław Huberman.

On 7 September 1941 the Jewish Telegraphic Agency reported that a party 56 refugee children was leaving Marseille in Vichy France that day, and was due to leave Lisbon on 11 September aboard Serpa Pinto. The USHMM's Holocaust Encyclopedia states that on 24 September the ship reached New York and disembarked 57 children.

The American Jewish Joint Distribution Committee (JDC), in consultation with the HICEM, arranged for Serpa Pinto to embark refugees in Lisbon, sail on 25 October, embark more refugees at Casablanca in French Morocco, and take them across the North Atlantic to the Dominican Republic, Cuba, Mexico, and New York. The start of the voyage was delayed, and Serpa Pinto left Lisbon with 138 passengers on 17 November. She called at Casablanca, where she embarked another 890 passengers, including 450 Spanish Republicans bound for Mexico. Her passengers also included many Jewish refugees, most of them from internment camps in Vichy France or forced labour camps in French Morocco.

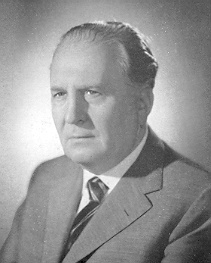
Randolfo Pacciardi

The UK again detained Serpa Pinto in Bermuda, this time for four days. They removed four passengers: a German couple and a Spanish couple. During the voyage three passengers died: two elderly women, and a German 12-year-old girl. 150 refugees disambarked in Santo Domingo, 239 disembarked in Cuba, and by 22 December the ship had reached Vera Cruz. On 26 December the ship reached Pier 9 on Staten Island, where her disembarking passengers included the anti-fascist Randolfo Pacciardi. Two stowaways were found aboard and sent to Ellis Island.

On 9 February 1942 it was reported that 150 Polish Jewish refugees, accompanied by a JDC representative, had left Lisbon aboard Serpa Pinto to be resettled in Jamaica.

Serpa Pinto also continued to serve Brazil. On 6 May 1942 three members of her crew were arrested in Rio de Janeiro on suspicion of smuggling platinum, allegedly on behalf of a German diplomat.

Serpa Pinto's crossed from Lisbon to New York in June 1942. On 18 June the UK detained her in Bermuda. On 25 June she reached Staten Island, where she disambarked 677 refugees. They included 50 children in the care of USCOM, of whom 23 were the children of Spanish Republicans, 13 were Germans, and 13 were Poles. Adult refugees aboard included the son, daughter-in-law, and grandchildren of Alfred Dreyfus. The JDC cared for most of the refugees, and paid the fares of those who could not afford to pay for themselves. The ship was due to leave New York on 2 July on her return voyage to Lisbon. However, US authorities held her for at least two days, reportedly over a dispute with the German government about which US port the Swedish liner Drottningholm should use when repatriating diplomats on either side of the war.

In 1942 Serpa Pinto made a crossing from Lisbon to Baltimore. The UK detained her in Bermuda on 22 September. On 11 October she reached Baltimore, where she disembarked nearly 300 passengers, 120 of whom were Jewish refugees, most of them from France. Her passengers also included 48 other French, 66 Poles, 27 US citizens, 26 Portuguese, and 13 stateless people. The Baltimore branch of the HIAS met the Jewish refugees.

Also in 1942 Serpa Pinto made crossings from Lisbon to Philadelphia. On 30 November she landed Jewish refugees at Philadelphia, where they were met by the New York branch of the HIAS. On a subsequent crossing to Philadelphia she passed the Delaware Breakwater on 24 January 1943, but was then stopped off Marcus Hook, Pennsylvania for five US government agencies to question her 188 passengers before allowing them to disembark. They included 100 refugees, 43 US citizens, 36 children, and 35 stateless people. They were allowed to disembark on 26 January.

On 17 April 1943 Serpa Pinto left Lisbon on another crossing to the USA. Her passengers included 32 children of various nationalities, who had been refugees in Spain since the German and Italian invasion of Vichy France in November 1942.

On 13 March 1944 Serpa Pinto reached Lisbon from the US and Canada carrying 125 UK children to be repatriated. On 7 April she reached Philadelphia carrying 376 refugees. 274 were transferred to trains to take them to Toronto and Montreal. This was the largest group of refugees that Canada had allowed to enter the country since the war began. The JDC paid their travel costs, and the United Jewish Refugee Agency, War Relief Agency, and the Jewish Immigrant Aid Society, guaranteed that they would not become a charge upon public funds. The group going to Canada included Alexis Kanner, then two years old. The remainder were repatriated US citizens, and passengers travelling onward to Latin America.

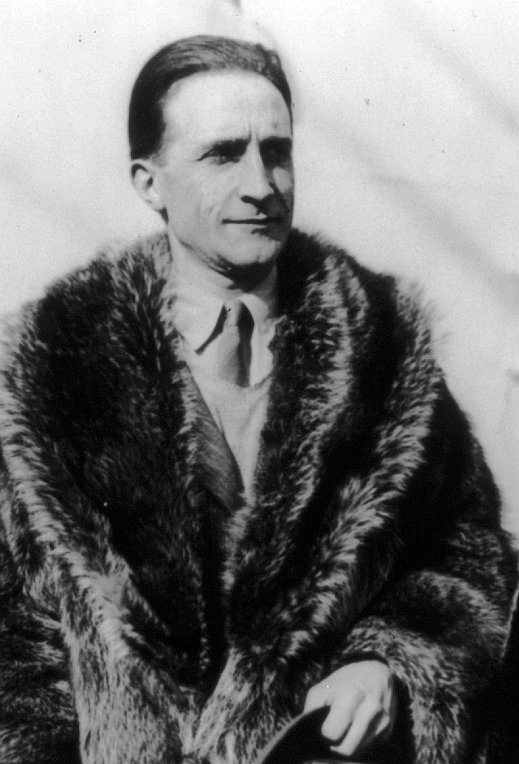
Marcel Duchamp

Other notable refugees who left Europe via Serpa Pinto include Marcel Duchamp, Marcel Reich (who became Marc Rich) with his parents in 1941, and Simone Weil in 1942. One of her child refugees was Wulf Wolodi Grajonca, who became the rock music promoter Bill Graham. The ship became nicknamed the Friendship Vessel or Destiny Ship.

=== Detained by U-541 ===
On 16 May 1944 Serpa Pinto left Lisbon for Philadelphia. She called at Porto on 18 May, and Ponta Delgada in the Azores on 21 May. On 26 May U-541 stopped her in mid-Atlantic. The U-boat commander took two prisoner two young men from the US, and ordered her 154 remaining passengers and 155 crew to abandon ship. Three people were killed in accidents while abandoning ship. The ship's doctor died by falling from a rope ladder into the sea. One of her cooks was killed by the swinging block of a block and tackle hitting him on the head. The 16-month-old daughter of a Polish refugee couple was killed when one of the lifeboats was being lowered and one of the boat's falls broke, tipping all of its occupants into the sea.

The U-boat commander signalled the Oberkommando der Marine (OKM) for permission to sink the liner. For nine hours the passengers and crew waited in the lifeboats for the reply from the OKM. Twelve hours after the ship was stopped, U-541 was ordered to let her resume her voyage. The passengers and crew reboarded her, and after another five hours Serpa Pinto resumed her voyage. She reached Philadelphia on 31 May.

=== Post-war years ===
On 10 October 1945 Serpa Pinto left Lisbon on her eleventh voyage to Brazil. In August 1948, en route from Brazil to Portugal, she suffered engine failure. She was out of service for repairs until January 1949. From 14 August 1953 her route was Vigo – Lisbon – Funchal – La Guaira – Curaçao – Havana. She made twelve round trips on this route. On 9 July 1954 she left Lisbon on a final voyage to Santos, via São Vicente, Cape Verde and Rio de Janeiro. On 6 September 1955 she left Lisbon under tow to Antwerp in Belgium to be scrapped.

== Bibliography ==
- Ammann, Daniel (2009). The King of Oil: The Secret Lives of Marc Rich. New York: St. Martin's Press. ISBN 978-0-312-57074-3.
- Bettencourt, M. Ortins (27 May 1944). "Notícia da iminência de afundamento do navio "Serpa Pinto" por um submarino alemão". Arquivo Salazar, MA-1B, cx. 354, capilha 38 (in Portuguese). Lisbon: Torre do Tombo National Archive.
- de Dijn, Rosinne (2009). Das Schicksalsschiff, Rio de Janeiro – Lissabon – New York (in German). Munich: Deutsche Verlags-Anstalt. ISBN 978-3-421-04350-4.
- Haws, Duncan (1982). Royal Mail & Nelson Lines. Merchant Fleets. Vol. 5. Crowborough: Travel Creatours Ltd Publications. ISBN 0-946378-00-2.
- Lloyd's Register of Shipping. Vol. II.–Steamers. London: Lloyd's Register of Shipping. 1917 – via Internet Archive.
- Lloyd's Register of Shipping (PDF). Vol. II.–Steamers and Motorships over 300 Tons. London: Lloyd's Register of Shipping. 1935 – via Southampton City Council.
- Lloyd's Register of Shipping (PDF). Vol. I.–Steamers and Motorship of 300 tons. Trawlers, tugs, dredgers, &c. Sailing vessels. Shipowners, &c. London: Lloyd's Register of Shipping. 1940 – via Southampton City Council.
- The Marconi Press Agency Ltd (1918). The Year Book of Wireless Telegraphy and Telephony. London: The Wireless Press, Ltd.
- Mercantile Navy List. London: Peter Owens. 1930 – via Crew List Index Project.
- Nicol, Stuart (2001). MacQueen's Legacy; A History of the Royal Mail Line. Vol. One. Brimscombe Port and Charleston, SC: Tempus Publishing. ISBN 0-7524-2118-2.
- Osborne, Richard; Spong, Harry & Grover, Tom (2007). Armed Merchant Cruisers 1878–1945. Windsor: World Ship Society. ISBN 978-0-9543310-8-5.
- Rowson, Shabtai. American Jewish Year Book. Philadelphia: Jewish Publication Society.
