= John Purroy Mitchel (fireboat) =

History

New York City Fire Department
- Name: John Purroy Mitchel
- Owner: New York City
- Operator: New York City Fire Department
- Builder: Standard Shipbuilding Corporation
- Cost: $200,000
- In service: 1921
- Out of service: 1962 or later.

General characteristics
- Class & type: fireboat

John Purroy Mitchel was a New York City Fire Department fireboat. She was named after former mayor of New York City John Purroy Mitchel. Grace Drennan, niece of Fire Commissioner Thomas J. Drennan, played a ceremonial role in the boat's launch on July 24, 1921. Her launch was also attended by current mayor John Francis Hylan.

John Purroy Mitchel was the city's first fireboat powered by fuel-oil, not coal. She was 132 feet (40 m) long, and her pumps could throw 9,000 gallons per minute, at pressure of 300 pounds per square inch. One of her water cannons was mounted on top of a 26 feet (7.9 m) tower.

Standard Shipbuilding Corporation of Shooter's Island built John Purroy Mitchel. She was budgeted at $220,000 but was completed under budget at $200,000.

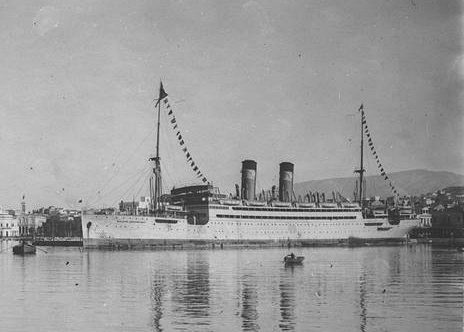
John Purroy Mitchel helped William J. Gaynor fight a cargo fire aboard the ocean liner Byron in 1926

On October 5, 1926, the crew of the ocean liner Byron discovered a fire in one of her cargo holds. John Purroy Mitchel assisted William J. Gaynor, which was the first fireboat on scene. The two fireboats pumped water into the burning hold, and Byron reached the quarantine station under her own power.

At 02:00 hrs on July 5, 1927, a fire was discovered among cotton bales in the number 6 cargo hold of RMS Ebro as she approached New York. She docked in the North River just before 10:00 hrs, disambarked her passengers, and then John Purroy Mitchel and Thomas Willett fought the fire. It was extinguished by 14:00 hrs.

The boat was still in service in 1962, when the John H. Glenn Jr. joined the fleet.
