= SS Byron =

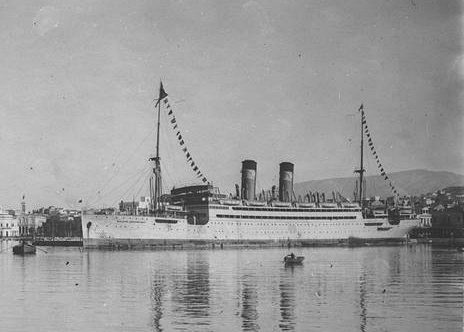
- Vasilefs Constantinos in Piraeus in 1917

History
- Name: 1914: Vasilefs Constantinos; 1919: Megali Hellas; 1924: Byron
- Namesake: 1914: Constantine I of Greece; 1919: Magna Graecia; 1924: Lord Byron
- Owner: 1914: National SN Co of Greece; 1924: Byron SS Co; 1928: National SN Co of Greece
- Operator: 1918: French Government; 1919: Embiricos Brothers
- Port of registry: 1914: (Greece) Andros; 1924: (United Kingdom) London; 1928: (Greece) Andros
- Route: 1915–16, 1921–23: Piraeus – Patras – Naples – Jersey City; 1923: Constanța – Istanbul – Piraeus – Patras – Marseille – New York; 1935: Piraeus – Lisbon – New York
- Builder: Cammell, Laird & Co, Birkenhead
- Yard number: 800
- Launched: 9 June 1914
- Completed: December 1914
- Maiden voyage: 13 May 1915
- Identification: 1914: code letters HQLG; 1918: call sign SVV; 1924: UK official number 147667; code letters KQTP; 1928: code letters JGPH; 1934: call sign SVAG
- Fate: Scrapped 1937

General characteristics
- Type: Ocean liner
- Tonnage: 9,272 GRT, 4,869 NRT
- Length: 470.0 ft (143.3 m)
- Beam: 58.1 ft (17.7 m)
- Draught: 24 ft 2 in (7.4 m)
- Depth: 32.7 ft (10.0 m)
- Decks: 2
- Installed power: 1,759 NHP
- Propulsion: 2 × screws; 2 × quadruple expansion engines
- Speed: 15 1/2 knots (28.7 km/h)
- Capacity: passengers: 60 1st, 450 2nd & 1,800 3rd class; cargo: 4,000 tons
- Crew: 300

SS Byron was a transatlantic ocean liner that was built in England in 1914 and scrapped in Italy in 1937. She was launched as Vasilefs Constantinos, named after Constantine I of Greece. In 1919 she was renamed Megali Hellas, the Greek name for the Ancient Greek settlements in Sicily and southern Italy. In 1923 she was renamed Byron, in recognition of the role of Lord Byron (1788–1824) in the Greek War of Independence (1821–29).

Throughout her career the ship was owned by the National Steam Navigation Company, Ltd, of Greece. However, France requisitioned her as a troop ship in 1918, and her Greek owners registered her in the United Kingdom from 1923 until 1928.

The ship was small compared with the great transatlantic liners of her era. But even in the 1930s she was the largest ship in the Greek merchant fleet.

== Building ==
Cammell, Laird & Co built Vasilefs Constantinos in Birkenhead on the River Mersey as yard number 800. She was launched on 9 June 1914 and completed that December. Her registered length was 470.0 ft (143.3 m), her beam was 58.1 ft (17.7 m) and her depth was 32.7 ft (10.0 m).

Vasilefs Constantinos had berths for 60 First Class, 450 Second Class and 1,800 Third Class passengers, and had a crew of 300. Her holds had capacity for 4,000 tons of cargo. As built, her tonnages were 9,272 GRT and 4,869 NRT.

Vasilefs Constantinos had twin screws, each powered by a quadruple expansion engine. The combined power of her twin engines was rated at 1,759 NHP, and gave her a speed of 15 1/2 knots (28.7 km/h).

The National Steam Navigation Company registered Vasilefs Constantinos on the Aegean island of Andros. Her code letters were HQLG.

== Vasilefs Constantinos ==
On 13 May 1915 Vasilefs Constantinos left Piraeus on her maiden voyage, which was via Patras and Naples to New York. On the afternoon of 28 May US authorities held her for four hours at a quarantine station outside New York because she had a case of suspected typhus aboard. She was allowed to dock at Jersey City later that evening, but passengers were not allowed to disembark until 29 May because United States Customs Service officers were not in position until then.

Greece was neutral in early part of the First World War. Then in September 1915 the Bulgarian Army mobilised against Serbia, and Greece responded by mobilising the Hellenic Army. Thousands of Hellenic Army reservists living in the USA sought to travel to Greece to join the mobilisation. On 12 October Vasilefs Constantinos left Jersey City carrying 2,637 passengers, most of whom were Greek reservists. Her steerage was so crowded that her cargo was limited to 1,000 tons instead of her usual 4,000.

Within hours of leaving port the ship was recalled, reportedly over a dispute between the Greek government and her managers as to how much the government would pay the company for the reservists' passage to Greece. She anchored at the quarantine station until 16 October, when she finally departed eastward across the Atlantic.

On 6 August 1916 Vasilefs Constantinos reached Jersey City carrying 1,991 passengers, most of whom were immigrants from Greece or refugees from the Central Powers' invasion and occupation of Serbia. On 9 September she left Piraeus on her eleventh return trip to Jersey City. After this voyage, her transatlantic service seems to have been interrupted.

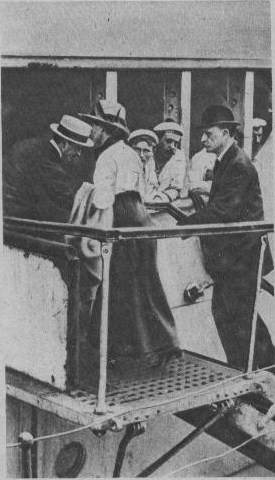
Former Prime Minister of Greece Dimitrios Gounaris boarding Vasilefs Constantinos in 1917, en route to exile on Corsica

By 1918 Vasilefs Constantinos was equipped for wireless telegraphy. Her call sign was SVV.

In 1918 France requisitioned Vasilefs Constantinos as a troop ship. In 1919 she was returned to her owners.

== Megali Hellas ==
In 1919 the ship was renamed Megali Hellas, which is the Greek name for Magna Graecia in Sicily and southern Italy.

On 3 March 1921 the ship ran aground off Kumkale, at the mouth of the Dardanelles. She was refloated in 8 March.

One source states that Megali Hellas resumed service on her route between Piraeus and New York via Patras and Naples on 12 October 1919. However, on 30 May 1921 The New York Times welcomed the return of the ship to New York the previous day "after an absence of seven years". Her passengers on that 1921 voyage included 200 picture brides.

On 29 July 1921, US authorities detained Megali Hellas off Sandy Hook, New Jersey because Greece had used up its immigration quota for that month under the Emergency Quota Act. She was not allowed into port until 1 August.

On 1 October 1921 Megali Hellas reached New York carrying 715 passengers, including 200 Greek brides-to-be who had traveled to marry men in the USA. US immigration authorities allowed no-one to disembark except holders of US or diplomatic passports. The authorities ruled that all 378 steerage passengers would be taken to Ellis Island, held there and deported.

== Byron ==
In 1923 the National Steam Navigation Company founded a UK subsidiary, the Byron Steam Ship Company. In 1924 it transferred Megali Hellas to the new company, renamed her Byron, and changed her port of registration to London. Her UK official number was 147667 and her UK code letters were KQTP.

On 12 January 1923 Byron started serving a revised route between Istanbul and New York via Piraeus, Patras and Marseille. From 4 August 1923 this route was extended to Constanța in Romania.

=== Cargo fire ===
On 5 October 1926 Byron was approaching New York, carrying 697 passengers from Europe. At about 0500 hrs, about 8 nautical miles (15 km) off Ambrose Channel, a fire was discovered in one of her cargo holds. Her crew fought the fire, but it soon disabled her steam-powered steering gear, so she had to be steered by hand.

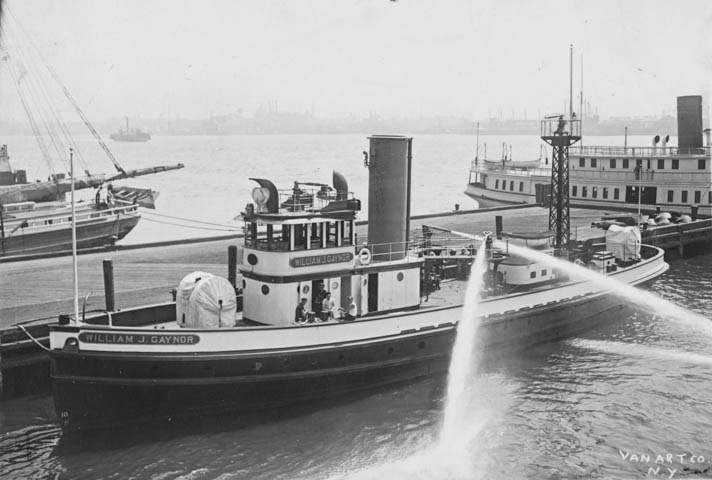
William J. Gaynor, the first fireboat to assist Byron with her cargo hold fire

At about 0600 Byron she embarked a pilot as normal to take her into port. Her wireless telegraphist sent a distress signal, requesting tugboats and fireboats to assist her.

The naval wireless station at The Battery received Byron's signal. The fireboat William J. Gaynor came alongside, and was joined by John Purroy Mitchel. The pair pumped water into the burning hold. Byron's boilers and engines continued to work, and she reached the quarantine station under her own power, assisted by two tugs.

=== Final years ===
In 1928 Byron returned to the direct ownership of the National Steam Navigation Company, which changed her port of registration back to Andros. Her new Greek code letters were to JGPH. By 1934 her call sign was SVAG.

On 2 October 1935 Byron left Piraeus on what turned out to be her final voyage to New York. She called at Lisbon on her outward journey, and Boston, the Azores and Lisbon on her return. The Greek government then withdrew her subsidy, and the National Steam Navigation Company went bankrupt.

On 20 February 1937 Byron left Piraeus for the last time. She sailed to La Spezia in northern Italy, where she was scrapped.

== Bibliography ==
- Bonsor, NRP (1979). North Atlantic Seaway. Vol. 3. Jersey: Brookside Publications. p. 1,416. ISBN 978-0905824024.
- Harnack, Edwin P (1930) [1903]. All About Ships & Shipping (4th ed.). London: Faber and Faber.
- Lloyd's Register of Shipping. Vol. I–Steamers. London: Lloyd's Register of Shipping. 1915. VAR–VAU – via Internet Archive.
- Lloyd's Register of Shipping. Vol. II–Steamers and Motorships. London: Lloyd's Register of Shipping. 1925. BUT–BYZ – via Internet Archive.
- Lloyd's Register of Shipping. Vol. II–Steamers and Motorships. London: Lloyd's Register of Shipping. 1928. BUT–BYZ – via Internet Archive.
- Lloyd's Register of Shipping. Vol. II Steamers and Motorships of 300 Tons Gross and Over. London: Lloyd's Register of Shipping. 1936. BUS–BYR – via Internet Archive.
- The Marconi Press Agency Ltd (1918). The Year Book of Wireless Telegraphy and Telephony. London: The Wireless Press, Ltd.
- Mercantile Navy List. 1925. p. 77 – via Crew List Index Project.
- Talbot-Booth, EC (1936). Ships and the Sea (Third ed.). London: Sampson Low, Marston & Co Ltd.
