= Thomas Willett (fireboat) =

Retired New York City fireboat (1908–59)

Coordinates: 40.711020°N 74.050684°W

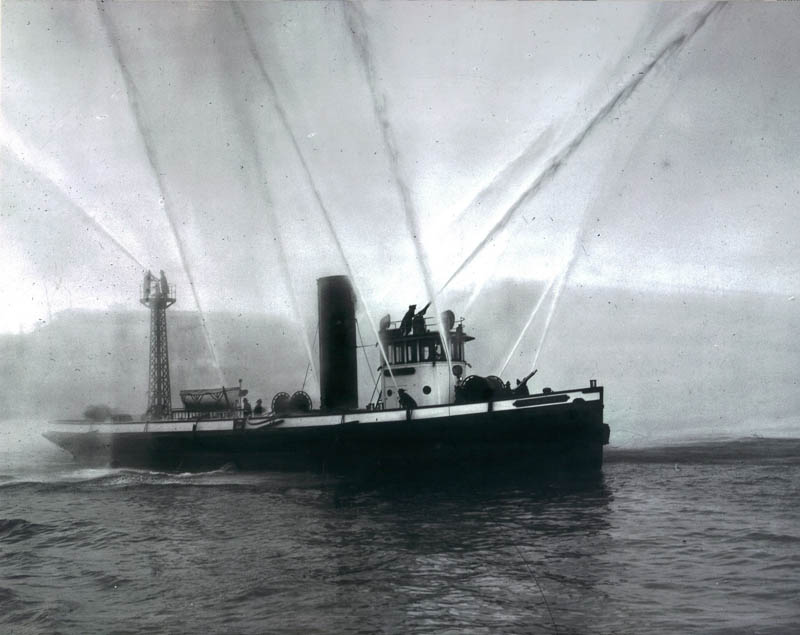
- Thomas Willett celebrating July 4 in 1908

History

New York City Fire Department
- Name: Thomas Willett
- Namesake: Thomas Willett
- Port of registry: New York City, United States
- Builder: T. S. Marvel Shipbuilding, Newburgh, NY
- Yard number: 185
- Completed: 1908
- Out of service: 1959
- Renamed: Engine 86; Engine 78; Marine 5
- Fate: Sold, converted to passenger vessel by Circle Line

United States
- Name: Circle Line XIV
- Owner: Circle Line Sightseeing Cruises
- Acquired: 1959
- Identification: USCG Doc #: 204989
- Status: Floating office in Morris Canal Basin, Jersey City

General characteristics
- Type: Fireboat
- Displacement: 580 net tons
- Length: 123 ft (37 m)
- Beam: 27 ft (8.2 m)
- Draft: 14 ft (4.3 m)
- Speed: 14 knots
- Capacity: 9000 gpm

Thomas Willett was a New York City Fire Department fireboat. Named after Thomas Willett, the first mayor of New York City, she was launched in 1908 and retired in 1959. She was built as a steam-engine powered vessel with coal-fired boilers. She was converted to oil-fired boilers in 1926.

== Operational history ==
At 02:00 hrs on July 5, 1927, a fire was discovered among cotton bales in the number 6 cargo hold of RMS Ebro as she approached New York. She docked in the North River just before 10:00 hrs, disambarked her passengers, and then John Purroy Mitchel and Thomas Willett fought the fire. It was extinguished by 14:00 hrs.

On August 14, 1927, a tugboat of the New York, New Haven and Hartford Railroad, towing two barges of railway rolling stock, collided with a train of rock barges towed by Henry F. Wills. Thomas Willett responded, when one barge was sunk and others damaged, saving their crew.

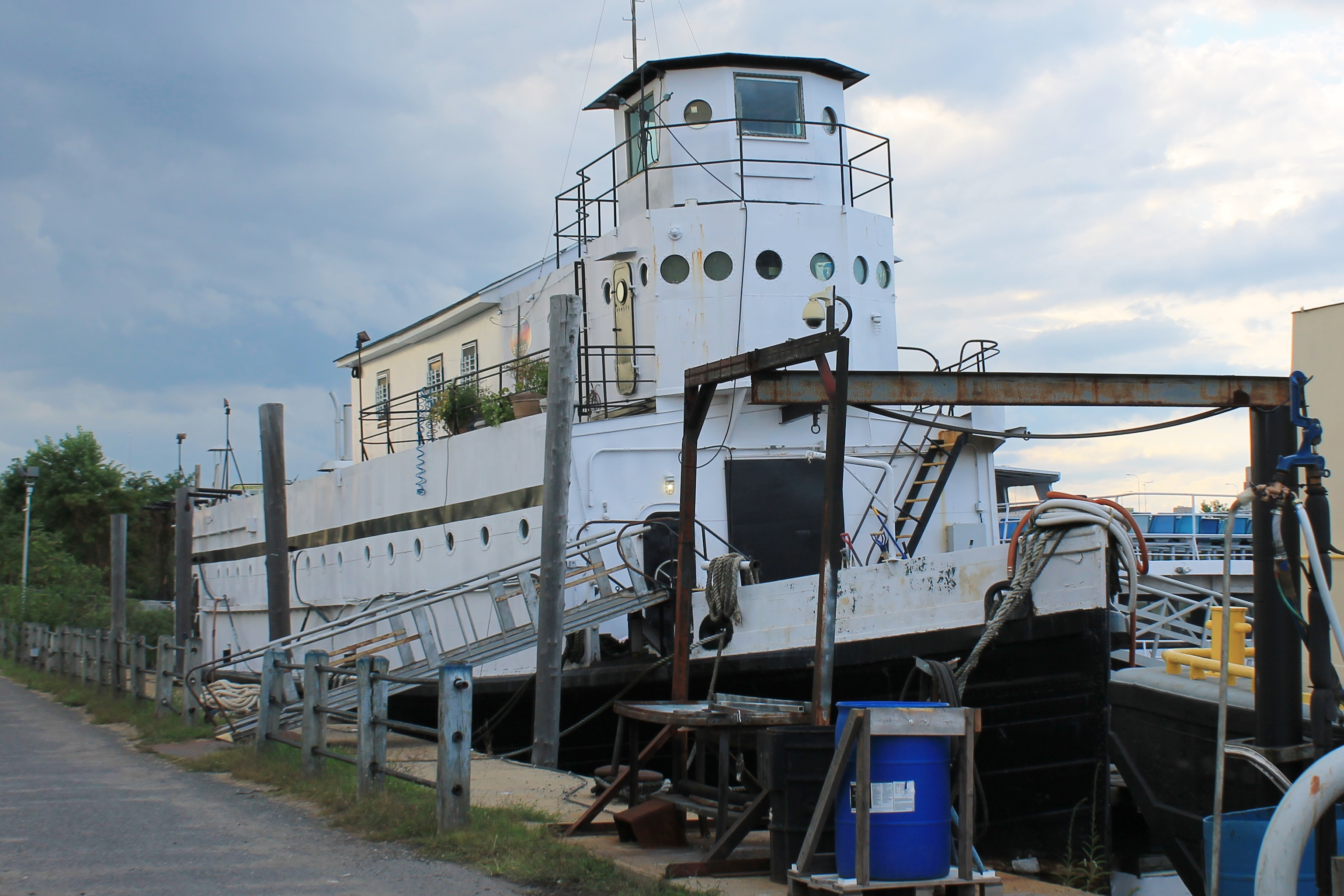
Circle Line XIV seen in September 2019.

The FDNY retired Thomas Willett in 1959 and put her up for public sale. She was acquired by Circle Line Sightseeing Cruises, who converted her into a tour boat and renamed her Circle Line XIV. As of 2021 she survives in Morris Canal Basin, Jersey City, as a floating office for Statue Cruises.

== See also ==
- James Duane, a sister fireboat also named after a former New York City mayor
