= James Duane (fireboat) =

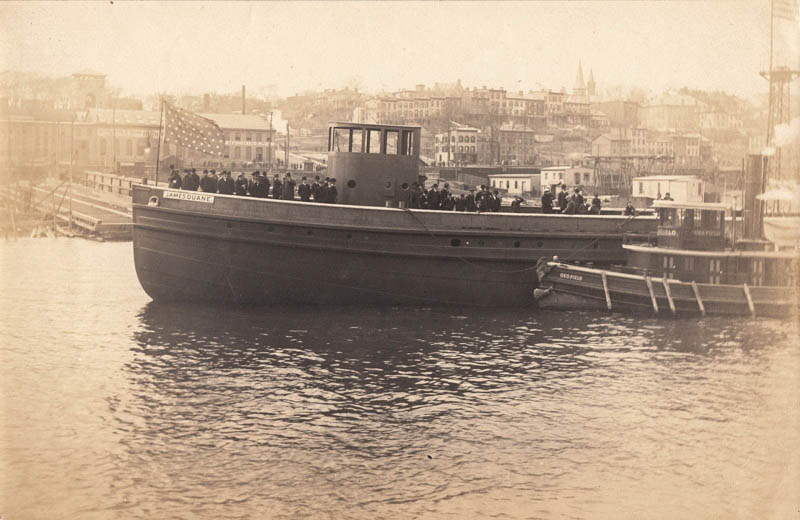
Launch of the James Duane.

The James Duane was a fireboat operated by the Fire Department of New York from 1908 to 1959.

The James Duane and her sister ship the Thomas Willett were wooden hulled steam-powered vessels. They could proceed at 14 knots (16 mph). Their pumps could discharge 9,000 gallons per minute. One of their water cannons was mounted on a tower.

The James Duane was named after the 44th mayor of New York City, James Duane.

== See also ==
- Fireboats of New York City
