= SS Statendam (1924) =

Steam turbine ocean liner of the Holland America Line

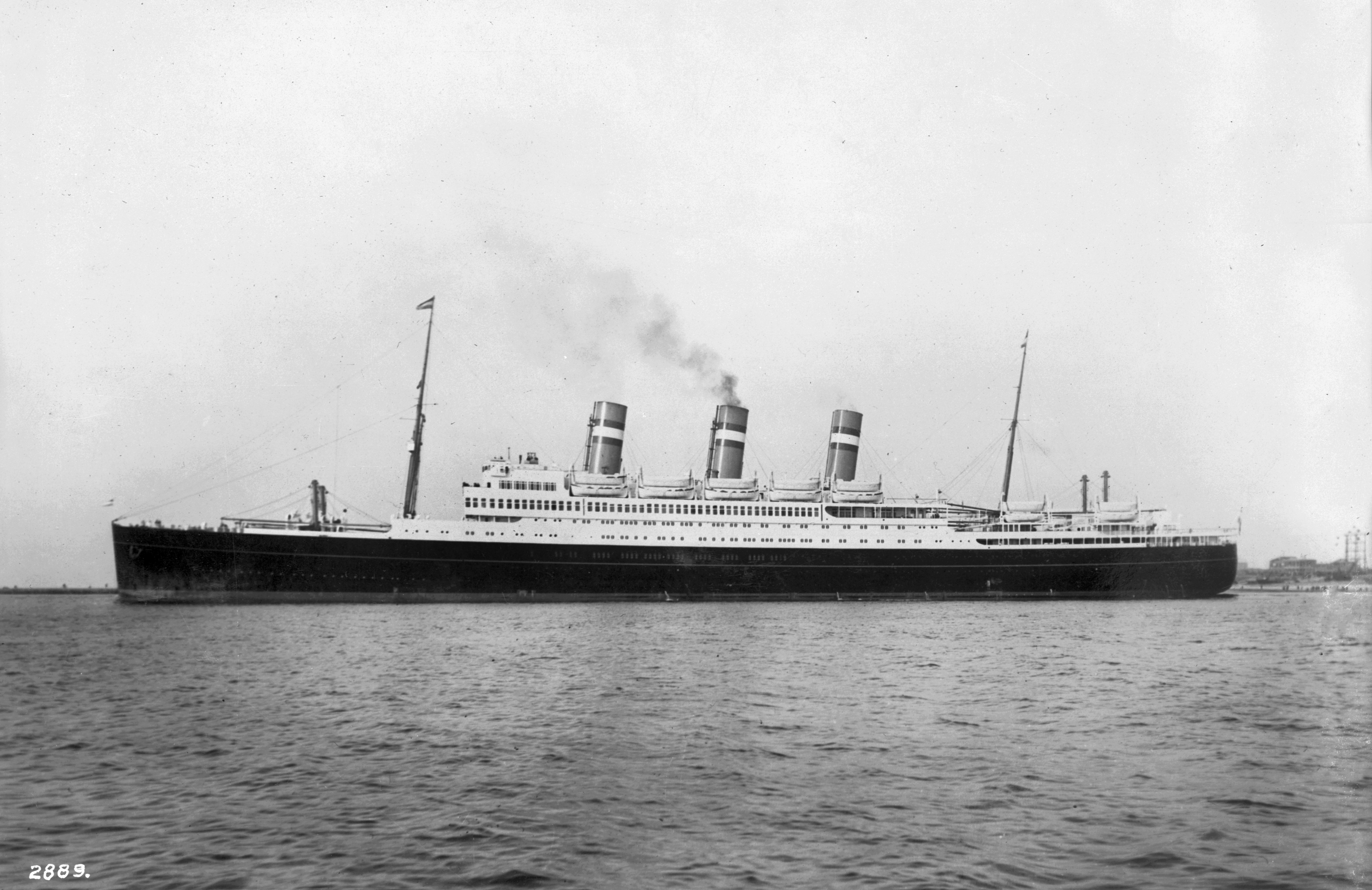
- Statendam during her sea trials on 3 April 1929

History

Netherlands
- Name: Statendam
- Owner: Maildienst der Holland Amerika Lijn
- Operator: Holland America Line
- Port of registry: Rotterdam
- Route: Rotterdam – Hoboken
- Builder: 1921–24: Harland & Wolff, Belfast; 1927–29: Wilton's, Schiedam
- Yard number: 612
- Laid down: 11 August 1921
- Launched: 11 September 1924
- Completed: 3 April 1929
- Maiden voyage: 11 April 1929
- Out of service: Laid up, 9 December 1939
- Refit: 1933
- Identification: Code letters PTBN (until 1933); Call sign PHSN (by 1934)
- Fate: Burnt out May 1940; Scrapped August 1940

General characteristics
- Type: Ocean liner
- Tonnage: 16,969 DWT; 1929: 29,511 GRT, 17,749 NRT; 1933: 28,921 GRT, 16,920 NRT
- Length: 696.8 ft (212.37 m) overall; 670.4 ft (204.3 m) registered
- Beam: 81.4 ft (24.8 m)
- Draught: 33 ft 3 1/2 in (10.15 m)
- Depth: 49.4 ft (15.1 m)
- Decks: 4
- Installed power: 4,644 NHP, 19,500 shp
- Propulsion: 6 × Steam turbines; Single reduction gearing; 2 × Propellers
- Speed: 19 knots (35 km/h)
- Capacity: passengers: 150 × 1st class, 344 × 2nd class, 800 × 3rd class; cargo: 580,620 cu ft (16,441 m^{3}) grain; 540,723 cu ft (15,311.6 m^{3}) bale; 28,230 cu ft (799 m^{3}) refrigerated
- Crew: 300
- Sensors & processing systems: by 1931: Submarine signalling, Wireless direction finding; by 1934: Gyrocompass

SS Statendam was a steam turbine transatlantic liner. She was the third of five Holland America Line ("Nederlandsch-Amerikaansche Stoomvaart Maatschappij" or NASM) ships to be called Statendam. She was built to replace the second Statendam, which the UK Government had requisitioned as a troop ship in 1915, and which had been sunk in 1918.

The new Statendam's building was unusually protracted. Her keel was laid in Ireland in 1921, but she was not launched until 1924. Further delays in her building led NASM to have her towed to be completed in the Netherlands.

Statendam was economical to run, and survived the shipping slump caused by the Great Depression. She was the largest ship in NASM's fleet, and in the merchant fleet of the Netherlands, until the second Nieuw Amsterdam was completed in 1938.

From late April to late December each year she ran scheduled services between Rotterdam and Hoboken via Boulogne, Southampton and Plymouth. From late December to late April most years she went cruising, usually to the Caribbean. In early 1934 she made one cruise from New York to the Mediterranean.

After the Second World War began in September 1939, Statendam's westbound Atlantic crossings carried thousands of US and European refugees. From December 1939 she was laid up in Rotterdam. During the German invasion of the Netherlands in May 1940 she was burnt out, and that August her hulk was scrapped.

== Building at Belfast ==
Harland & Wolff built Statendam in Belfast as yard number 612. Her keel was laid on 11 August 1921 on slipway 14 in H&W's East Yard. This was three months after the 67th United States Congress had passed the Emergency Quota Act, which limited immigration to the USA. Statendam was launched on 11 September 1924, but with no launching ceremony. This was four months after the next Congress passed the Immigration Act of 1924, further reducing immigration. Until the First World War, transatlantic passenger shipping companies had carried large numbers of emigrants to the US, mostly in Third Class or steerage accommodation. The new acts greatly reduced migration to the US, so NASM had H&W revise Statendam's design to reduce the amount of lower-class accommodation she would have.

Her predecessor Justicia had "combination machinery": three screws; two driven by triple expansion steam engines, and one driven by an exhaust steam turbine. This elaborate system was obsolescent even when Justicia was completed in 1917. Hence for the new Statendam, NASM chose purely turbine propulsion with only two screws, which the turbines drove via single reduction gearing. This was simpler, lighter and more compact than Justicia's machinery, and proved very economical. The combined power of Statendam's turbines was rated at 4,644 NHP or 19,500 shp, and gave her a speed of 19 knots (35 km/h).

== Completion at Schiedam ==
Shortly after Statendam was launched in 1924, work on her stopped for almost three years, because NASM lacked the funds to complete her. In 1927 the Dutch government gave NASM a state loan to get her completed. On 13 April the L Smit & Co tugs Poolzee, Oostzee, Roode Zee, and Seine towed Statendam out of Belfast. On 20 April they reached Schiedam in South Holland, where Wilton's Machinefabriek en Scheepswerf took over building her. She was completed on 3 April 1929.

Statendam's lengths were 696.8 ft (212.37 m) overall and 670.4 ft (204.3 m) registered. Her beam was 81.4 ft (24.8 m) and her depth was 49.4 ft (15.1 m). Her tonnages were 29,511 GRT, 17,749 NRT and 16,969 DWT. She had berths for 150 passengers in first class, 344 in second class and 800 in third class. Her holds had capacity for 580,620 cubic feet (16,441 m^{3}) of grain, or 540,723 cubic feet (15,311.6 m^{3}) of baled cargo. 28,230 cubic feet (799 m^{3}) of her holds were refrigerated. Her crew had 300 members.

Statendam was smaller than Justicia, but larger than Rotterdam, which had been NASM's flagship and largest liner since 1908. Statendam took over as NASM's flagship, and was also the largest ship in the Dutch merchant fleet until the second Nieuw Amsterdam was completed in 1938.

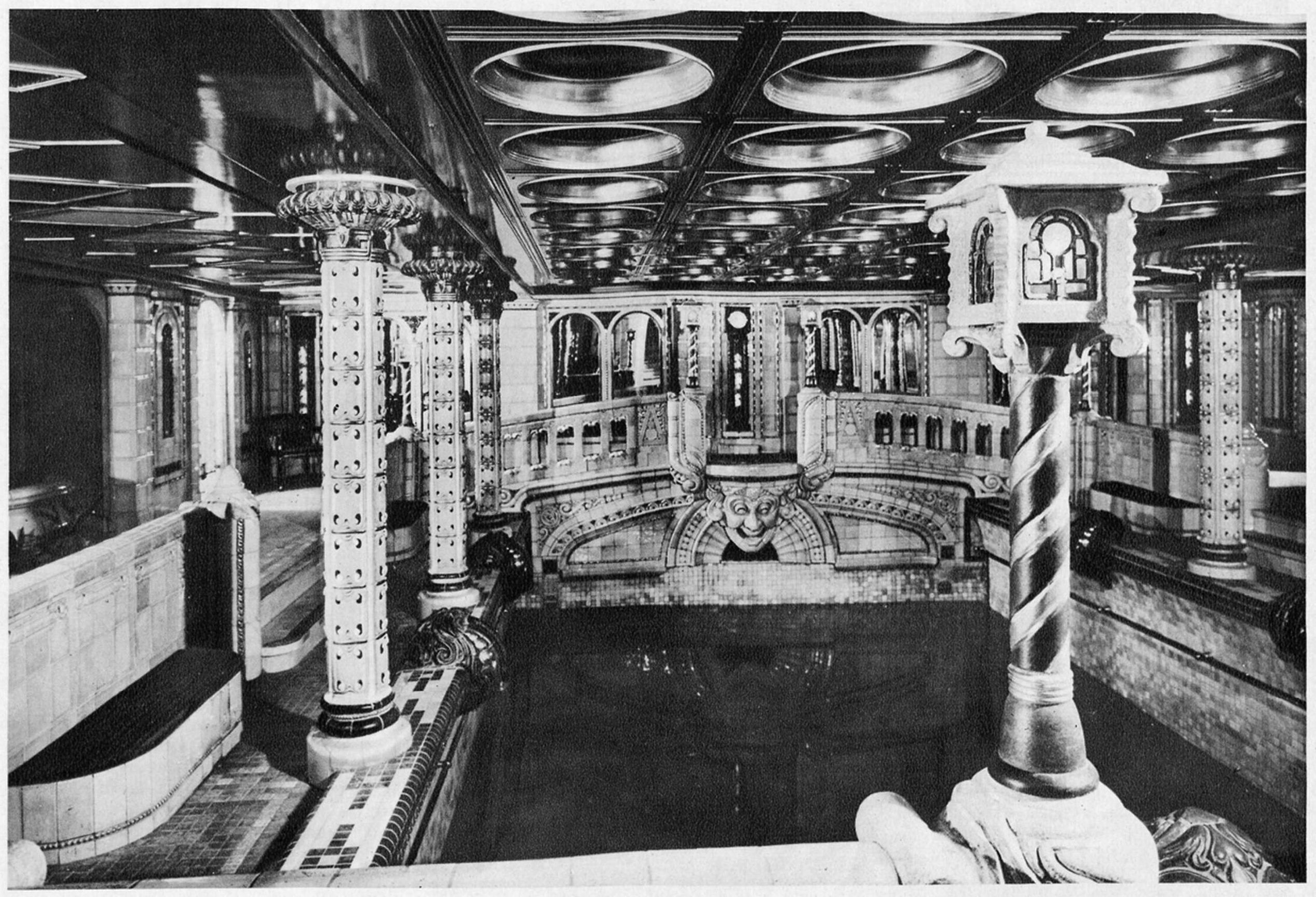
Indoor swimming pool aboard Statendam

NASM's president, Ripperda Wierdsma, stated "We do not wish to compete for the Blue Riband of the Atlantic, but we do intend to excel in comfort, cleansiness and cuisine". Statendam's public rooms included a palm court on the bow deck below her pilot bridge, giving passengers a view of the sea to both sides and forward over the bow. She had a walnut-panelled library on her promenade deck. She had a lounge aft, and an orchestra whose concerts in the lounge were relayed around the ship by loudspeakers. Other public rooms included a veranda café and an "American bar".

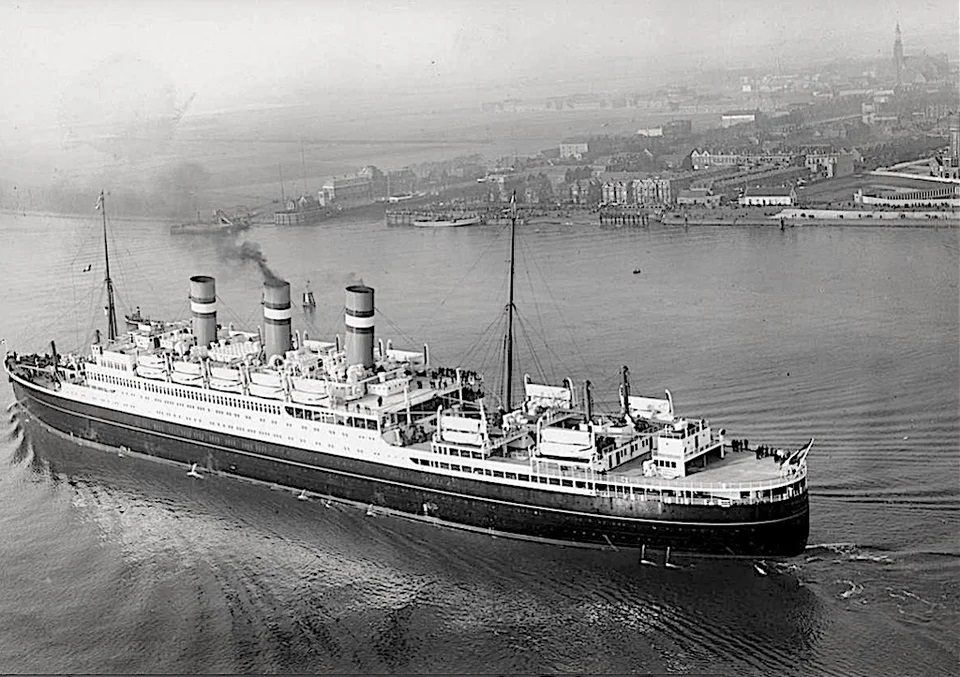
Aerial view of Statendam during her sea trials

For her sea trials on 3 April 1929, Statendam carried more than 300 guests, including Prince Hendrik the Prince Consort, members of the Cabinet of the Netherlands, and the Mayor of Rotterdam.

NASM created a subsidiary company, Maildienst der Holland Amerika Lijn, to own Statendam. Its registered capital was 40 million Dutch guilders. She was registered at Rotterdam. Her code letters were PTBN.

== Transatlantic service and winter cruises ==
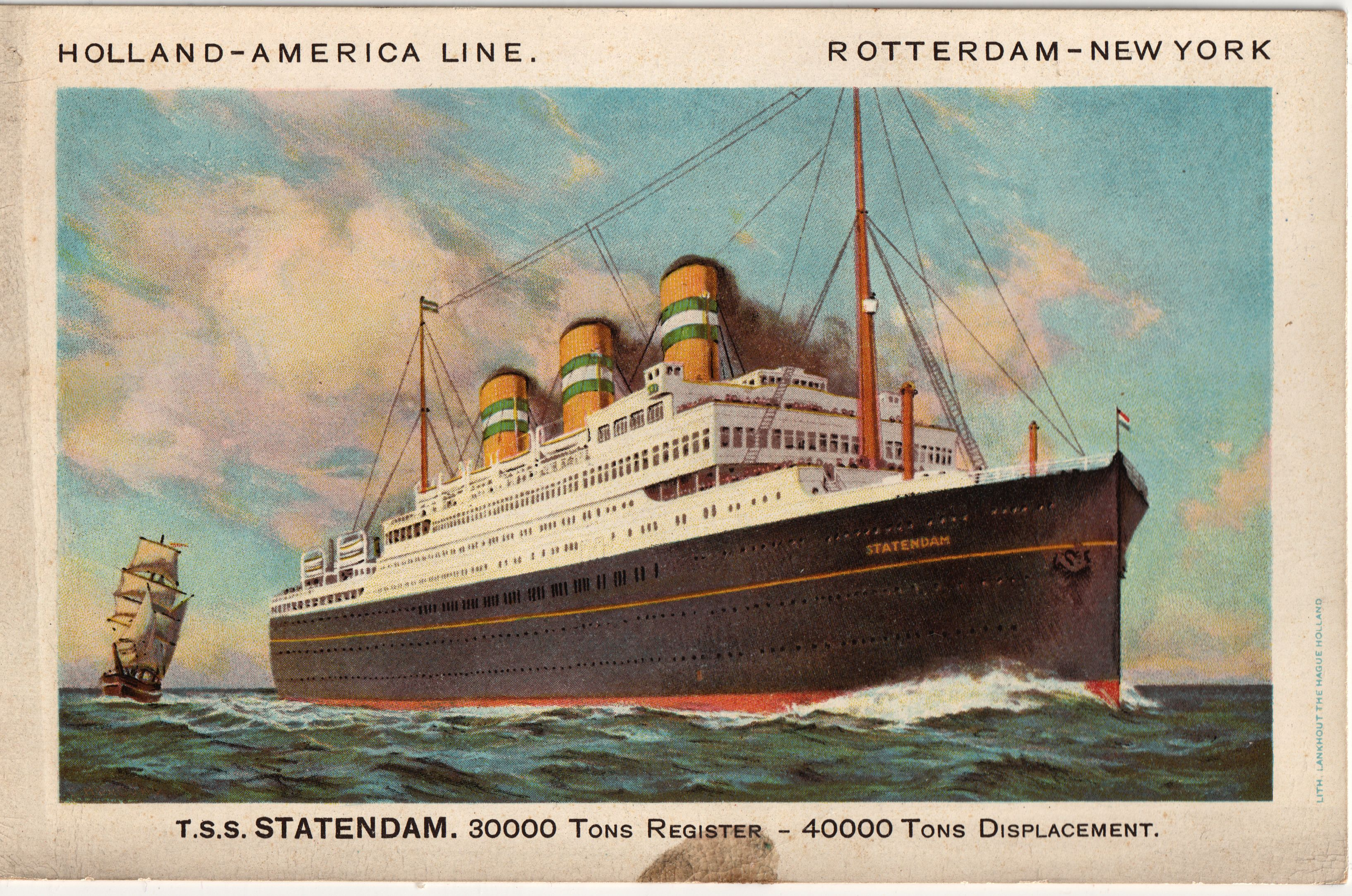
TSS Statendam with the Holland-America Line

On 11 April 1929 Statendam left Rotterdam on her maiden voyage to New York. She arrived in New York on 19 April to a traditional welcome of fireboats making a display with jets of water. She docked at Fifth Street dock in Hoboken. On 22 April, a team of NYPD police motorcycles escorted Statendam's officers, and NASM personnel including the Rypperda Wierdsma, to New York City Hall to be received by Mayor Jimmy Walker. That evening the ship hosted a gala reception for 500 guests. The politician William C. Redfield as toastmaster. Speakers included the Dutch Ambassador JH van Royen, aircraft maker Anthony Fokker, New York police chief Grover Whalen, and retired justice George Landon Ingraham.

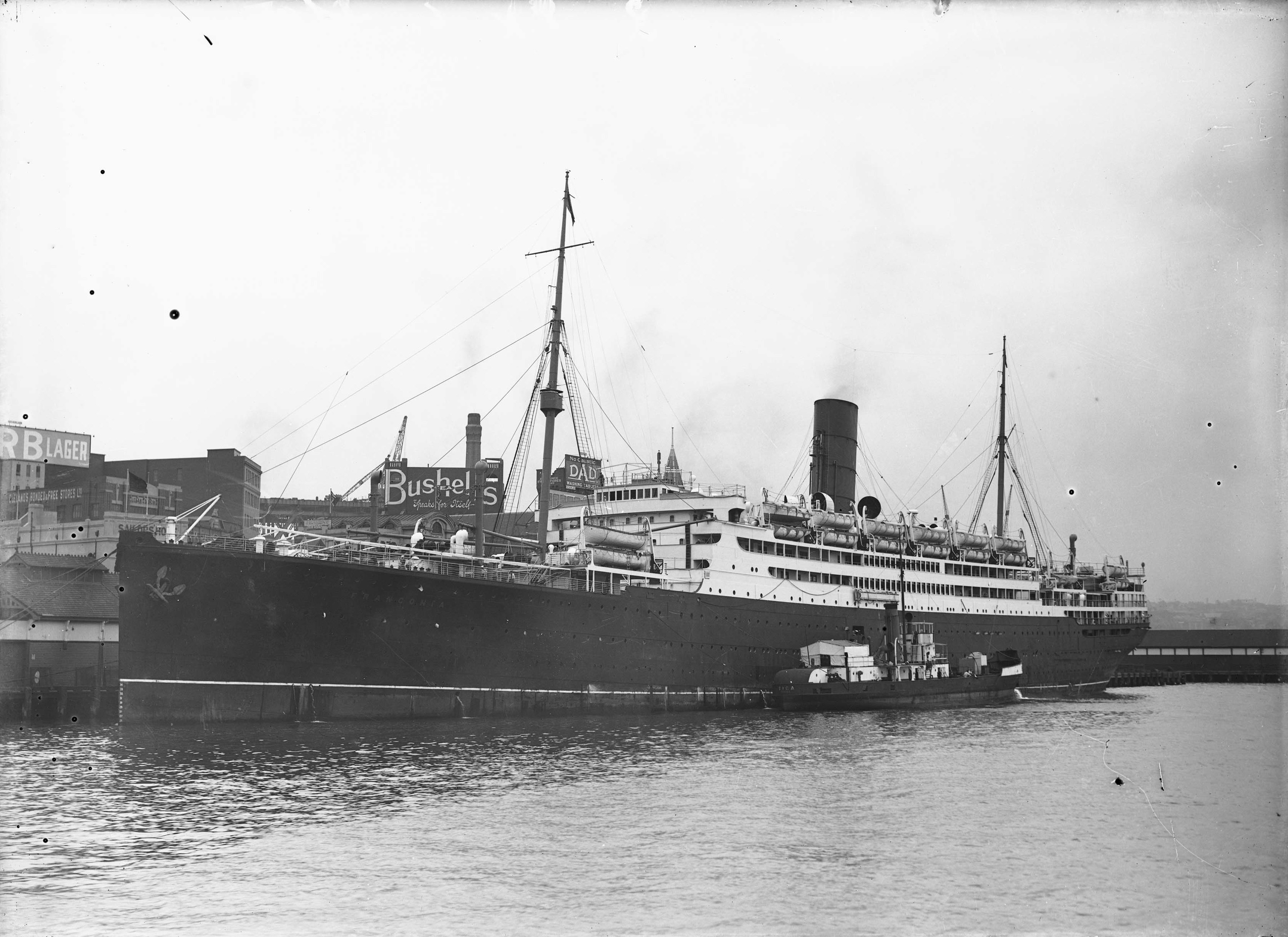
RMS Franconia, with which Statendam had a minor collision in Havana on 1 January 1930

Transatlantic passenger traffic was seasonal, and was less in winter, so in most winters, Statendam cruised from New York to the Caribbean. She began her first Caribbean cruise from New York on 21 December 1929. On 1 January 1930, while being warped at Havana, she struck the Cunard Liner RMS Franconia, crushing the port end of the latter's flying bridge, and breaking off several feet of her rail. Statendam suffered several broken windows in her superstructure. Statendam completed her 16-day cruise, and returned to New York on 7 January.

The Great Depression that began in 1929 brought a global slump in commercial shipping. On 24 December 1930, NASM revised its fares for 1931. Fares were seasonal, and until 1930 the company had divided them into summer, winter, and intermediate. For 1931, NASM abolished the intermediate seasons, simplified the fares to summer and winter only, and announced significant reductions. On Statendam, the minimum first class fare eastbound would be US$222.50 from August to April, and westbound would be $200 from November to July. The minimum first class fare would be $122.50 for summer and $165 for winter. Most minimum second class cabin rates were unchanged, except for winter round-trip tickets. These were reduced to $255 between Hoboken and Plymouth or Southampton, and to $264 between Hoboken and Boulogne or Rotterdam.

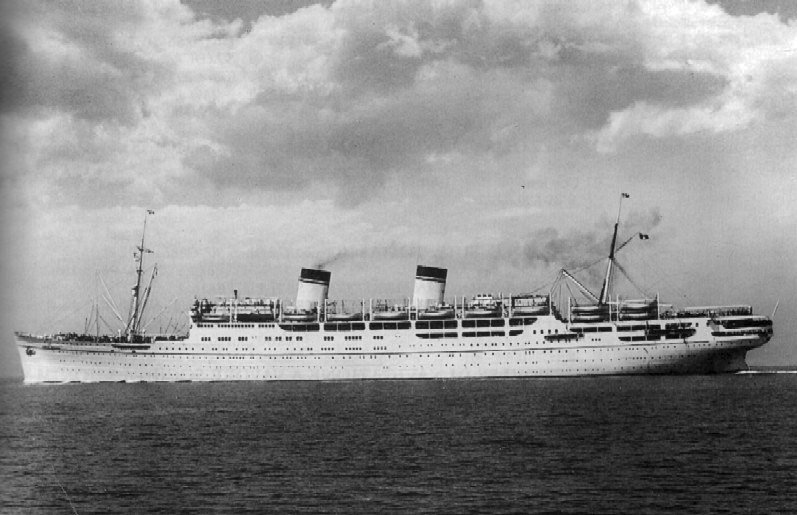
Conte Grande, with which Statendam had a minor collision in Havana on 1 January 1931

On 1 January 1931, Statendam again collided with a liner in Havana harbour. A heavy sea pushed her against the starboard side of the Italian liner Conte Grande, damaging several plates of the latter's hull. Statendam completed at least three Caribbean cruises that winter. The third started from New York on 29 January, and was scheduled to take 25 days. Destinations included the Virgin Islands, Martinique, Barbados and Trinidad, a steamboat excursion up the Orinoco to Ciudad Bolívar, and a visit to Nassau, Bahamas. That winter she ran cruises for a total of four months.

By 1931, Statendam was equipped with submarine signalling and wireless direction finding. On 12 April that year she ran aground on a mudbank at the entrance of Southampton Water. She was refloated after 47 hours, with the aid of six tugs. NASM reclassified her second class accommodation as "tourist class" from 10 October. At Hoboken on 6 November was towed away from the Fifth Street terminal and out into the middle of the Hudson River, as fire destroyed a nearby trainshed and 25 freight cars of the Hoboken Manufacturers' Railroad. Flames rose 50 feet (15 m) high at times. Before Statendam was towed clear, her crew fought to extinguish embers that fell on her foremast and rigging.

In the winter of 1931–32, Statendam made four Caribbean cruises. The first was for 16 days, left New York on 19 December, and included calls at Nassau, Port-au-Prince, Colón, Panama, Kingston, Jamaica and Havana. It was followed by one cruise of 17 days and two of 26 days. For the first cruise, Statendam took with her a company of eight actors to perform six plays to her 300 passengers. A temporary stage had been erected to turn her veranda café into a theatre.

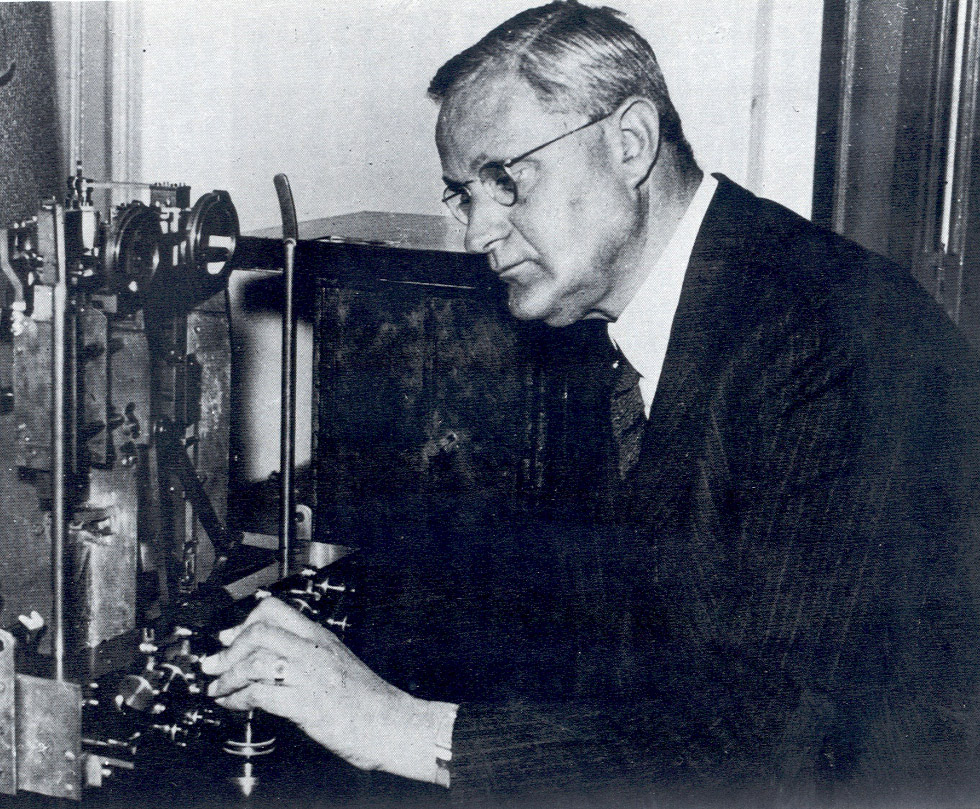
Dr Vening Meinesz with a gravimeter

On 23 April 1932 Statendam left Hoboken on a transatlantic crossing to Rotterdam. Her passengers included the geophysicist Dr Vening Meinesz, who had recently completed the "Navy-Princeton gravity expedition to the West Indies" in the submarine USS S-48. A cabin aboard Statendam was fitted out with a gravimeter, for Dr Meinesz to take gravity measurements during his voyage to Rotterdam.

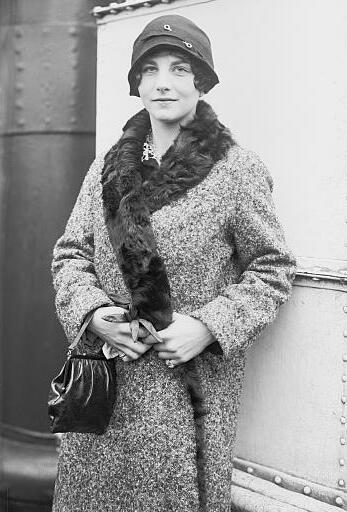
Helen Wills Moody

On 19 May 1932 the tennis star Helen Wills Moody left Hoboken on Statendam on her way to play in the 1932 Wimbledon Championships. On 12 August, a Czechoslovak ballet company led by the Russian-born Yelizaveta Nikolská, accompanied by Statendam's orchestra, danced on the sun deck as the ship entered New York harbor.

Statendam's passenger accommodation and public rooms were elegant but dated, so in 1933 she was refitted. This reduced her tonnages to 28,921 GRT and 16,920 NRT. By 1934 the ship's navigation equipment included a gyrocompass, and the call sign PHSN had superseded her code letters.

Statendam's cruises in the winter of 1933–34 included a 15-day voyage to the West Indies and Caribbean ports in South America that left Hoboken on 23 December 1933, another to South America that left New York on 10 January 1934, and another to the Mediterranean that left New York on 9 February. The Mediterranean cruise carried more than 500 passengers, and included a visit to Piraeus in Greece.

On 13 October 1935, Statendam arrived in Hoboken carrying in her specie room £ 948,000 in gold from England and FF 362,000,000 in gold French francs from France: the equivalent of US$ 29 million. The next day the gold was taken from the ship in armoured cars to the Federal Reserve Bank of New York.

In January 1936 NASM reclassified Rotterdam, Volendam and Veendam, as cabin class ships, and announced that Statendam would become cabin class that May, after she completed her cruising season. Her one-way fares would be reduced from $194.50 to $173.50 in the summer season, and from $185.50 to $165.50 in the off-season. NASM was the last major shipping line to adopt cabin class.

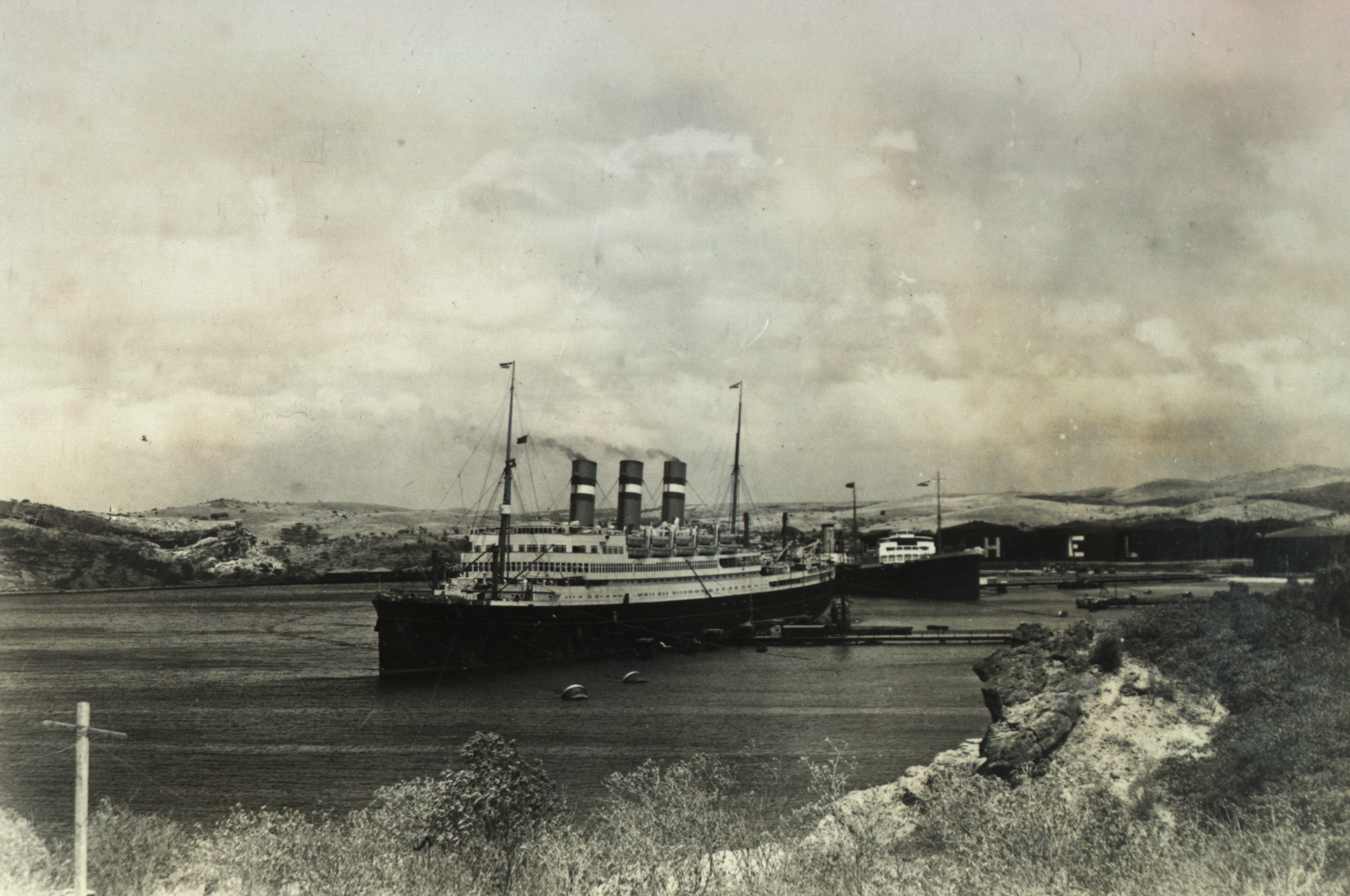
Statendam in Curaçao, date unknown

NASM planned for Statendam to leave from New York on 6 February 1936 to repeat its cruise to the Mediterranean. But shipping companies became concerned at a threat of war in the region. In October 1935, Norddeutscher Lloyd cancelled Columbus' winter cruise to the Mediterranean and replaced it with one to South America. Canadian Pacific made the same decision for RMS Empress of Britain, and switched RMS Empress of Australia's winter cruise plans to the Caribbean. Hamburg America Line revised Reliance's round the World cruise to go via South Africa instead of the Mediterranean. By the end of October, NASM had 110 passengers booked to go on Statendam to the Mediterranean, but on 2 November the company followed its competitors by cancelling the cruise. Instead Statendam announced a series of nine Caribbean cruises, ranging from five to 18 days, starting on 21 December 1935.

on 5 September 1937 Statendam reached Hoboken from Rotterdam carrying 1,517 passengers. This set a record number not only for the ship, but also for any ship arriving at Hoboken since the First World War. On 19 December 1937 Statendam was leaving New York to start a Caribbean cruise when she and the Matson Line refrigerated cargo ship Golden Cloud were involved in a collision. Statendam had left port in good visibility, but just beyond the Ambrose Lightship she ran into fog, and reduced speed to 11 knots (20 km/h). At about 1500 hrs Golden Cloud gave one long blast of her whistle and came into sight through the fog. Statendam's Master, Captain George Barendse, ordered her engines full astern, but Golden Cloud's stern hit Statendam 12 feet (4 m) above the waterline. Neither ship was significantly damaged, and both continued their journeys. Her Caribbean cruises for that season continued until late April 1938.

== Crisis in Europe ==
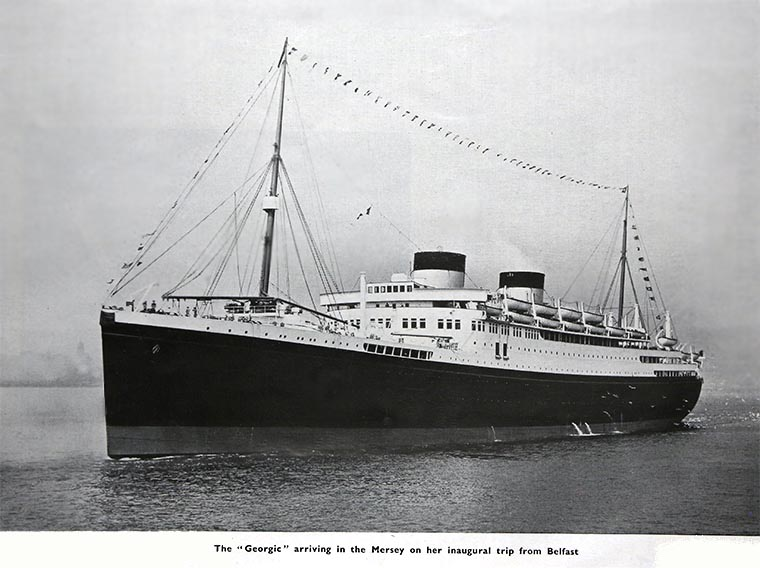
White Star Line's Georgic, which with Statendam and other transatlantic ships carried the capital flight of gold bullion from Europe just before the Munich Agreement

The Sudetenland crisis in September 1938 created a threat of war that prompted capital flight from Europe. The Munich Agreement signed on 30 September temporarily averted a major European war, but by then large amounts of gold were already in transit to North America. On 8 October, United States Lines' George Washington reached New York carrying $37.3 million. On 10 October 1938 three liners arrived carrying bullion. United States Lines' President Roosevelt brought $51 million, which was the largest amount ever carried by a single ship. On the same day, Statendam and White Star Line's Georgic arrived carrying $24 million between them.

On 1 September 1939 the Second World War began. NASM had Statendam's hull painted with neutrality markings: "STATENDAM – HOLLAND" painted amidships in large white capital letters, and a large Dutch flag painted either side of her bow. On 5 September she embarked 1,600 passengers at Rotterdam, including 1,200 US citizens. She delayed her departure from midnight that night to 10:00 hrs the next morning, to await another 200 US citizens coming from Paris by train. On 8 September U-48 stopped and sank the British cargo ship Winkleigh in the Western Approaches southwest of Ireland. Statendam, by then heading west, rescued all 37 of Winkleigh's crew.

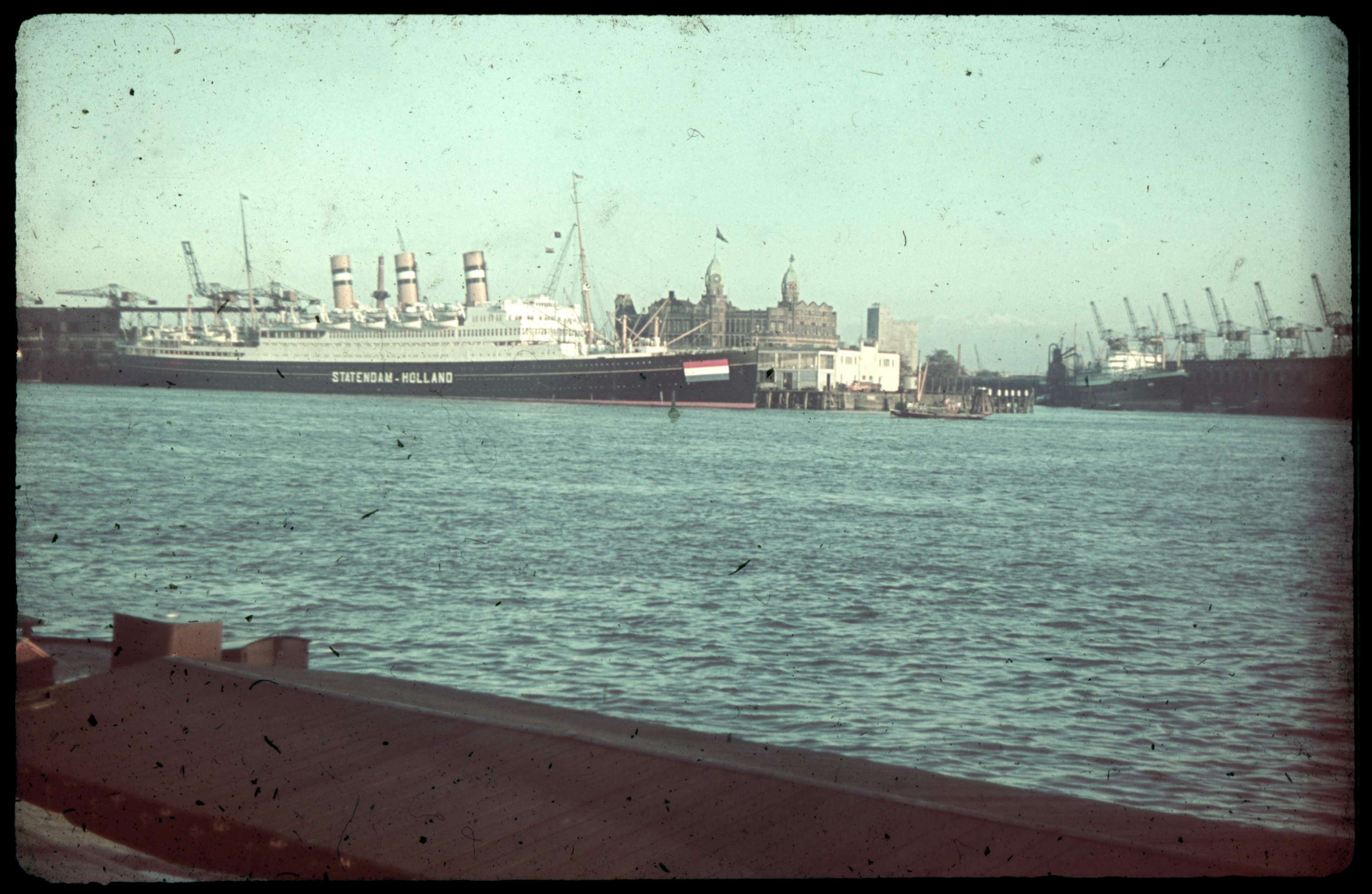
Statendam at her berth in Rotterdam. Her hull painted is with neutrality markings for wartime, so this photograph was taken between September 1939 and May 1940. Centre right, behind her foredeck, is the NASM headquarters building.

On 22 October, Statendam left Rotterdam carrying nearly 1,350 passengers, including US, Polish, Hungarian and Jewish refugees. After calls at ports in the English Channel, she brought a total of 1,534 passengers, including 437 US citizens. She reached Hoboken on 31 October. Among her passengers from Rotterdam was the French conductor Pierre Monteux, en route for his fifth season conducting the San Francisco Symphony.

On 23 November, Statendam left Rotterdam for New York carrying 1,200 passengers. The next day she made a scheduled call at Southampton to pick up passengers. The UK authorities detained her there, and by 27 November she was still in Southampton, with no indication of when she would be allowed to leave port. On 5 December she reached Hoboken with 1,166 passengers, including 800 refugees from Germany and German-annexed territories. Also among her passengers were former Prime Minister of Canada R. B. Bennett, former Director-General of the BBC Sir John Reith, and the dancer Tilly Losch, Countess of Carnarvon.

On 9 December, Statendam left Hoboken for Rotterdam carrying only 110 passengers, including 50 Germans returning home. Also among her passengers was NASM managing director Frans Bouman, who said that because of the war, it was difficult to say what the company's future transatlantic service would be. She was scheduled to leave Rotterdam on 23 December for Hoboken, and then make a series of five cruises to neutral ports, leaving New York on February 2 and 16, and March 1, 15 and 23, 1940. However, NASM delayed her departure from Rotterdam, and on 4 January 1940 it announced that she would be laid up there, because of both the risk of being sunk and the consequent high cost of marine insurance.

== Loss ==
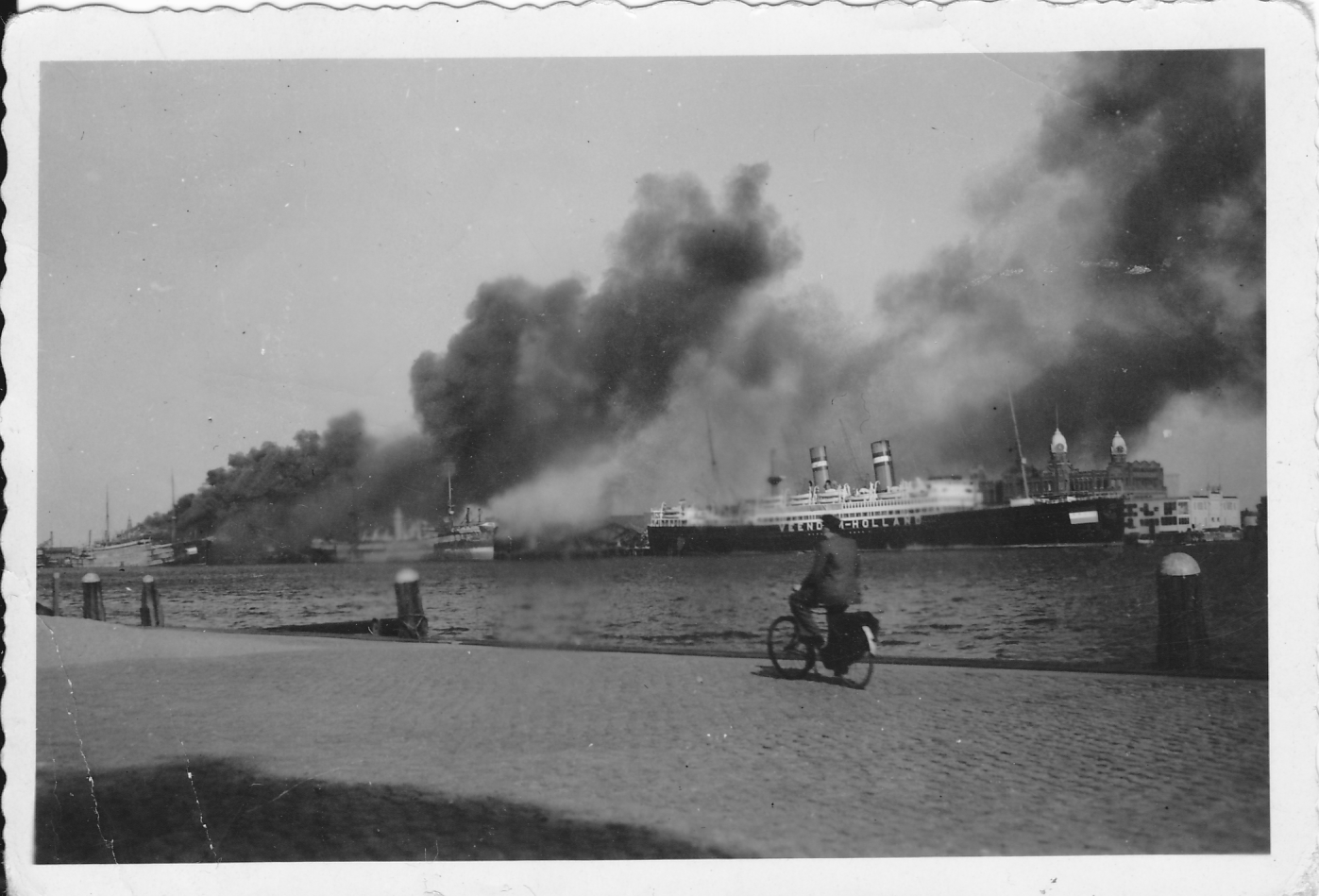
Ships in Rotterdam including Statendam (far left) and Veendam (right) burning on 11 May 1940. On the right, behind Veendam's foredeck, is the NASM headquarters building.

On 10 May 1940 Germany invaded the Netherlands. The next day Statendam caught fire. Some sources assert that she was deliberately set on fire to prevent her from being of use to German forces. One asserts that a German air raid caused the fire. Another asserts she was caught in crossfire between Dutch and German forces. Another asserts that artillery damaged her. One detailed assertion is that the fire was caused by Dutch troops on the other side of the harbour shooting at machine gun positions that German troops had set up on Statendam.

The ship was deemed a constructive total loss. By 14 August 1940 her hulk had been sold to Frank Rijsdijk's Industriële Ondernemingen, who scrapped her at Hendrik-Ido-Ambacht.

== Bibliography ==
- Haws, Duncan (1995). Holland America Line. Merchant Fleets series. Vol. 28. Uckfield: Travel Creatours Ltd Publications. ISBN 0946378258.
- "List of Vessels Fitted With Refrigerating Appliances". Lloyd's Register of Shipping (PDF). Vol. I.–Steamers and Motorships Under 300 Tons. Trawlers, Tugs, Dredgers, etc. Sailing Vessels. Shipowners, etc. London: Lloyd's Register of Shipping. 1930 – via Southampton City Council.
- Lloyd's Register of Shipping (PDF). Vol. II.–Steamers and Motorships of 300 Tons Gross and Over. London: Lloyd's Register of Shipping. 1931 – via Southampton City Council.
- Lloyd's Register of Shipping (PDF). Vol. II.–Steamers and Motorships of 300 Tons Gross and Over. London: Lloyd's Register of Shipping. 1934 – via Southampton City Council.
- Talbot-Booth, EC (1936). Ships and the Sea (Third ed.). London: Sampson Low, Marston & Co Ltd.
- Talbot-Booth, EC (1942) [1936]. Ships and the Sea (Seventh ed.). London: Sampson Low, Marston & Co Ltd.
- Wilson, RM (1956). The Big Ships. London: Cassell & Co.
