= SS Rotterdam (1908) =

Dutch passenger ship

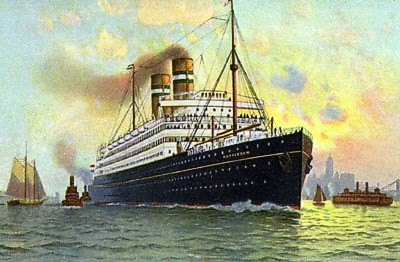
- Oil painting of Rotterdam before 1912

History

Netherlands
- Name: Rotterdam
- Namesake: Rotterdam
- Owner: NASM
- Operator: Holland America Line
- Port of registry: Rotterdam
- Route: Rotterdam – Hoboken
- Builder: Harland & Wolff, Belfast
- Yard number: 390
- Laid down: 6 November 1906
- Launched: 3 March 1908
- Completed: 6 June 1908
- Maiden voyage: 13 June 1908
- Refit: 1926, 1936, 1937
- Identification: code letters PRMN; by 1913: call sign MHR; 1914: call sign PEA; by 1934: call sign PHEG
- Fate: Scrapped in 1940

General characteristics
- Type: Ocean liner
- Tonnage: 24,149 GRT, 15,020 NRT, 14,040 DWT
- Displacement: 36,870 tons
- Length: 650.5 ft (198.3 m) registered
- Beam: 77.4 ft (23.6 m)
- Draught: 33 ft 0 in (10.06 m)
- Depth: 43.5 ft (13.3 m)
- Decks: 4
- Installed power: 2,451 NHP, 15,000 ihp
- Propulsion: 2 × screws; 2 × quadruple expansion engines
- Speed: 17 knots (31 km/h)
- Capacity: Passengers: 1908: 525 1st class, 515 2nd class, 2,400 3rd class; 1929: 517 1st class, 1,130 tourist class; Cargo: 620,000 cubic feet (17,556 m^{3}) grain, 570,000 cubic feet (16,141 m^{3}) bale
- Crew: 472
- Sensors & processing systems: by 1910: submarine signalling; by 1930: wireless direction finding

SS Rotterdam was a steam ocean liner that was launched and completed in Ireland in 1908, and scrapped in the Netherlands in 1940. Holland America Line (HAL) owned and operated her throughout her career. She was the fourth of seven HAL ships to have been named after the Dutch city of Rotterdam. Until Statendam entered service in 1929, Rotterdam was the largest and swiftest ship in the company's fleet, and was the company's flagship.

== Background ==
In the 1900s HAL increased the size of its largest transatlantic passenger liners. Between 1899 and 1902 it introduced three sister ships of about 12,500 GRT each, two of which were built by Harland & Wolff in Belfast. Then in 1906 Harland & Wolff completed Nieuw Amsterdam, a new HAL flagship of almost 17,000 GRT. Nieuw Amsterdam was also HAL's first ship with quadruple expansion engines, and at 16 knots (30 km/h) she was about 1 knot (2 km/h) swifter than HAL's three 12,500 GRT liners.

HAL then ordered an even larger ship from Harland & Wolff. Early in 1906 HAL had sold its previous Rotterdam to Det Forenede Dampskibsselskab, who renamed her C.F. Tietgen. HAL re-used the name Rotterdam for the new ship.

== Building ==
HAL had ordered the new ship by July 1906. Harland & Wolff built her on slipway number 3 as yard number 390, where she was laid down on 6 November 1906.

Her launch was planned for 22 February 1908. By 1pm that day about 5,000 guests of Harland & Wolff had gathered, and thousands more spectators lined the shores. But two other ships had not been moved out of the way, so the director of the shipyard had to cancel the launch for that day. The next day, a storm prevented the two ships from being moved out of the way, so the launch was cancelled again. A third attempt was cancelled because the grease used to lubricate the slipway had been pushed aside.

Rotterdam was successfully launched on 3 March 1908. She was completed on 6 June that year, when she achieved 16 knots (30 km/h) on her sea trials. She then went to Southampton to be inspected in dry dock.

== Description ==
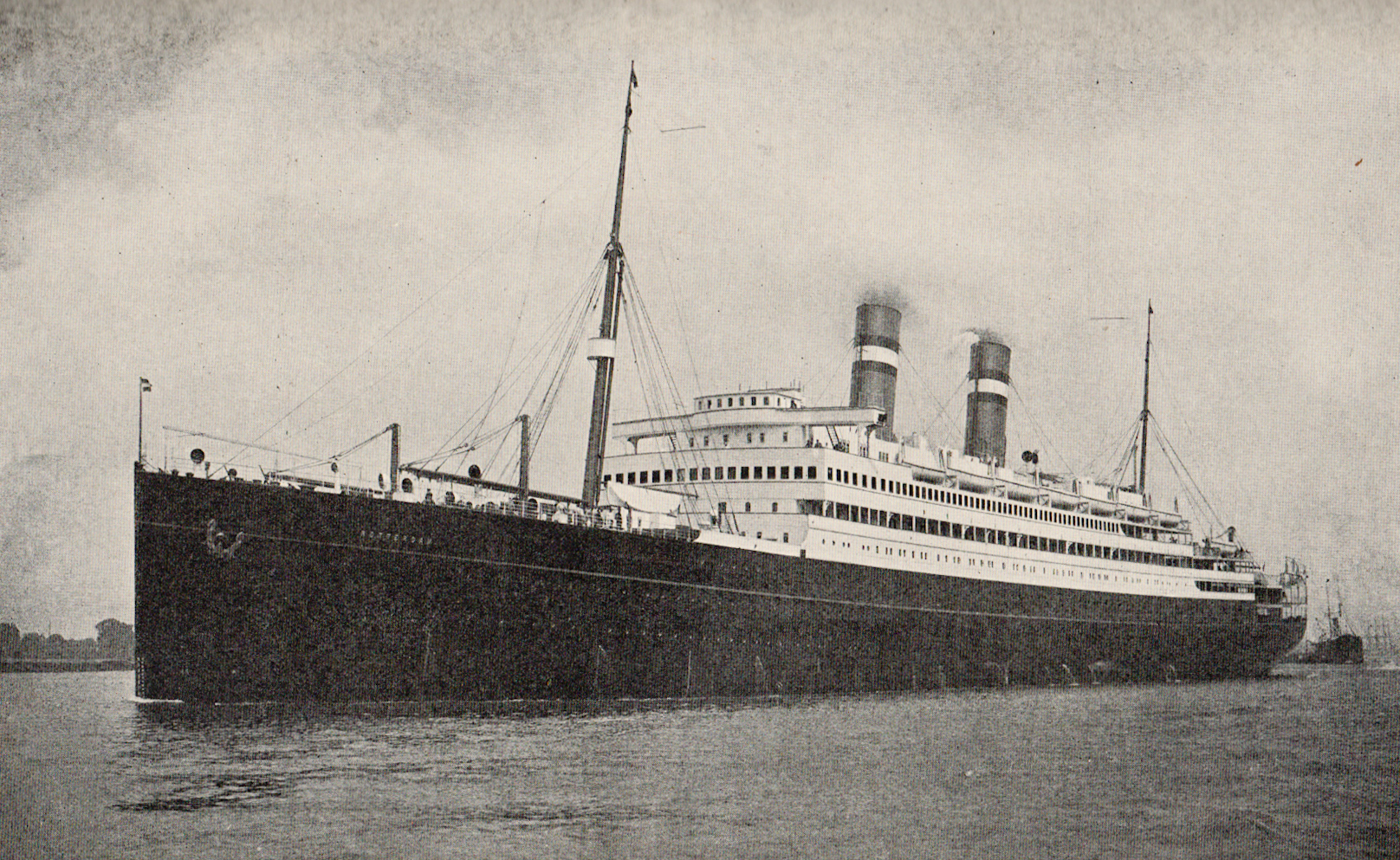
Rotterdam in about 1910

=== Hull ===
Rotterdam's registered length was 650.5 ft (198.3 m), her beam was 77.4 ft (23.6 m) and her depth was 43.5 ft (13.3 m). Her tonnages were 24,149 GRT, 15,020 NRT and 14,040 DWT. Her displacement was 36,870 tons at 35 feet (10.67 m) draught. The hull was divided into watertight compartments by 13 transverse bulkheads and one bulkhead along the centre line of the ship. The bottom of the hull was double. She had bilge keels.

=== Propulsion ===
Rotterdam had eight double-ended and two single-ended boilers, heated by a total of 54 corrugated furnaces. They supplied steam at 215 psi to twin quadruple expansion steam engines, each of which had a 60 in (1.5 m) stroke and cylinders of 33 in (0.84 m), 47 in (1.2 m), 68 in (1.7 m) and 97 1/2 in (2.48 m) bore. The engines drove twin screws. The combined power of the twin engines was rated at 2,451 NHP or 15,000 ihp. Rotterdam was designed to cruise at 16 1/2 knots (31 km/h), and comfortably maintained 17 knots. She had two funnels and two masts, whereas Nieuw Amsterdam had one funnel and four masts.

=== Accommodation ===
Rotterdam had berths for 3,340 passengers: 525 in first class, 515 in second class and 2,400 in third class.

The first class dining saloon was 92 by 75 ft (28 by 23 m) and could seat about 500 diners. Its floor was covered in rubber. The lounge was 52 by 39 ft (16 by 12 m) and was finished with dark Spanish mahogany. It had a piano and an organ. The large lobby was finished in cream lacquered wood and had wide stairs with gilded wrought iron ornamentation and a copper handrail. It led to a palm court of 46 by 39 ft (14 by 12 m), which was finished in cream lacquered wood in Louis XVI style. Its sides contained Delftware tile tableaux. In the center a large cupola with stained glass windows shed light on the garden and stairs. The library measured 34 by 39 ft (10.5 by 12 m) and was decorated in Louis XVI style in Italian juglans wood. The upper and lower smoking saloons measured 59 by 44 ft (18 by 13.5 m) and 30 by 44 ft (9 by 13.5 m).

There were 265 first class cabins, including 48 single person luxury cabins, and 12 state room suites with their own dayroom. There were about 100 first class bathrooms. The wide stairs gave access to the first class promenade decks. There were upper and lower promenade decks and a boat deck, totaling 28,255 sq ft (2,625 m^{2}). Parts of Rotterdam's promenade decks had glass covers that could be brought up against the sea spray. At the time this was a unique innovation among transatlantic liners.

The second class dining saloon was also finished in lacquered wood. It measured 46 by 75 ft (14 by 23 m) and seated 300 diners. On the upper decks was a ladies' saloon, and a smoking saloon finished in oak. The second class promenade decks measured 12,000 sq ft (1,100 m^{2}). There were 158 second class cabins. Many were twin-berth, but there were also some four-berth cabins.

There were two third class dining saloons, measuring 6,230 sq ft (579 m^{2}) in total. Between them, the two saloons could seat only 581 diners, so third class passengers had to eat in shifts. Third class cabins were also twin-berth or four-berth, and got clean bedding each trip. Spacious lobbies with seats led upstairs to the third class promenade deck, which was 11,000 sq ft (1,022 m^{2}).

=== Cargo ===
Rotterdam's holds had capacity for 620,000 cubic feet (17,556 m^{3}) of grain or 570,000 cubic feet (16,141 m^{3}) of baled cargo. This was slightly less than Nieuw Amsterdam, although Rotterdam was a far bigger ship.

=== Crew ===
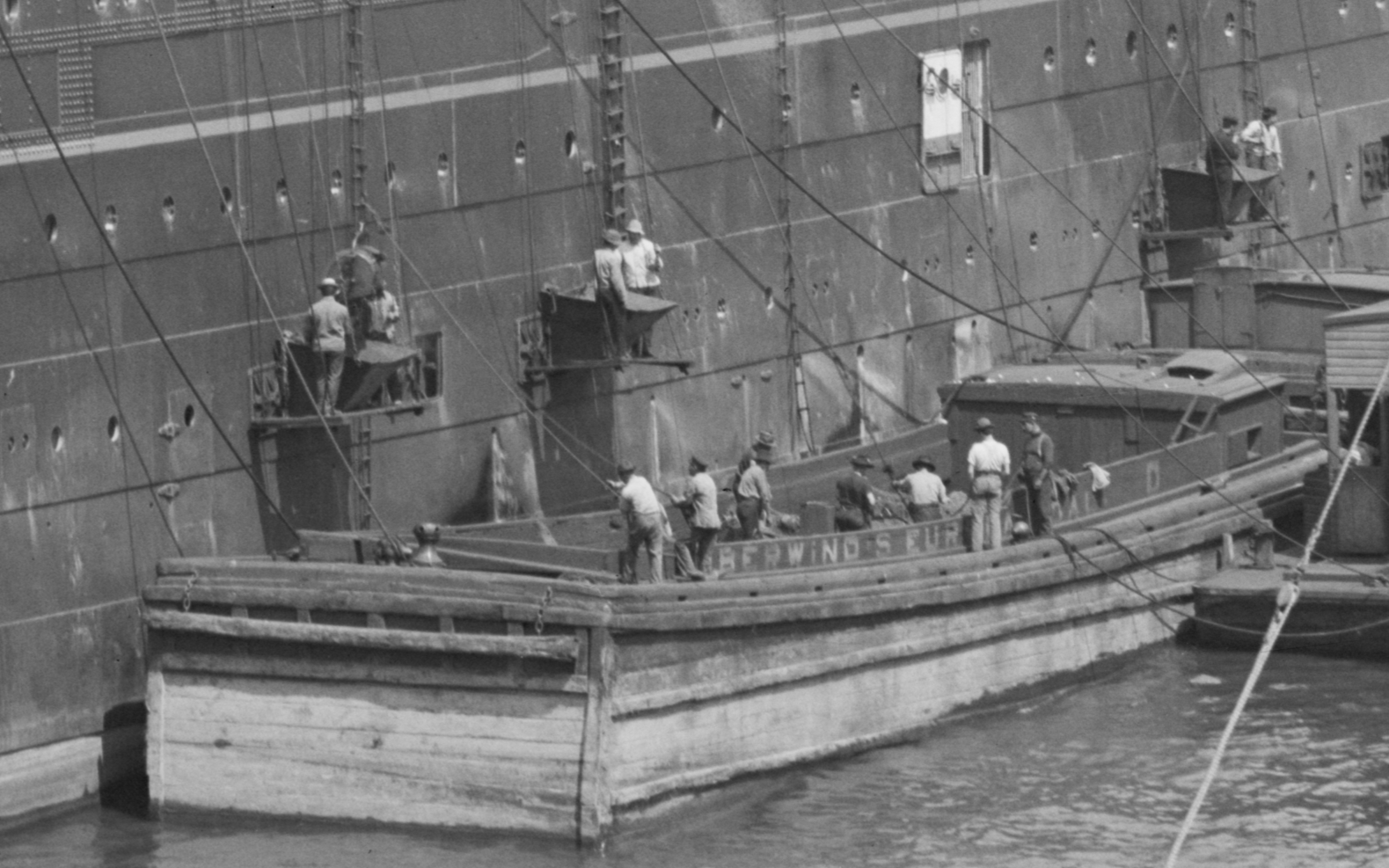
Coal trimmers bunkering Rotterdam at Hoboken, New Jersey

Rotterdam had a crew of 472: 51 on deck, 119 in her engine room and stokehold, and 302 serving the passenger. The Purser had an Assistant Purser and five stewards. There were 126 waiters in first class, 55 in second class and 31 in third class. There were 44 cooks and 15 linen maids. The ship had three electric dishwashers: one with capacity for 4,000 pieces an hour, and two with capacity for 400 pieces an hour. There were also machines to peel potatoes and polish kinves.

== Career ==
HAL registered Rotterdam at her namesake of Rotterdam. Her code letters were PRMN.

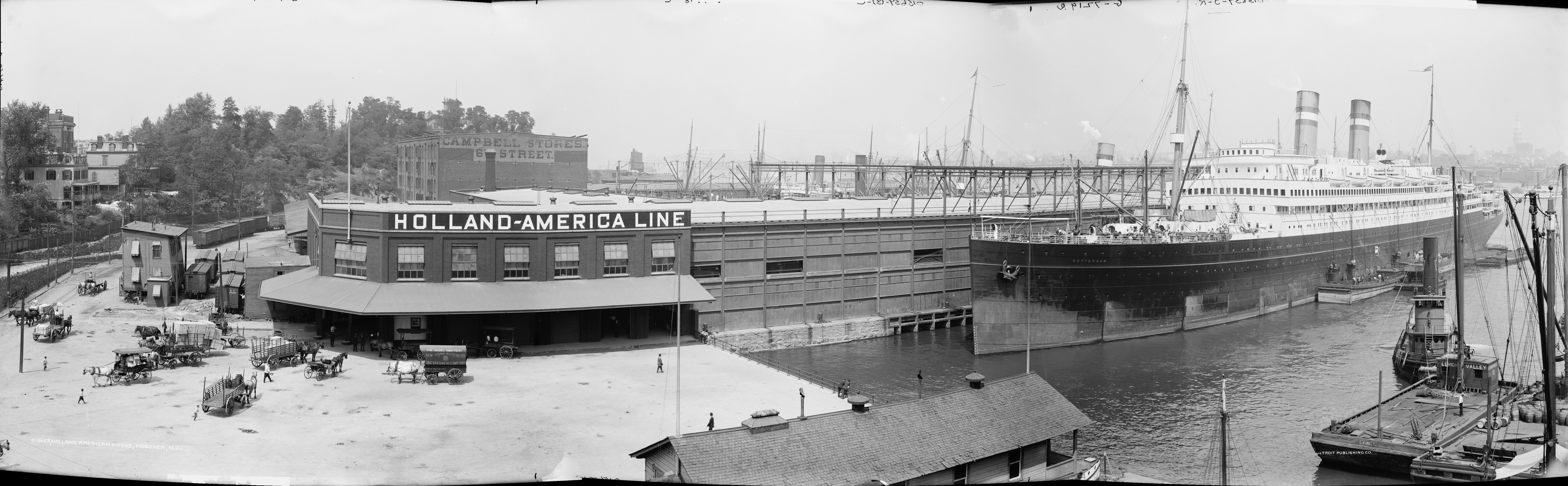
Rotterdam at the HAL terminal in Hoboken, NJ, on one of her first voyages

On 13 June 1908 Rotterdam left Rotterdam on her maiden voyage to Hoboken, New Jersey. She carried only 285 passengers: 75 first class, 82 second class and 128 third class. On 1 July she left Hoboken on her return voyage, carrying 288 passengers in first class, 356 in second class and 298 in third class. 1908 was not a good year for the US economy, and passenger numbers improved only slowly. However, by 1910 Rotterdam was carrying more than 1,000 migrants on each trip.

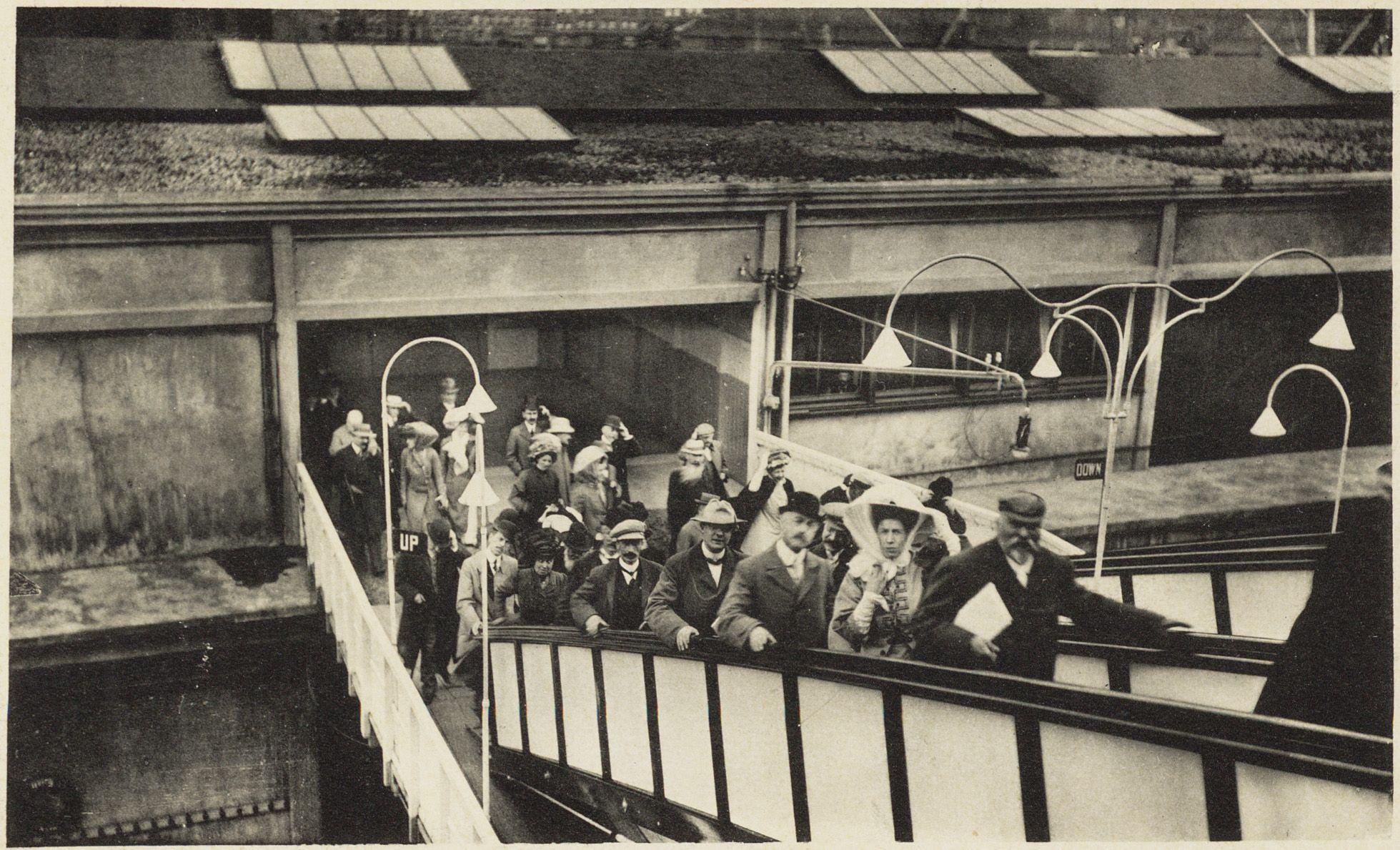
Delegates to the seventh International Congress of Publishers in Amsterdam, boarding Rotterdam in July 1910

By 1910 Rotterdam was equipped for submarine signalling, and the Marconi Company had equipped her for wireless telegraphy. By 1913 her wireless telegraph call sign was MHR, but by 1914 it had been changed to PEA.

By 1914 Rotterdam had begun seasonal cruising. That February she left Hoboken with 842 first class passengers on a cruise to the Mediterranean via Madeira. She toured the Mediterranean, visiting Cádiz, Gibraltar, Algiers, Piraeus, Istanbul, Jaffa, Alexandria, Naples, Villefranche-sur-Mer, and Boulogne.

=== First World War ===
In August 1914 Rotterdam repatriated many US civilians who wanted to leave Germany or Switzerland.

The Netherlands was one of the countries through which the Entente Powers' Blockade of Germany was evaded. Germany sought to import goods including copper, coffee, cotton, wool, livestock fodder, nitrate fertilisers, and up to a third of the total food supply for its population. In September 1914 Rotterdam left Hoboken carrying 1,500 tons of copper. She was arrested and brought to Plymouth on 22 September. However, the copper could not be unloaded from her holds as the Port of Southampton was closed. Instead, the UK government bought the copper, and the ship was released on 6 October. The copper was to be unloaded at Rotterdam and stored there for the UK government.

On 12 October 1914 Rotterdam reached Rotterdam carrying 8,000 25 kg (55 lb) sacks of flour. On 16 October she left for Hoboken again, carrying almost 2,000 passengers. She then made another trip from Rotterdam to Hoboken, and two trips between Italy and Hoboken.

The war sharply reduced the number of emigrants willing to cross the Atlantic. After most US citizens who wished to leave Europe had done so, there were too few passengers to make a profit. In 1915 Rotterdam ran a regular schedule between Rotterdam and Hoboken. Often fewer than 100 passengers embarked in Hoboken, but about 500 embarked in Rotterdam.

Increased cargo trade kept HAL ships busy in the war. After an initial decline, exports from the Netherlands increased. Imports to the Netherlands increased so much that HAL chartered ships to carry the extra cargo. Late in 1915 Rotterdam's cargo included 25,500 bales (60 kg (130 lb) sacks) of coffee.

The Entente Powers often inspected neutral ships, to try to ensure they were not violating their blockade of the Central Powers. On a westbound voyage in June 1915 the Royal Navy held Rotterdam for a total of eight days, first at The Downs and then at Avonmouth.

On 29 August 1915 a fire was discovered in her mailroom. Sulphur gas was pumped into the compartment in an attempt to extinguish the fire. On arrival in Rotterdam on 2 September it was found that the fire was still burning, so it was extinguished with water. The fire probably started in her cargo of cotton. Of the 201 sacks of mail stored above, seven were burnt, and the rest were badly damaged by water. In the first years of the war the Rotterdam also regularly transported gold to the Netherlands.

On 11 May 1916 Rotterdam left Hoboken for Rotterdam. In England the UK authorities seized her mail. Also in England, she embarked survivors from the Royal Rotterdam Lloyd ship Palembang, which a mine planted by UC-10 had sunk on 18 March.

HAL then laid up Rotterdam. The official reason was that were she lost, she could not be replaced for many years because Dutch shipyards were not able to build a ship of the size of the Rotterdam. In July 1914 Harland & Wolff had launched a new Statendam for HAL, a ship even larger than Rotterdam, but in 1915 the UK government had requisitioned the uncompleted ship for conversion into a troopship. She was completed in 1917 as Justicia, and sunk by a U-boat in July 1918. Rotterdam remained safely laid up after Germany's resumption of unrestricted submarine warfare in February 1917.

=== Between the wars ===
After the Armistice of 11 November 1918, Rotterdam was dry docked in Glasgow, as the Netherlands had no dry dock big enough for her. On 24 January she left Rotterdam for Hoboken carrying fewer than 100 passengers, but in Brest, France she embarked many US troops. She continued to repatriate US troops for some months, and on 24 January 1919 she resumed civilian service between Rotterdam and Hoboken. In 1920 she was converted from coal to oil fuel.

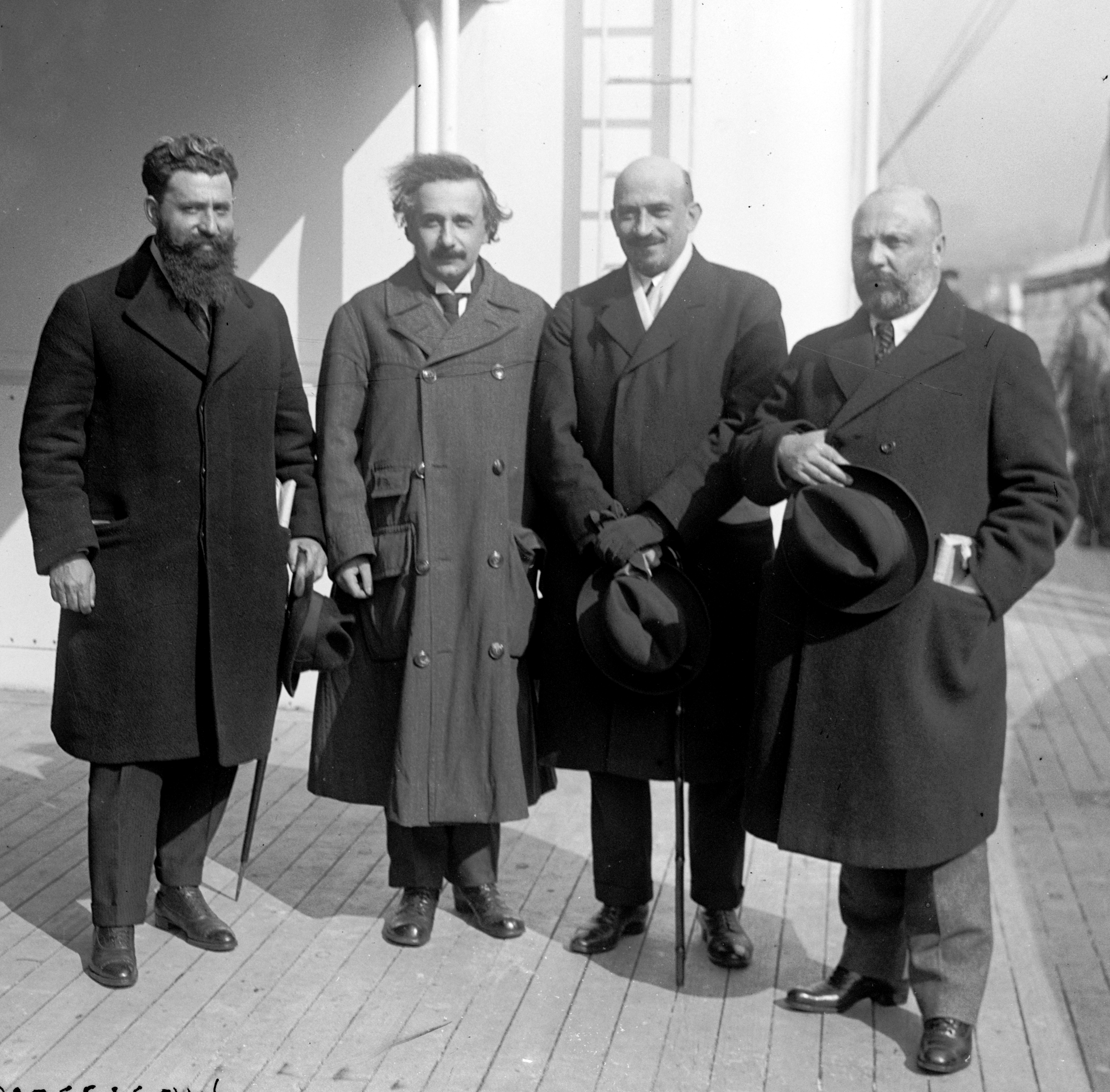
WZO delegation aboard Rotterdam, 2 April 1921. From left to right: Ben-Zion Mossinson, Albert Einstein, Chaim Weizmann and Menachem Ussishkin.

At the beginning of April 1921, a delegation of the World Zionist Organization sailed from Rotterdam to Hoboken aboard Rotterdam. They included Albert Einstein, Ben-Zion Mossinson, Menachem Ussishkin and Chaim Weizmann. Also in April 1921, Rotterdam became the first ship to use the new 46,000-ton dry dock at Wilton's Dok- en Werf Maatschappij in Schiedam.

In the 1920s Rotterdam resumed winter cruises from Hoboken to the Mediterranean, including in 1923, February 1924, and February 1925. In 1929 she was refitted as a two-class ship, with berths for 517 first class and 1,130 tourist class passengers.

The Great Depression that began in 1929 brought a global slump in commercial shipping. On 24 December 1930, NASM revised its fares for 1931. Fares were seasonal, and until 1930 the company had divided them into summer, winter, and intermediate. For 1931, NASM abolished the intermediate seasons, simplified the fares to summer and winter only, and announced significant reductions. On Rotterdam, the minimum first class fare would be US$200 eastbound from August to April, and the same westbound from November to July. The minimum first class fare for summer, which now included the former "intermediate" seasons, would be $220.

Rotterdam was a coal-burner. At the beginning of September 1932, members of the Bond voor Minder Marine Personeel (BMMP) trade union working for most Dutch shipping lines struck for better wages. As Rotterdam left Boulogne on 4 September on a westbound crossing, her ships' stokers demanded that she terminate her voyage and return to Rotterdam. Her Master anchored her near the West Hinder lightvessel, where a detachment of 30 Dutch Marines boarded the ship from a pilot boat. The ship returned to Rotterdam, where 11 members of her crew were arrested for mutiny. On 7 September, NASM announced that it would not re-hire 400 BMMP members. Rotterdam and other NASM ships remained in Rotterdam as the strike continued.

On 15 September some shipping lines reached an agreement with the BMMP, oncluding reinstatement of the 400 members that NASM had dismissed, but BMMP members at Rotterdam voted to reject it. However, the "contact commission" between the shipping companies and the BMMP established that an aggregate of the votes from the separate mass meetings at Amsterdam and Rotterdam produced a majority in favour of returning to work. NASM crews resumed service. Veendam left Rotterdam on 17 September, and all ships returned to normal their schedule.

Late in 1933, Rotterdam was reconditioned, and an artificial beach was installed in one of her well decks. She started her cruising season on 18 November, leaving Hoboken with 450 passengers on a cruise to the West Indies. On 23 December she left Hoboken on a nine-day cruise to Nassau and Kingston. On 3 March 1934, she left Hoboken on a cruise to Central America.

By 1930 Rotterdam was equipped with wireless direction finding. By 1934 the new four-letter call sign PHEG had replaced her code letters and three-letter call sign. Also by 1934, her hull had been repainted white.

Volendam and her sister Veendam were rarely in the same port at the same time. One exception was on 16 March 1935 in Hoboken, when Veendam arrived from Rotterdam in the morning, and Volendam was already in port, waiting to start a cruise to Nassau and Bermuda on 23 March. Rotterdam, Edam and the cargo steamship Beemsterdijk were also at Hoboken on the same day. It was rare for five NASM ships to be in the same port on the same day.

On 29 September 1935, Rotterdam was cruising off Jamaica at the time of the 1935 Cuba hurricane when she ran aground on Morant Cays. The Elders & Fyffes banana boat SS Ariguani took off all of her 460 passengers and 70 of her crew, and landed them at Kingston. On 1 October, NASM's Volendam left Hoboken, without passengers. On 7 October she left Kingston carrying 350 of Rotterdam's passengers and crew, and on 11 October she landed them at Hoboken. Rotterdam was refloated on 5 October.

In January 1936 HAL reclassified Rotterdam, Volendam and Veendam as "cabin class" ships. Rotterdam's one-way fares were reduced from $169.50 to $161.50 in the summer season, and from $161.50 to $153.50 in the off-season. HAL was the last major shipping line to adopt cabin class.

In 1937 Rotterdam made a summer cruise to the North Cape and the Baltic. In Leningrad the Soviet authorities refused to let some passengers ashore from Rotterdam and three other ships. The reason why they chose certain passengers for exclusion was not clear.

=== End of career ===
Polygoon-journaal newsreel from January 1940 showing Rotterdam being moved from Wilhelminakade to Waalhaven to be scrapped. Note the neutrality markings on the side of her hull

On 21 November 1939 Rotterdam began her final transatlantic voyage from Rotterdam to New York. She got back to Rotterdam on 28 December. By then she had steamed the equivalent of 70 times the circumference of the earth.

In January 1940 HAL sold Rotterdam to Frank Rijsdijk's Industriëele ondernemingen of Hendrik-Ido-Ambacht for scrap. On 5 January 1940 she was towed from the Wilhelminakade to Waalhaven, where her superstructure was demolished.

HAL next used the name for the Rotterdam launched in 1958. She is now a combined hotel, museum ship and vocational education school.

== Bibliography ==
- Collard, Ian (2018), Holland America Cruise Ships, Stroud: Amberley Publishing, ISBN 978-1445667614
- Dowling, R (1909) [1903]. All About Ships & Shipping (3rd ed.). London: Alexander Moring Ltd.
- Lloyd's Register of British and Foreign Shipping. Vol. I.–Steamers. London: Lloyd's Register of Shipping. 1910 – via Internet Archive.
- Lloyd's Register of Shipping (PDF). Vol. II.–Steamers and Motorships of 300 Tons Gross and Over. London: Lloyd's Register of Shipping. 1930 – via Southampton City Council.
- Lloyd's Register of Shipping (PDF). Vol. II.–Steamers and Motorships of 300 Tons Gross and Over. London: Lloyd's Register of Shipping. 1934 – via Southampton City Council.
- The Marconi Press Agency Ltd (1913). The Year Book of Wireless Telegraphy and Telephony. London: The St Katherine Press.
- The Marconi Press Agency Ltd (1914). The Year Book of Wireless Telegraphy and Telephony. London: The Marconi Press Agency Ltd.
