= SS Volendam =

Dutch-owned transatlantic liner and troop ship

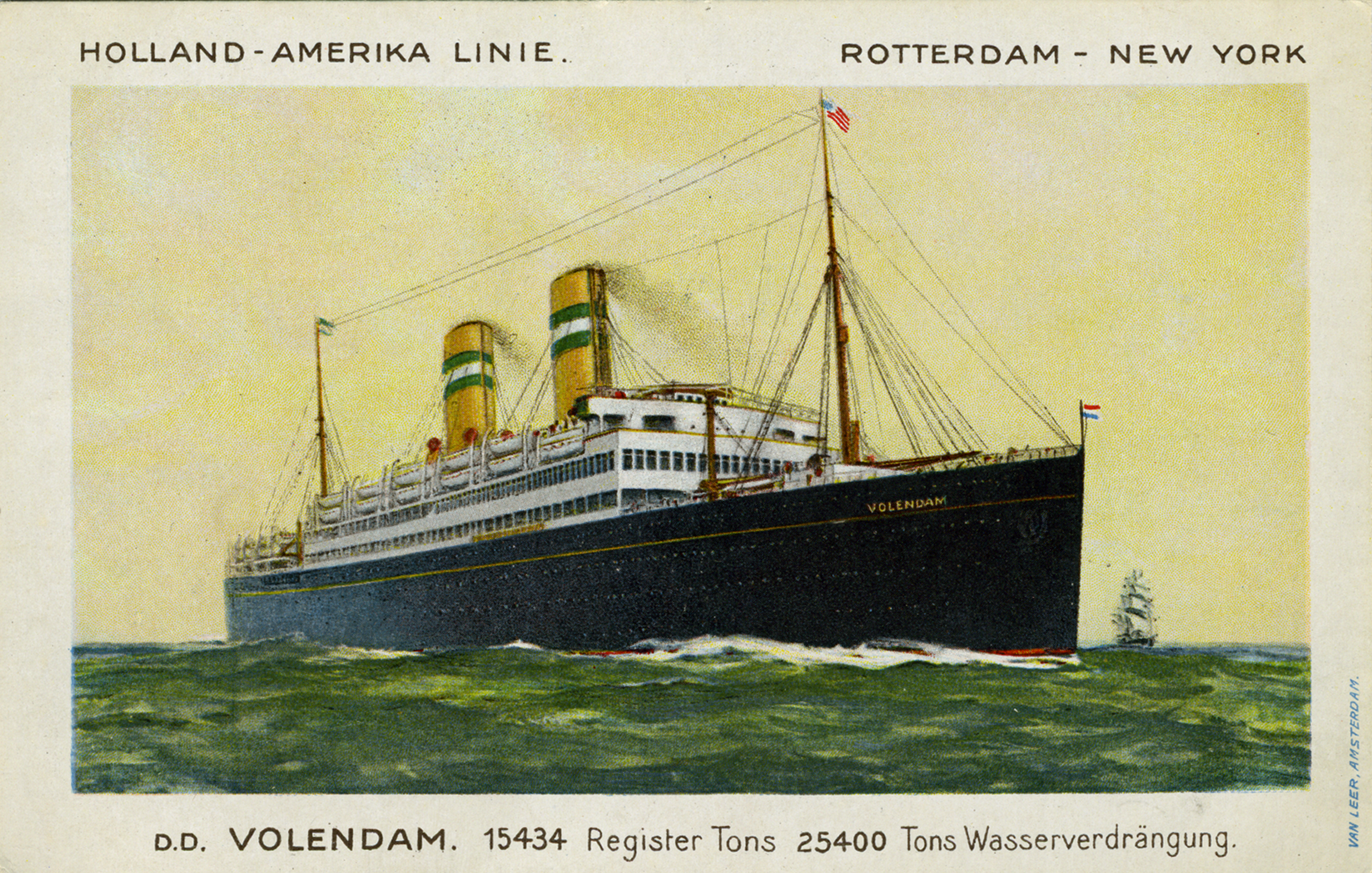
- Postcard of Volendam

History

Netherlands
- Name: Volendam
- Namesake: Volendam
- Owner: NASM
- Operator: Holland America Line
- Port of registry: Rotterdam
- Route: 1922: Rotterdam – Hoboken; 1939: Antwerp – Hoboken; 1940: Rotterdam – Hoboken; 1948: Rotterdam – Hoboken or Quebec
- Builder: Harland & Wolff, Govan
- Yard number: 649
- Launched: 6 July 1922
- Completed: 12 October 1922
- Maiden voyage: 4 November 1922
- Out of service: 1951
- Refit: 1928, 1937, 1941, 1948
- Identification: until 1933: code letters PWQC; by 1934: call sign PIHP
- Fate: Scrapped in 1952

General characteristics
- Type: ocean liner
- Tonnage: 15,434 GRT, 9,197 NRT, 13,713 DWT
- Length: 575 ft (175 m) overall; 550.2 ft (167.7 m)
- Beam: 67.3 ft (20.5 m)
- Draught: 32 ft 5 in (9.88 m)
- Depth: 32.6 ft (9.9 m)
- Decks: 2
- Installed power: 1,913 NHP; 8,000 bhp
- Propulsion: 4 × steam turbines; single-reduction gearing; 2 × screws
- Speed: 15 knots (28 km/h)
- Capacity: cargo: 484,000 cu ft (13,700 m^{3}) grain; 453,000 cu ft (12,800 m^{3}) bale; passengers: 1922: 263 × 1st class, 436 × 2nd class, 200 × 3rd class; 1928: 263 × 1st class, 428 × 2nd class, 484 × tourist class; 1937: 261 × 1st class, 266 × tourist class, 315 × 3rd class; 1948: 1,682 × tourist class
- Troops: 3,000
- Crew: 273
- Sensors & processing systems: 1924: submarine signalling; 1930: wireless direction finding; 1946: radar
- Armament: in Second World War: DEMS
- Notes: sister ship: Veendam

SS Volendam was a Dutch-owned transatlantic liner, launched in Scotland in 1922 and scrapped in the Netherlands in 1952. She was part of the first generation of turbine-powered steamships in the Holland America Line (Nederlandsch-Amerikaansche Stoomvaart Maatschappij, or NASM) fleet. Volendam and her sister ship Veendam were NASM's largest turbine steamships until the flagship Statendam was completed in 1929.

In the 1920s and 30s, Volendam spent most of her career on scheduled services between Rotterdam and Hoboken, New Jersey. She also operated seasonal cruises: mostly to the Caribbean, but occasionally to the Mediterranean, and to Norway. In the Second World War, she evacuated refugees from Europe, including children from Britain, until in 1940 she was damaged by two torpedoes.

In 1941 she returned to service as a troop ship. In 1947, she became an emigrant ship, at first carrying mostly Dutch emigrants. In 1948 she returned to transatlantic service, offering budget travel, which attracted US and Canadian students making their summer vacation in Europe. She was scrapped in 1952.

This was the first NASM ship to be named after the town of Volendam in North Holland. NASM next used the name in 1972, when it bought and renamed the turbine steamship Brasil.

== Building ==
In 1922, Harland & Wolff launched two liners at its shipyard in Govan, Glasgow, for NASM. Volendam was built as yard number 649 on slipway number 6, launched on 6 July 1922, and completed on 12 October that year. Her sister Veendam was launched on 18 November 1922 and completed on 29 March 1923.

Volendam's lengths were 575 ft (175 m) overall and 550.2 ft (167.7 m) registered. Her beam was 67.3 ft (20.5 m) and her depth was 32.6 ft (9.9 m). Her tonnages were 15,434 GRT, 9,197 NRT and 13,713 DWT. As built, she had berths for 899 passengers: 263 in first class, 436 in second class, and 200 in third class. Her holds had capacity for 484,000 cubic feet (13,700 m^{3}) of grain, or 453,000 cubic feet (12,800 m^{3}) of baled cargo.

Her public rooms included a First Class smoking room decorated in early Tudor style, with a fireplace, and oak-panelled walls and ceiling. Passengers had control of the heating and ventilation of their individual cabins, which in 1922 was an innovation.

The ship had two screws and four turbines: two high-pressure and two low-pressure. Each screw was driven by one high-pressure and one low-pressure turbine via single-reduction gearing. Her nine water-tube boilers were oil-fuelled, and supplied steam to her high-pressure turbines at 215 psi. The combined power of her four turbines was rated at 1,913 NHP or 8,000 bhp, and gave her a speed of 15 knots (28 km/h).

NASM registered Volendam at Rotterdam. Her code letters were PWQC.

== Early years ==
Volendam began her maiden voyage from Rotterdam on 4 November, called at Boulogne and Plymouth, and arrived in Hoboken with 750 passengers on 15 November. On 18 November she hosted a luncheon for 300 guests, addressed by speakers including the Chargé d'affaires form the Embassy of the Netherlands, Washington, D.C.

On an eastbound voyage on 3 March 1926, Volendam rescued the captain and five crew members of a schooner that had been adrift for 77 days, without sails, and sinking. On another eastbound voyage in April 1926, a passenger was lost overboard.

On 29 January 1927, Volendam left Hoboken on her first cruise. It was to the Caribbean, which became her most frequent destination for winter cruises. In 1928 her passenger accommodation was revised to 263 first class, 428 second class, and 484 tourist class. In 1929 she made three Caribbean cruises, leaving Hoboken on 26 January, 16 February and 9 March. Ports of call included Port-au-Prince, Venezuela, and the Panama Canal. Haiti was then a novelty as a cruise destination, and NASM was the only company to include it in its cruises that year.

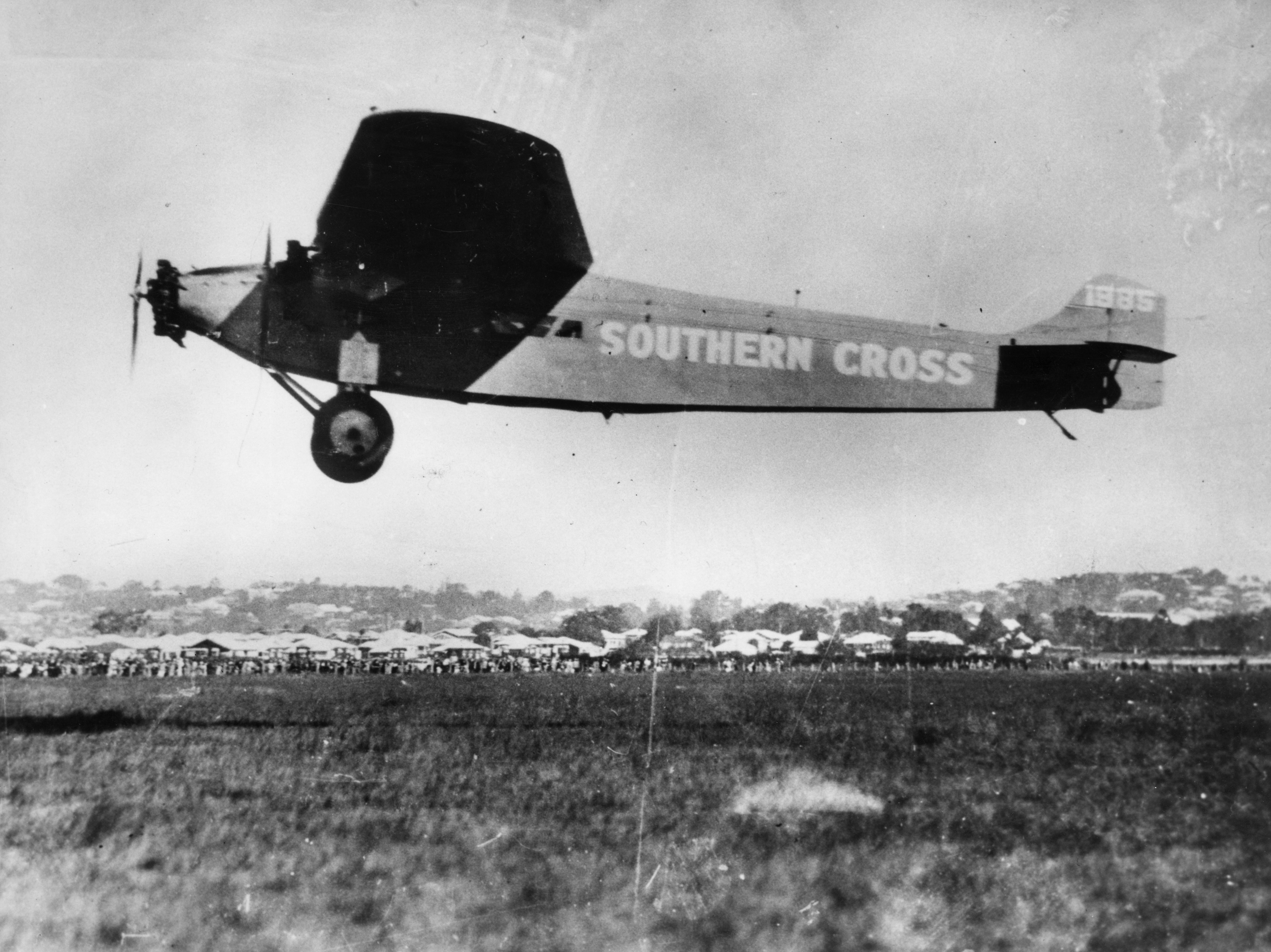
Southern Cross in flight

By 1930, Volendam's navigation equipment included wireless direction finding. Coincidentally, on a westbound crossing in June 1930, the wireless telegraphist of Charles Kingsford Smith's Fokker F.VII aircraft Southern Cross, on a 12-hour transatlantic flight to Newfoundland, contacted Volendam with a request for bearings. Volendam replied that she was at about 51°N 25°W, and that Southern Cross was about 30 nautical miles (56 km) north of her.

The Great Depression that began in 1929 brought a global slump in commercial shipping. On 24 December 1930, NASM revised its fares for 1931. Fares were seasonal, and had been divided into summer, winter, and intermediate. NASM abolished the intermediate seasons, simplified the fares to summer and winter only, and announced significant reductions. On Volendam and Veendam, the minimum first class fare would be US$122.50 for summer and $165 for winter. The summer fare for a two-berth cabin with a window and ensuite bathroom was reduced from $345 to $222.50. A two-berth cabin on "A" deck with an outside window would be reduced from $275 or $285 to $212.50.

On 3 October 1931, Volendam left Hoboken carrying $10 million in gold for banks in Amsterdam.

== More cruises and longer cruises ==
On 18 March 1933, Volendam was due to leave Hoboken on a 12-day Caribbean cruise. A month before she was due to sail, NASM shortened the cruise to nine days, omitting a call at Kingston, Jamaica, and reduced the fares accordingly. On 4 July 1933, Volendam left Hoboken on a cruise to the Mediterranean. The voyage had been planned to take 54 days, cover 13,000 nautical miles (24,000 km), and visit 12 countries, including Norway to see some of its fjords. She returned via Rotterdam, and reached Hoboken on 28 August.

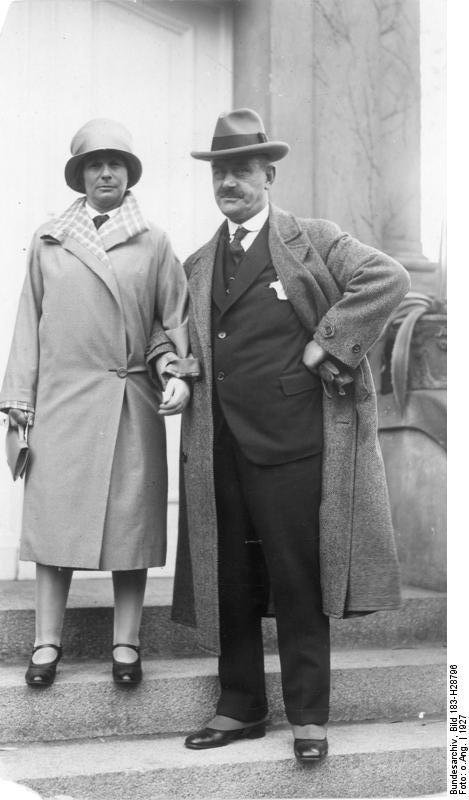
Thomas and Katia Mann, who crossed the Atlantic on Volendam in 1934

On 19 May 1934, the author Thomas Mann and his wife Katia embarked on Volendam at Boulogne. Germany had exiled Mann, and he had obtained a visa to move to the USA. They landed at Hoboken on 29 May. During the voyage, Mann planned his book Meerfahrt mit Don Quijote ("Sea Voyage with Don Quixote"), which refers to life aboard Volendam.

By 1934, the wireless telegraph call sign PIHP had replaced Volendam's code letters. The ship was scheduled to make a seven-day cruise from Rotterdam to Norway and Denmark in June 1934.

A month later, National Tours rescheduled the long cruise to leave Hoboken on 23 February. The Pacific coast of South America was still on the itinerary, but no Pacific islands were mentioned. Instead, her ports of call were to include Saint Thomas, U.S. Virgin Islands, Fort-de-France, Bridgetown, Port of Spain, La Guaira, Willemstad and San Juan.

A company called National Tours chartered Volendam for a series of cruises in February and March 1935. One left Hoboken on 12 February, called at Nassau and Havana, and was for nine days. The next left Hoboken on 23 February, and included Saint Thomas, U.S. Virgin Islands, Martinique, Barbados, Trinidad, Caripito, Ciudad Bolívar, and Curaçao. On 12 March the ship was due to cruise to Havana and Nassau with 250 passengers, but National Tours cancelled it due to unrest in Cuba. Passengers were offered berths on Rotterdam, which was due to leave Hoboken on 16 March on a cruise to St Thomas, Port-au-Prince, Curaçao and La Guaira. On 27 March, Volendam called at St. George's, Bermuda as part of a cruise with 325 passengers. She was the first ship to use a new channel, 30 feet (9 m) deep and 250 feet (76 m) wide, that had been dredged into St George's harbour.

On 2 July 1935, Volendam left Hoboken to repeat the cruise to the Mediterranean and Norway that she had made in 1933. The cruise was fully-booked with 450 passengers, and was scheduled to take 54 days. The cruise was to include a voyage up Nærøyfjord to Gudvangen in western Norway.

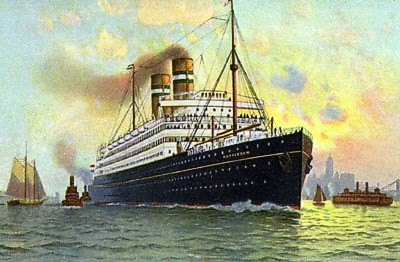
A painting of Rotterdam, which grounded on Morant Cays in 1935. Volendam brought her passengers and many of her crew from Kingston, Jamaica back to Hoboken

On 29 September 1935, Rotterdam was cruising off Jamaica at the time of the 1935 Cuba hurricane when she ran aground on Morant Cays. The Elders & Fyffes banana boat Ariguani took off all of her 460 passengers and 70 of her crew, and landed them at Kingston. On 1 October Volendam left Hoboken, without passengers. On 7 October she left Kingston carrying 350 of Rotterdam's passengers and crew, and on 11 October she landed them at Hoboken. Rotterdam was refloated on 5 October.

== Cabin class ==
In January 1936, HAL reclassified Rotterdam, Volendam and Veendam as "cabin class" ships. Volendam and Veendam's one-way fares were reduced from $149.50 to $141.50 in the summer season, and from $142.50 to $134 in the off-season. HAL was the last major shipping line to adopt cabin class. The Society of Beaux-Arts chartered Volendam for a charity fund-raising cruise to Nassau for the Architects Emergency Relief Fund. Volendam was to leave Hoboken on 11 March, and the passenger list was limited to 250.

Volendam did not always work continuous seasons of either transatlantic services or cruises. She sometimes alternated between different duties in the same season. For example, in 1937, in the middle of the winter cruise season, she left Rotterdam on 13 February, reached Hoboken on 24 February, left Hoboken on 27 February, and arrived in Bermuda on 1 March.

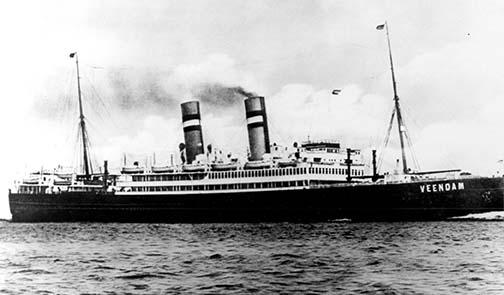
Volendam's sister ship Veendam

In 1937, the passenger accommodation on both Volendam and Veendam was extensively refurnished. In third class, upper berths were removed, new wardrobes and other furniture were installed, and "noiseless" fans were installed in cabins. Public areas were recarpeted, and the dining saloons were refurnished with new chairs and smaller tables. First class and tourist class cabins were also refurnished, and cocktail bars were installed near the dining saloons.

On 7 February 1939, Volendam arrived at Hoboken carrying gold worth US$18 million from Europe. $9,354,000 was from the United Kingdom and $7,347,000 was from the Netherlands. The shipment was the first part of a total of $66 million being moved from Europe to the USA.

On 5 May 1939, Volendam left Hoboken with 371 passengers on a 13-day cruise to Bermuda, Nassau and Havana. She called at Nassau, and was en route to Bermuda, when on 9 May she struck a submerged object, which damaged one of her propellers and forced her to reduce speed. Her Master cancelled her call at Bermuda, and she returned directly to Hoboken for repairs. Passengers were offered the options of either a 50 per cent refund, or an eight-day cruise aboard Rotterdam, which would leave Hoboken on 3 June.

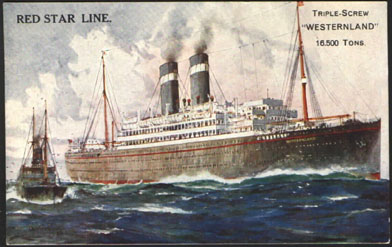
The former Red Star Liner Westernland, one of Volendam's running-mates on the Antwerp – Hoboken route

In May 1939, NASM bought Red Star Line, which the German government had forced Arnold Bernstein to sell. On 11 June, NASM announced that it would double the frequency of the former Red Star service between Antwerp and Hoboken by transferring Volendam and Veendam to the route to work alongside the Red Star liners Pennland and Westernland. All four ships on the route would call at Boulogne and Southampton in both directions. Volendam was to make her first sailing from Antwerp on 29 July.

== Crisis in Europe ==
On 1 September 1939 the Second World War began. NASM had Volendam's hull painted with neutrality markings: "VOLENDAM – HOLLAND" painted amidships in large white capital letters, and a large Dutch flag painted either side of her bow. Volendam left Antwerp as scheduled on 9 September. After calling at Boulogne and Southampton she was carrying 845 passengers, including 600 US citizens.

The passengers included Sherwood Eddy and the Italian Consul-General to Santo Domingo, Amadeo Barletta Barletta. Eddy gave a 90-minute impromptu lecture about the war to about 150 passengers in the ship's library. He told his audience that he proposed to give a second lecture the next evening. Barletta objected that Eddy's lecture was both "pro-British" and "pro-Bolshevik", and complained to Volendam's Master, Jan Wepster. Captain Wepster responded with a notice to all passengers.

"This ship is Holland territory. Holland is neutral in the present war. It is strictly forbidden by our government to make propaganda or have meetings for or against any country with which our country maintains friendly relations. Therefore I cannot allow any lectures or meetings to be held for propaganda for or against any government. And please do not forget that we have twenty-two different nationalities on board.

Volendam reached Hoboken on 21 September. Two days later she left Hoboken bound for Antwerp, but the Royal Navy detained her at Weymouth Bay and at the Downs as part of the Allied Blockade of Germany. She then diverted to Rotterdam. Thereafter, NASM returned her to the Rotterdam – Hoboken route. It became normal to be detained in both directions at either the Downs or Weymouth Bay. Each round trip from Rotterdam to Hoboken and back could take two months or more.

Volendam left Rotterdam on 16 December, called briefly at the Downs or Southampton, and reached Hoboken on 30 December 1939. But on her return voyage she left Hoboken on 4 January 1940, stopped at the Downs from 15 to 23 January, and diverted to Amsterdam, where she arrived on 28 January.

Volendam started her next crossing from Rotterdam on 10 February 1940, called at Southampton, and on 22 February landed 535 passengers at Hoboken, including 395 refugees for central Europe and 29 US citizens. She left Hoboken on 29 February, stopped at the Downs from 10 to 27 March, and reached Rotterdam on 30 March.

Volendam left Rotterdam again on 5 April. She was carrying 703 sacks of mail for the US, but when she called at Southampton on 7 April, the British authorities seized them all. She reached Hoboken on 17 April carrying 428 passengers, including 330 refugees.

Volendam left Hoboken on 25 April, and was due in Rotterdam on 6 May. Instead, from 6 May she was detained in Weymouth Bay. She was still there when Germany invaded the Netherlands on 10 May.

== British control ==
Volendam left Weymouth Bay on 25 May and sailed to London. By 27 May, Germany had occupied the whole of the Netherlands. By 7 June, Dutch government-in-exile and the UK government had formed a British-Netherlands shipping committee in London, and NASM announced that it would charter to the UK government all of its transatlantic ships except the flagship Nieuw Amsterdam.

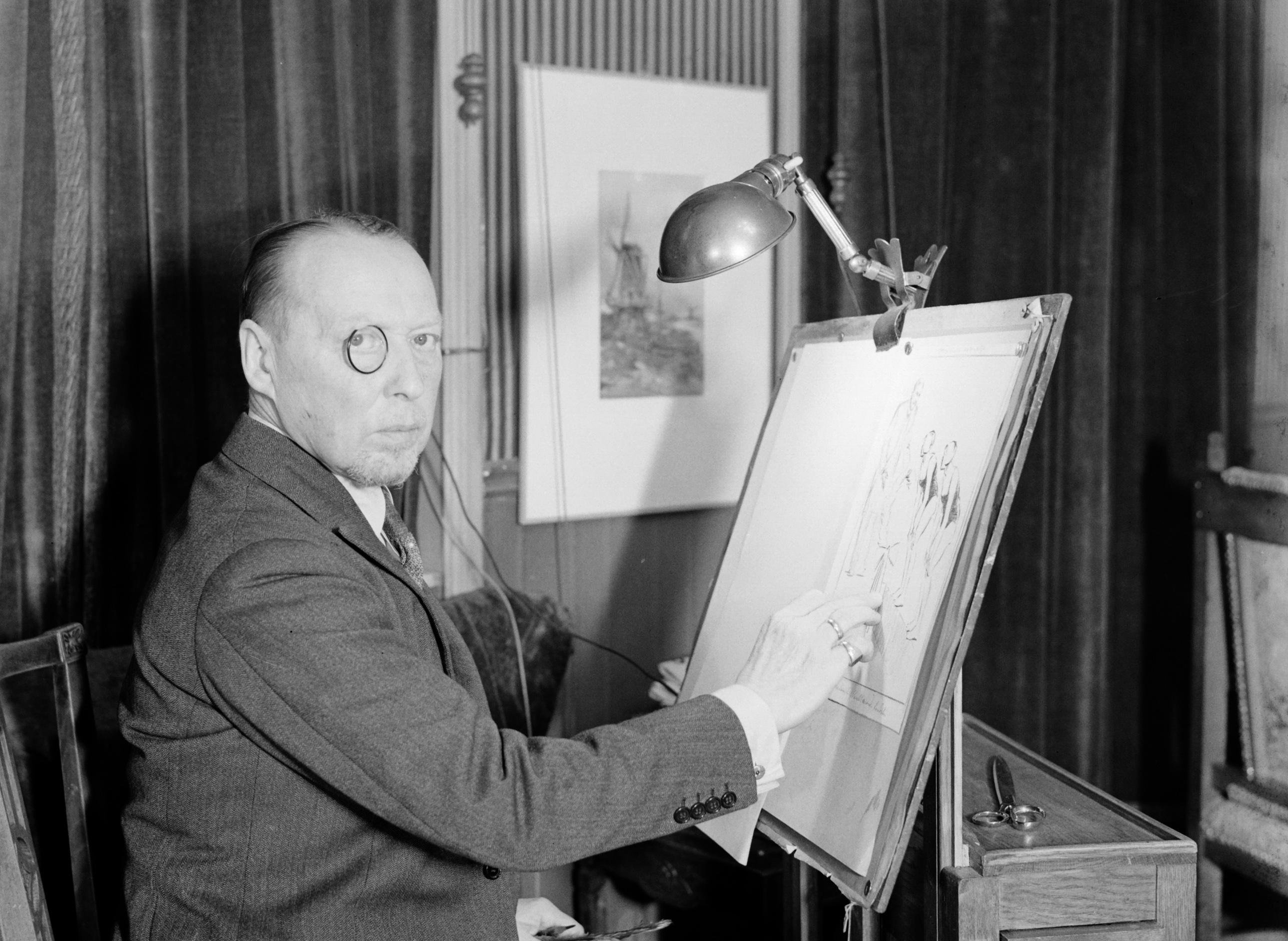
Louis Raemaekers at his easel

Volendam made one more North Atlantic crossing to Hoboken and back. On 13 June she left London, and the next day she joined Convoy OA 168GF, which was forming at sea off Southend. She detached from OA 168GF to call at Southampton, and then joined Convoy OA 169 to resime her outward voyage. OA 169 dispersed at sea, and on 1 July Volendam reached Hoboken. She landed 223 passengers, including 79 child refugees from Britain. Also aboard were the motor racer Kaye Don and his wife, the Dutch artist and cartoonist Louis Raemaekers, and a Lithuanian woman who was described as stateless because the USSR had occupied the Baltic States since 15 June. Volendam's cargo from Britain included 1,585 cases of Scotch whisky.

On 10 July Volendam left Hoboken, and two days later she reached Halifax, Nova Scotia. There she joined eastbound Convoy HX 58, which left on 15 July, and reached Liverpool on 31 July.

=== Torpedoing ===
At Liverpool, Volendam embarked 320 children from the Children's Overseas Reception Board (CORB), and 286 other passengers, 74 of the children were from Scotland. including the captain and crew of a Dutch merchant ship that had been sunk in an air attack in the English Channel several weeks earlier. The Master, Captain Arie Karlsdorp, had been wounded by machine gun fire, and had then spent five weeks in an English hospital. On 29 August Volendam left port with Convoy OB 205. Volendam carried OB 205's convoy commodore, Rear Admiral GH Knowles, DSO. OB 205 dispersed at sea the next day.

At midnight on 31 August, Volendam was in the Western Approaches at position 56°04′N 09°52′W, about 200 nautical miles (370 km) west of Bloody Foreland, County Donegal, when U-60 fired two torpedoes at her. One exploded in her number one hold, making a hole 52 by 33 feet (16 by 10 m) and flooding holds one and two. Her Master, Captain Jan Wepster, gave the order to abandon ship. All 18 lifeboats were launched. All but one of the 606 passengers, and all but a few of Volendam's 273 crew safely abandoned ship. The only fatality was the Purser, Rijk Baron. He was climbing down a rope ladder to one of the boats when a swinging pulley struck his head, knocking him unconscious. He fell into the sea and drowned.

The official account is that the children boarded the lifeboats in good spirits, singing songs such as Roll Out The Barrel. and Run, Rabbit, Run. However, one survivor, then nine years old, recalled "I remember vividly running through the corridors, watching the watertight doors begin to close. I was terrified I'd be left behind, stuck down there, all alone. The alarms were deafening and an attendant told us to grab what we could and go up on deck to our boat stations. On deck, it was dark and windy and the ship was listing."

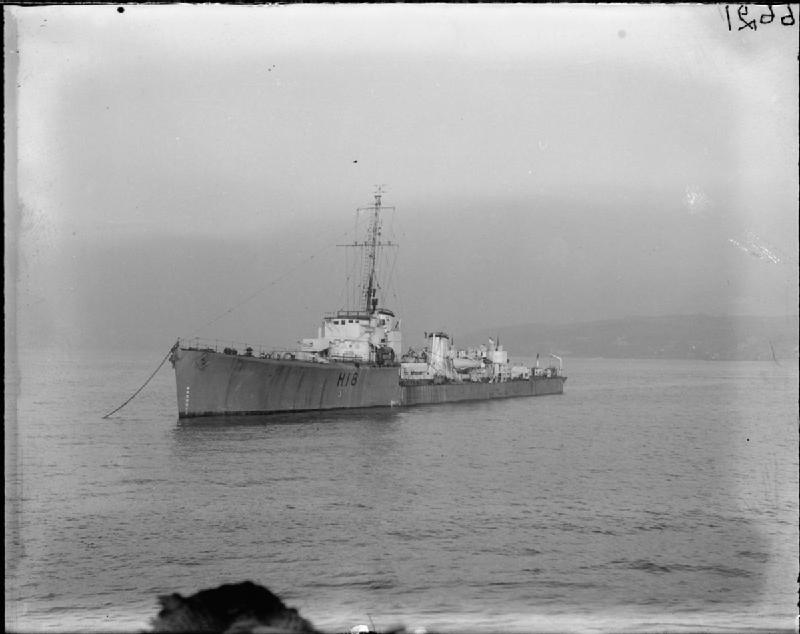
HMS Sabre, which rescued 32 of Volendam's survivors

Four ships rescued survivors. Three had been members of OB 205: the British cargo ship Bassethound, British tanker Valldemosa, and Norwegian motor ship Olaf Fostenes. The fourth was the destroyer HMS Sabre, which rescued 32 people from one boat, including a number of children. Survivors were landed at Gourock in Renfrewshire.

Volendam listed, but stayed afloat. A skeleton crew of engineers remained aboard her when everyone else abandoned ship, to see if they could save her. One Glaswegian child, named only as "Robert", slept through the abandonment of the ship. He woke some time after midnight, came up on deck, saw all the lifeboats had been launched, and went back to bed. In the morning he woke again, found Volendam's list had increased, and found a piece of the torpedo, which he kept. By then, two Royal Navy destroyers were approaching. The engineers then discovered Robert, and assured him he would be rescued.

A rescue tug, HMS Salvonia, towed Volendam to the Isle of Bute, where the liner was beached. U-60's other torpedo was found embedded in her bow, unexploded. Some sources claim that it did not explode, because the explosion of the first torpedo blew off its warhead.

Robert was landed at Greenock in Renfrewshire, and reunited with his father at Gourock. There Geoffrey Shakespeare, Chairman of the CORB, met Robert's father and persuaded him to keep secret the fact that the evacuation of the ship had left Robert behind.

=== Aftermath ===
On 13 September, CORB sent some of the children from Volendam abroad again, this time aboard City of Benares. A U-boat sank her on 17 September with the loss of 258 people, including 77 children. Two of the children killed were survivors from Volendam.

A few weeks later, Baron's body was washed up on the Inner Hebridean islet of Gunna, and was buried in Kirkapol parish churchyard on Tiree. He has since been reburied in the Dutch war graves section of Mill Hill Cemetery in north London.

After Benares was sunk on 17 September, UK Prime Minister Winston Churchill terminated CORB evacuations. However, some UK families continued to send or take their children abroad privately. On 5 October, the Furness, Withy refrigerated cargo liner Northern Prince, embarked 100 passengers in Liverpool, including 24 children. Nine of her passengers were survivors from Volendam. She reached New York on 16 October. Another child survivor from Volendam, 13-year-old John Hassell, later travelled from England to Canada via Aruba and New York. He went by ship from England to Aruba, where he joined the Grace Line steamship Santa Rosa, which reached New York on 4 April 1941.

On 4 January 1941 the Dutch government-in-exile announced that Captain Karlsdorp, who had been a passenger aboard Volendam, would be awarded the Bronze Cross for his part in the rescue.

== Troop ship ==
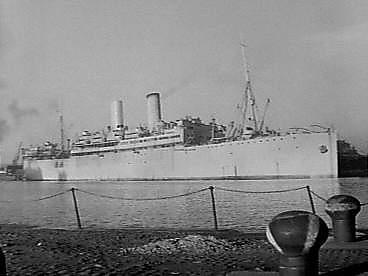
Volendam as a troop ship in 1944

Volendam was refloated, and on 14 April 1941 she was towed from Bute. The next day she reached Birkenhead, where Cammell, Laird repaired her and fitted her out as a troop ship with capacity for 3,000 troops. On 5 July she left the River Mersey for the Firth of Clyde. On 8 July she left the Clyde under naval escort for Allied-occupied Iceland, where the US Task Force 19 was about to relieve the Canadian Z Force. She was in Iceland on 11–12 July, and got back to the Clyde on 15 July.

Volendam spent much of the next three years trooping between the North Atlantic, South Africa, and the Indian Ocean. In August 1941 she sailed from the Clyde to Suez, Egypt, travelling ins Convoy WS 10 and WS 10B via Freetown, Sierra Leone as far as Cape Town. She was in Suez on 30–31 September, and then went to via Berbera in British Somaliland, Durban, Lagos in Nigeria and Takoradi on the Gold Coast to Freetown. There she joined Convoy SL 94, which left on 30 November for Liverpool. Volendam detached in home waters, and reached Belfast on 17 December 1941.

Volendam was in Avonmouth from 21 December 1941 to 7 January 1942. She then went to Milford Haven, where she and the Canadian Pacific liner Montcalm formed Convoy CT 9 to Halifax, Nova Scotia. She was in Halifax 15–30 January, and returned with Convoy NA 2, which reached the Clyde on 8 February.

On 16 February 1942 Volendam left the Clyde with Convoy WS 16, which took her as far as Freetown. There she and the troop ships Bergensfjord and Nea Hellas, escorted by the cruiser HMS Colombo, formed Convoy WS 16A, which dispersed off Aden on 16 April. Volendam was in Suez 10–13 April, and then returned via Cape Town, Freetown and Convoy SL 112 to Liverpool.

Volendam was in Liverpool 23–28 June 1942, and then joined Convoy WS 21, which left the Clyde the next day. WS 21 went via Freetown as far as Durban, and Volendam continued under escort to Mombasa in Kenya, where she was in port 13–15 September. She then called at Diego-Suárez on 18–19 September, where Operation Stream Line Jane had been launched to complete the Allied invasion of Vichy French Madagascar. She returned via Durban, Cape Town, Freetown and Convoy CF 7A to Liverpool, where she was in port 17–27 November 1942.

=== Mediterranean service ===
The Mediterranean was now added to Volendam's area of operation. On 27 November she left Liverpool with Convoy KMF 4 to Bône in Algeria, where she was in port 6–11 December. She returned to with Convoy MKF 4Y, and was in Liverpool again from 24 December 1942 to 20 January 1943.

On 20 January 1943 Volendam left Liverpool to join Convoy WS 26. This left the Clyde on 24 January and went via Freetown to Durban, where Volendam was in port from 25 February to 6 March. She returned unescorted as far as Freetown, where she joined Convoy SL 127 to Liverpool, where she was in port from 23 April until 21 June.

On 22 June 1943 Volendam arrived in the Firth of Clyde. From there the destroyers HMS Sardonyx and Saladin escorted her to Iceland and back. She got back to the Clyde on 13 July.

On 19 July 1942 Volendam left the Clyde with Convoy KMF 20. She called at Algiers and Philippeville, then returned with Convoy MKF 20 to the Clyde, where she was in port from 11 August until 10 September.

Volendam then called at Liverpool, and on 15 September joined Convoy KMF 24. The convoy was bound for Alexandria, but Volendam detached for Algiers, where she was in port 23–29 September. She then joined the return Convoy MKF 24, but detached at Gibraltar for Convoy RS 10, which reached Freetown on 7 October. She returned with Convoy SR 6 to Gibraltar, which left Freetown on 14 October. At Gibraltar she joined Convoy KMF 25, which had started from Liverpool, and which reached Alexandria on 30 October. Volendam continued through the Suez Canal, and joined Convoy AB 20F at Aden. This took her to Bombay, where she was in port 17–25 November. She then returned unescorted via the Suez Canal to Port Said, where she joined Convoy XIF 6 to Taranto in Italy. She then returned via Convoys XIF 6A and MKF 27 to the Clyde, where she arrived on 4 January 1944.

Volendam was in Liverpool from 17 January to 20 February 1944, and then joined Convoy KMF 29 from the Clyde to Oran, where she was in port 1–11 March. She then called at Naples, Port Said, and again at Naples, Oran and Port Said, before going through the Suez Canal to Aden. There she joined Convoy AB 38A to Bombay, where she was in port from 25 April to 3 May. She returned via Convoy BA 69A as far as Aden, and then through the Suez Canal to Port Said, where she joined Convoy MKF 31, which left on 15 May, and reached Liverpool on 29 May.

Volendam was in Belfast 8–15 July 1944, embarked 3,048 troops, and then joined Convoy KMF 33. This was bound for Port Said, but Volendam detached for Naples, and then called at Augusta, Sicily. She was in port in Taranto 1–12 August, where she embarked 2,803 troops for Convoy TF 1, which was part of Operation Dragoon. She continued to operate between Algeria, southern France, and Naples until 17 October, when she left Algiers carrying 2,673 passengers and joined Convoy MKF 35 to Liverpool. Volendam detached for the Clyde. At some point in October 1944, an Italian prisoner of war fell overboard and was drowned.

On 29 October 1944 Volendam left Liverpool with Convoy UC 43A, which reached New York on 9 November. There she spent 45 days under repair. She embarked troops, and then on 26 December left New York with Convoy CU 52, which reached Liverpool on 7 January 1945.

Volendam embarked 2,436 troops and joined Convoy KMF 39, which left the Clyde on 28 January and took her as far as Gibraltar. From there she continued unescorted via Malta to Port Said, where she was in port 10–14 February. She made a round trip from Port Said to Taranto and back, was in Port Said again 22–27 February, and then returned via Gibraltar, where she joined Convoy MKF 40. The convoy was headed for Liverpool, but Volendam detached for the Clyde, where she was from 12 March to 16 April 1945.

Volendam left the Clyde with Convoy UC 64A. The convoy was bound for New York, but Volendam detached for Halifax, where she was in port from 27 April to 3 May. She returned with Convoy CU 68, which had started from New York, and reached Liverpool on 14 May, where Volendam spent 11 days being repaired.

Volendam embarked 2,100 troops, and on 29 May 1945 left Liverpool with Convoy UC 70A. The convoy was bound for New York, but Volendam detached for Halifax. Germany had surrendered on 8 May, so from now on Volendam sailed unescorted. She sailed to Liverpool, Naples, and Belfast, and by July 1945 she had carried more than 100,000 troops. She then returned to Rotterdam for the first time for more than five years. She was there from 27 July until 13 September, being partly reconditioned.

Volendam then sailed to Liverpool, where she was in port from 15 September to 7 October. She embarked troops including the 3rd Battalion, the Coldstream Guards, whom she landed in Haifa on 18 October to combat the Jewish insurgency in Mandatory Palestine. She spent the rest of 1945 in the Mediterranean, calling at Alexandria, Toulon, Malta and Port Said. She was in Toulon on 31 December 1945. On 23 February 1946, Volendam left Port Said carrying British service personnel: mostly ATS, WAAF and married families. She called at Valletta and Naples, and reached King George V Dock, Glasgow on 7 March.

== Post-war Dutch service ==
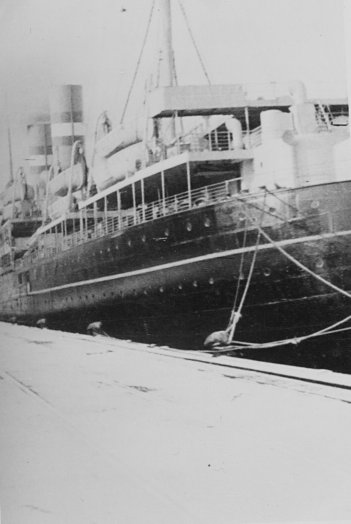
Volendam in Bremerhaven in February 1947 to embark Russian Mennonite emigrants to Paraguay

From 27 May 1946, the Dutch government chartered Volendam as a troop ship for the Dutch East Indies. In February 1947 she carried Dutch emigrants to Australia. She was then refitted as an emigrant ship, with dormitory berths for 1,500 passengers, all of one class. On one voyage she carried 2,307 Russian Mennonite emigrants from Bremerhaven to Buenos Aires. They joined the Mennonites in Paraguay, founded a settlement, and named it "Colonia Volendam" after the ship.

In June 1948, Volendam began sailing between Rotterdam and Quebec, and on 2 September 1948, Volendam returned to her Rotterdam – Hoboken route for the first time in more than eight years. She was carrying 1,412 US and Canadian students and teachers who had spent their summer vacation in Europe. On 11 September, when Volendam was 200 nautical miles (370 km) off the East Coast of the United States, a student from Occidental College, Los Angeles fell into the sea from a lifeboat where he had been posing for photographs. The ship stopped, and he was rescued. The ship reached Hoboken the next day.

On a similar voyage in September 1949, Volendam brought 1,393 US and Canadian students to Hoboken, on their way home from vacation in Europe. Then, in October, it carried a contingent of over 700 Mennonites from West Prussia to Montevideo, Uruguay.

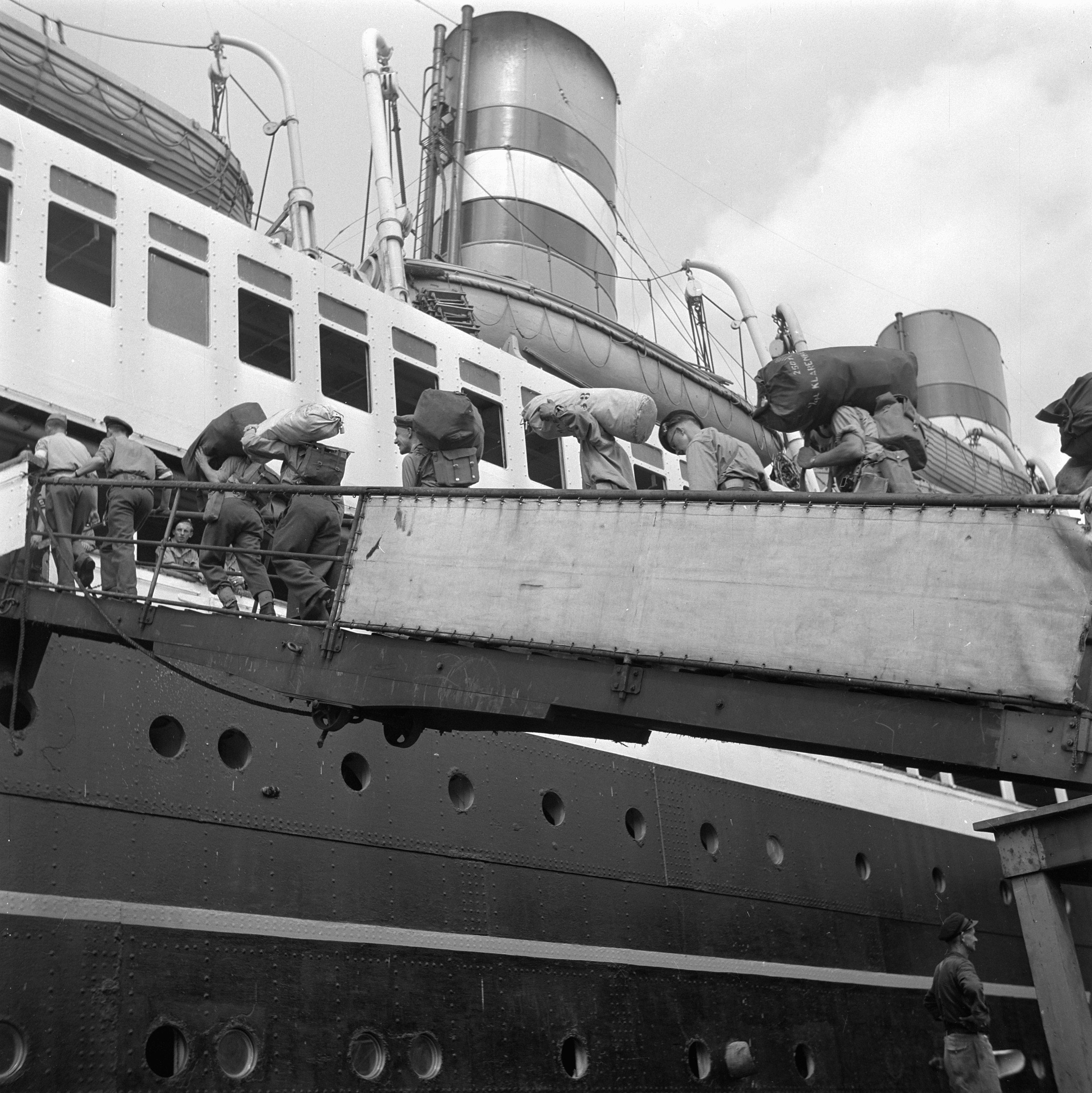
Volendam embarking Dutch troops in July 1947

On 25 February 1951, Volendam reached Hoboken from Rotterdam, carrying only 58 passengers. A fortnight later NASM announced that she would make six transatlantic round trips, at monthly intervals, from March to September 1951. One-way fares were $145 for a dormitory berth, or $155 in a multiple-berth cabin. Round-trip fares would be $300 for a dormitory, or $320 in a multiple-berth cabin. Five of the sailings would be between Rotterdam and Hoboken. The exception would be in June, when she would sail to Quebec to embark students going to spend their summer in Europe.

The Hoboken voyages seem not to have taken place. However, Volendam embarked about 950 students at Montreal on 26 June, and landed them at Rotterdam on 8 July. She re-embarked the students at Rotterdam on 5 September, called at Le Havre the next day, and then took them home across the Atlantic. She made a final crossing from Rotterdam to Quebec in October 1951.

From 13 November 1951, the ship was laid up in Rotterdam. She was sold for scrap to Frank Rijsdijk's Industrieële Ondernemingen for a sum estimated to be the equivalent of US$1 million. Sources disagree as to whether the sale was at the beginning of November 1951 or on 3 February 1952, and whether her voyage to the breakers' yard in 1952 was on 17 March or 6 June. She was broken up in Hendrik-Ido-Ambacht.

== Bibliography ==
- Bonsor, NRP (1975). North Atlantic Seaway. Vol. 3. Brookside. ISBN 978-0-668-03679-5.
- Fasick, Adele (2013). Glimpses of Postwar Europe—1951 (PDF). Wordpress.
- Haws, Duncan (1995). Holland America Line. Merchant Fleets series. Vol. 28. Uckfield: Travel Creatours Ltd Publications. ISBN 0946378258.
- Heiligman, Deborah (2019). Torpedoed: The True Story of the World War II Sinking of "The Children's Ship". New York, NY: Henry Holt and Company. ISBN 978-1-250-18755-0.
- Lloyd's Register of Shipping. Vol. II.–Steamers and Motorships. London: Lloyd's Register of Shipping. 1924 – via Internet Archive.
- Lloyd's Register of Shipping (PDF). Vol. II.–Steamers and Motorships of 300 Tons Gross and Over. London: Lloyd's Register of Shipping. 1930 – via Southampton City Council.
- Lloyd's Register of Shipping (PDF). Vol. II.–Steamers and Motorships of 300 Tons Gross and Over. London: Lloyd's Register of Shipping. 1934 – via Southampton City Council.
- Lloyd's Register of Shipping. Vol. Steamers and Motorships of 300 Tons Gross and Over, etc. London: Lloyd's Register of Shipping. 1946 – via Internet Archive.
- McCluskie, Tom (2013). The Rise and Fall of Harland and Wolff. Stroud: The History Press. ISBN 978-0752488615.
- Mann, Jessica (2005). Out of Harm's Way; The Wartime Evacuation of Children from Britain. London: Headline Publishing Group. ISBN 0-7553-1138-8.
- Mann, Thomas (1956). Meerfahrt mit Don Quijote. Mit einer Übersicht und Photographien von sämtlichen Atlantikreisen Thomas Manns (in German). Berlin: Insel. ISBN 3-10-048513-0.
- Starns, Penny (2014). Oceans Apart: Stories of Overseas Evacuees in World War Two. Stroud: The History Press. ISBN 978-07524-9011-3.
