= Aufhäuser =

Aufhäuser is a surname. Notable people with the name include:

- David Aufhauser (born 19..), American lawyer,General Counsel of the United States Department of the Treasury
- Martin Aufhäuser (1875–1944), German banker
- Michael Aufhauser (born 1952), German animal rights activist
- René Aufhauser (born 1976), Austrian footballer and football coach
- Siegfried Aufhäuser, (1884–1964), German politician and union leader
