= SS Corcovado =

German-built ocean liner

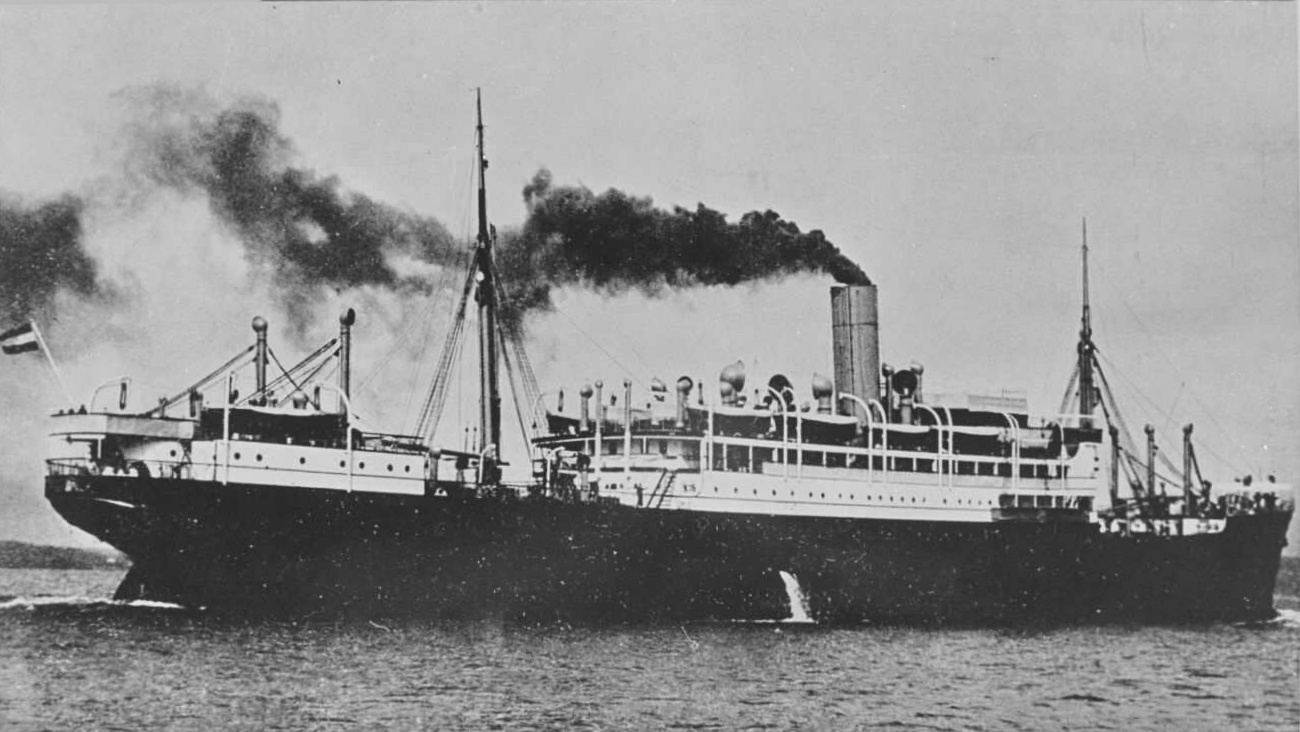
- Corcovado

History
- Name: 1908: Corcovado; 1917: Sueh; 1919: Corcovado; 1920: Guglielmo Peirce; 1927: Maria Cristina; 1930: Mouzinho
- Namesake: 1908: Corcovado
- Owner: 1908: Hamburg America Line; 1919: French Government; 1920: Soc Sicula Americana; 1927: Lloyd Sabaudo; 1930: Cia Colonial de Nav
- Operator: 1914: Imperial German Navy; 1917: Ottoman government; 1926: Cosulich Line
- Port of registry: 1908: (German Empire) Hamburg; 1920: (Kingdom of Italy) Naples; 1930: (Portugal) Luanda
- Route: 1908: Hamburg – Rio de Janeiro; 1910: Hamburg – Buenos Aires; 1912: Hamburg – New York; 1914: Odesa – New York; 1920: Naples – New York; 1926: Italy – Buenos Aires; 1927: Genoa – Buenos Aires; 1928: Genoa – Brisbane; 1930: Lisbon – Beira
- Builder: F Krupp Germaniawerft, Kiel
- Yard number: 133
- Launched: 21 December 1907
- Completed: 1 April 1908
- Identification: 1908: code letters RPVG; call sign DRC; 1920: code letters NTCG; 1930: code letters LDBJ; 1934: call sign CSDW
- Fate: scrapped 1954

General characteristics
- Type: cargo liner
- Tonnage: 7,976 GRT, 4,951 NRT
- Length: 448.3 ft (136.6 m)
- Beam: 55.2 ft (16.8 m)
- Draught: 25 ft 11 in (7.90 m)
- Depth: 28.1 ft (8.6 m)
- Decks: 2
- Installed power: 592 NHP, 4,000 ihp
- Propulsion: 2 × quadruple-expansion engines; 2 × screws
- Speed: 13 1/2 knots (25 km/h)
- Capacity: passengers: 1908: 140 × 1st class, 110 × 2nd class, 1,100 × steerage; 1928: 56 × 1st class, 943 × steerage
- Crew: 136
- Sensors & processing systems: by 1911: submarine signalling; by 1924: wireless direction finding
- Notes: sister ship: Ypiranga

SS Corcovado was a cargo liner that was launched in Germany in 1907 for the Hamburg America Line (HAPAG). In 1917 she was transferred to the Ottoman government and renamed Sueh. In 1919 the Ottomans surrendered her to France, and her name reverted to Corcovado. In 1920 the Società Sicula Americana bought her and renamed her Guglielmo Peirce. In 1927 Lloyd Sabaudo bought her and renamed her Maria Cristina. In 1930 the Companhia Colonial de Navegação (CCN) bought her and renamed her Mouzinho. She was scrapped in Italy in 1954.

In her HAPAG career Corcovado served various transatlantic routes between Europe and both South and North America. In the First World War she was the barracks ship Sueh in Turkey and a troopship in the Black Sea. As Guglielmo Peirce she took European emigrants from Italy to both South and North America. As Maria Cristina she took European emigrants from Italy to Australia.

The longest part of her career was with CCN as Mouzinho. Her regular route linked Portugal with its colonies in Africa. In 1941 she made two voyages from Portugal to the US, on which she carried a total of 1,346 refugees, many of them Jewish, who had escaped from German-occupied Europe.

== Building ==
In 1908 Friedrich Krupp Germaniawerft in Kiel completed a pair of sister ships for HAPAG. Yard number 133 was launched on 21 December 1907 as Corcovado and completed in April 1908. Yard number 134 was launched on 3 May 1908 as Ypiranga and completed on 8 August. HAPAG gave both ships Brazilian names, as they were built for a service to Brazil.

Corcovado's registered length was 448.3 ft (136.6 m), her beam was 55.2 ft (16.8 m), and her depth was 28.1 ft (8.6 m). Her tonnages were 7,976 GRT and 4,951 NRT. As built, she had berths for 1,350 passengers: 140 in first class; 110 in second class; and 1,100 in steerage.

Corcovado had twin screws, each driven by a quadruple-expansion steam engine. The combined power of her twin engines was 592 NHP or 4,000 ihp, and gave her a speed of 13 1/2 knots (25 km/h).

== Corcovado and Sueh ==
HAPAG registered Corcovado in Hamburg. Her code letters were RPVG.

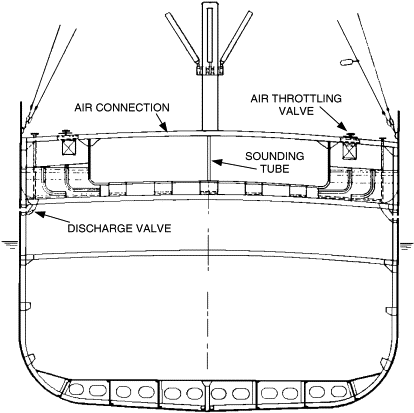
Cross-section of Ypiranga, showing her antiroll tanks

Early in their career, Ypiranga and Corcovado were found to roll badly. By 1911 Ypiranga had been remedied by installing two antiroll tanks near her foremast and her mainmast, linked by a flying bridge. The flow of water between the tanks, controlled by regulating the movement of the air in the side branches, steadied her in rough seas. After this modification, Ypiranga was reputed to be particularly stable. Corcovado was then similarly modified.

Also by 1911, Corcovado was equipped with wireless telegraphy and submarine signalling. By 1913 her wireless call sign was DRC.

In October 1912 HAPAG transferred Corcovado to its route between Hamburg and New York. In March 1914 she made a voyage from Hamburg to Philadelphia.

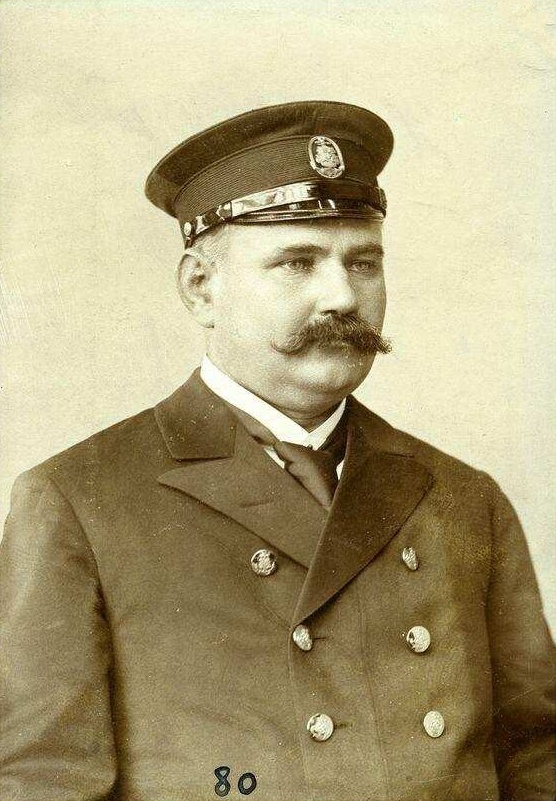
Captain H Looft was Master of Corcovado by 1911, and remained in command until at least 1914.

In April 1914 HAPAG transferred Corcovado to a new service between Odesa and New York. The route was via Batumi, Istanbul, Smyrna, and Piraeus. On 27 May a banquet for to promote the service was held aboard Corcovado in Istanbul, at which US Ambassador Henry Morgenthau addressed 100 guests.

On 26 July Corcovado reached Odesa at the end of her third round trip to and from New York. At 11:00 hrs on 1 August 1914, with the First World War imminent, HAPAG announced the suspension of its shipping services. Corcovado was in Ottoman waters, and took refuge in either Bandırma or Istanbul (sources differ).

On 5 August the Imperial German Navy requisitioned Corcovado at Istanbul as a barracks ship. At the end of October 1914 the Ottoman Empire joined the war on the side of the Central Powers. Some time between 1915 and 1917 HAPAG transferred her to the Ottoman government, who renamed her Sueh. In 1918 she carried German troops in the Black Sea, calling at Sevastopol at the end of May, and Odesa on an unknown date. When she was in Odesa, Corcovado was the name she carried on her bow.

At the end of October 1918 the Armistice of Mudros ended the war between the Ottoman Empire and the Entente Powers. In 1919 the Ottoman government surrendered Sueh to France, which reverted her name to Corcovado.

== Guglielmo Peirce ==
In 1920 the Società Sicula Americana (Sicilian American Company) bought Corcovado, and renamed her Guglielmo Peirce after its founder. She was registered at Naples, and her code letters were NTCG. Sicular Americana ran her at first between Naples and South America, and then between Naples and New York. The songwriter Ernesto De Curtis traveled on her first voyage on the latter route. She left Naples on 9 December 1920, and reached West 57th Street on the North River on 26 December.

On 3 July 1922, as Guglielmo Peirce was approaching Pier 95 on the Hudson River in New York, one of her steerage passengers was wounded by a bullet. The assailant was never found. The victim survived, and was transferred to the hospital on Ellis Island.

On 14 October 1922, Guglielmo Peirce reached New York carrying 956 passengers and two stowaways. One was an Italian American returning to Easton, Pennsylvania. The other was an Anatolian Greek whom the destroyer USS Litchfield had rescued from the burning of Smyrna. An Italian steamship had taken the Greek as far as Brindisi. He had then stowed away aboard Guglielmo Peirce from Naples. Both men were landed on Ellis Island with the ship's 674 steerage passengers.

The Emergency Quota Act of 1921 restricted migration into the US from Southern and Eastern Europe. In November 1923 Guglielmo Peirce made her fourteenth voyage to and from New York, after which Sicula Americana laid her up. By 1924 Guglielmo Peirce was equipped with wireless direction finding. In 1926 Cosulich Line chartered her. She made at least two voyages taking emigrants from Italy to Argentina, reaching at Buenos Aires on 2 May and 7 November.

== Maria Cristina ==
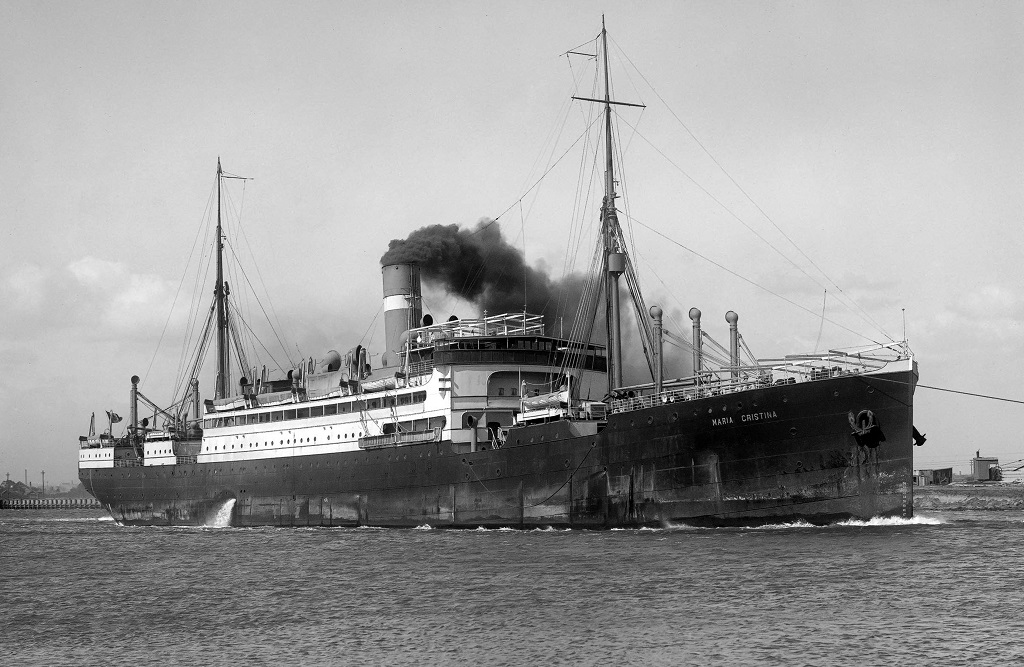
The ship as Maria Cristina

In 1927 Lloyd Sabaudo bought Guglielmo Peirce and renamed her Maria Cristina. Lloyd Sabaudo routes linked Italy with New York, Buenos Aires, and Australia. Maria Cristina at first worked the route to South America.

In January 1928 Lloyd Sabaudo and Navigazione Generale Italiana announced that they would jointly run an improved service to Australia, and that Maria Cristina would join the route on 17 April. Her route would be between Genoa and Brisbane via Fremantle, Adelaide, Melbourne, and Sydney. By 1928 Maria Cristina had berths for 999 passengers: 56 in first class and 943 in steerage.

Early on 20 May Maria Cristina reached Victoria Quay, Fremantle. Her passengers included 381 in steerage, about a third of whom disembarked to settle in Western Australia. One of the disembarking passengers wore National Fascist Party insignia. Some of the Italians waiting on the quay to meet the ship made "vehement threats" against him, and the police were called.

As Maria Cristina continued east, her main steering gear was damaged. She reached Adelaide on 26 May with her helmsman using the auxiliary steering wheel on her poop, but as a precaution she was not allowed to enter the Port River, and she docked instead at a quay in the Outer Harbour. Repairs in port were expected to take about 12 hours. 38 of her passengers disembarked at Adelaide: 27 Italians, six Yugoslavs and five Greeks.

On 28 May Maria Cristina reached Victoria Dock, Melbourne. There she disembarked 56 passengers, including 47 steerage. On 1 June she reached Circular Quay, Sydney, where she disembarked 49 passengers and discharged general cargo. 122 passengers remained aboard for Brisbane, where she arrived on 8 June. Days later Maria Cristina began her return voyage to Genoa. She called at Sydney on 15 June, and her cargo to Italy included wool as well as general cargo.

Maria Cristina continued to bring migrants from southern Europe to Australia. One such voyage from Genoa began on 8 January 1929. On 12 February she reached Fremantle, where 74 Albanian migrants disembarked. Other migrants on the same voyage included 10 Italians bound for Adelaide, 20 Greeks and 20 Italians for Melbourne, 10 Greeks and 15 Italians for Sydney, and 71 Italians for Brisbane.

In November 1929 Lloyd Sabaudo announced that it was selling the ship to Companhia Colonial de Navegação (CCN) for £70,000. She continued with Lloyd Sabaudo for another few months, and made her final visit to Australia in March 1930.

== Mouzinho ==
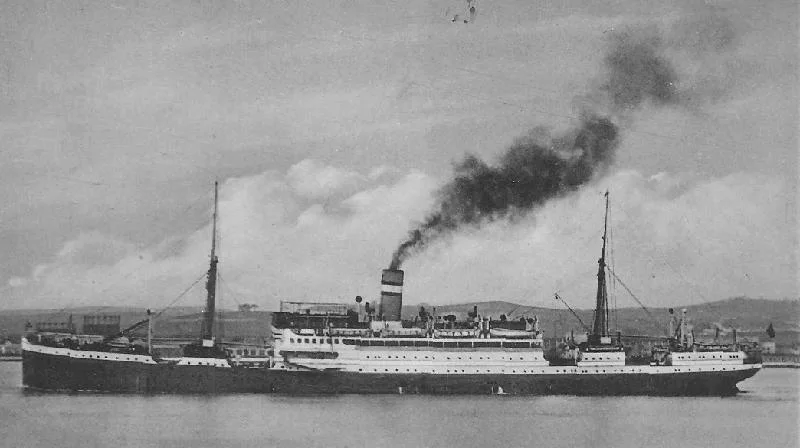
The ship as Mouzinho

CCN renamed the ship Mouzinho and registered her in Luanda in Angola. Her code letters were LDBJ. By 1934 her wireless call sign was CSDW, and this had superseded her code letters.

The change of ownership reunited Mouzinho with her sister ship, the former Ypiranga, which CCN had bought from Anchor Line in 1929 and renamed Colonial. CCN put both sisters on the same route, which was between Lisbon in Portugal and Beira in Moçambique. Ports of call en route were Funchal, São Tomé, Sazaire, Luanda, Porto Amboim, Lobito, Moçâmedes, Lourenço Marques (now Maputo), and the Island of Mozambique.

In the Second World War Portugal was neutral. In 1940 Mouzinho maintained her peacetime route. In May 1941 she took nearly 1,000 Portuguese troops to garrison Cape Verde.

On 10 June 1941 Mouzinho left Lisbon carrying 721 refugees from Europe to the USA. Dormitories with bunk beds had been improvised in her cargo holds. On 21 June she reached Pier 8 on Staten Island, New York, where a team of 30 American Red Cross volunteers met the refugees as they disambarked.

The refugees included 101 children brought by the United States Committee for the Care of European Children (USCOM); a group of eight orphaned children from Germany and Austria whose parents had died in Nazi concentration camps; and ten children who were travelling individually. Nine of the 119 children were sent to Ellis Island, in most cases because of illness. Some of the adult refugees were also held on Ellis Island.

USCOM had rescued the children in cooperation with the Œuvre de secours aux enfants (OSE) in Vichy France; the American Friends Service Committee (AFSC); HIAS; and the American Jewish Joint Distribution Committee (JDC). The JDC paid their fares. They were rescued from Austria, Belgium, Czechoslovakia, Germany, Poland, and Romania. The OSE had gathered them in Marseille, and the AFSC and JDC had helped to get them by train to Lisbon. Many of the children left behind parents in the Gurs internment camp in France.

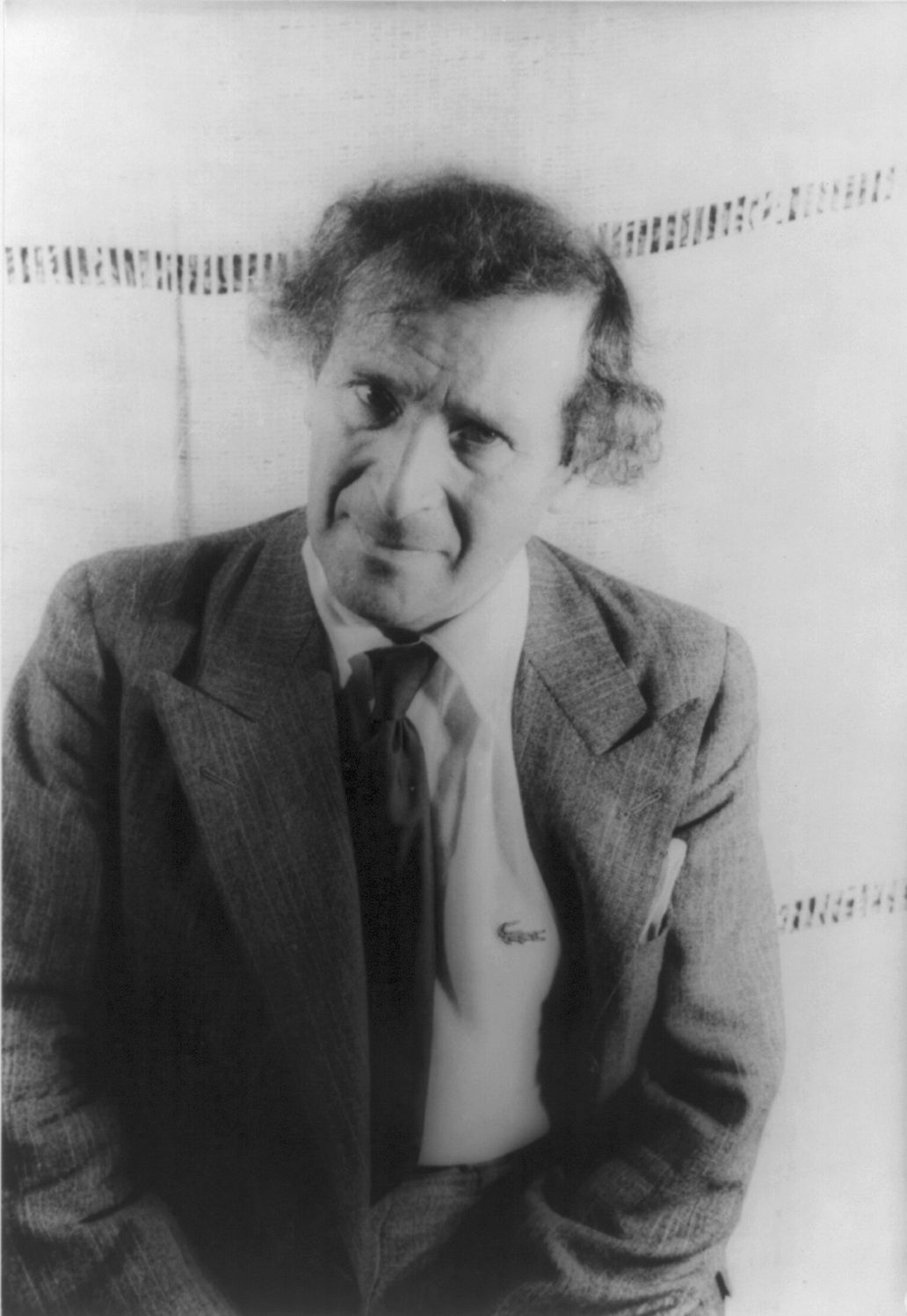
Marc Chagall in 1941

Mouzinho's adult refugees included 26 Christian women missionaries who had survived the sinking of Zamzam in the South Atlantic by the German auxiliary cruiser Atlantis two months previously. Many of Mouzinho's refugees were Jewish. They included the artist Marc Chagall and his wife Bella Rosenfeld; Robert Serebrenik, Grand Rabbi of Luxembourg; Maximilian Weinberger, former head of the Rothschild Hospital in Vienna; the German actor and theatre director Ewald Schindler and his wife; and the banker Martin Aufhäuser.

Three days after the ship left Lisbon, a Polish refugee aboard gave birth to a baby boy. She was travelling with her husband, who had served in the Polish Army in France. Three stowaways were found aboard. They were surrendered to the US Immigration and Naturalization Service on arrival in New York.

On 31 May 1941 a German U-boat sank the Clan Line motor ship Clan MacDougall north of Cape Verde. On 1 June the Portuguese ship Tarrafal found 85 survivors in four lifeboats 10 nautical miles (19 km) off Santo Antão, Cape Verde. Tarrafal rescued them and landed them on São Vicente. On 25 July Mouzinho called at São Vicente, where she embarked some of the survivors to take them to Bathurst (now Banjul) in Gambia. Other survivors remained on São Vicente until 21 August, when they embarked on her sister ship Colonial to go to Cape Town in South Africa.

On 20 August 1941 Mouzinho left Lisbon carrying another 625 refugees, including 45 children. She arrived off New York on 1 September, which was Labor Day, so she had to wait until the next day to dock at Pier 8 on Staten Island.

By August 1942 Mouzinho had returned to serving Portugal's colonies in Africa. On 8 August she was in Lourenço Marques, where two former US consuls from Saigon in French Indochina (now Ho Chi Minh City in Vietnam) and Osaka in Japan embarked on her to take up new posts in West Africa.

On 27 August 1942 a U-boat sank another Clan Line ship, Clan Macwhirter. On 31 August the Portuguese Navy aviso NRP Pedro Nunes rescued 67 survivors and landed them at Funchal on Madeira. From there the survivors were taken to Lisbon, where they arrived by the beginning of October. 50 of the crew were lascars, and Mouzinho repatriated them to India.

On 29 September 1942 a U-boat sank the British steamship Baron Ogilvy off the coast of Liberia. On the afternoon of 5 October Mouzinho, steaming from Funchal to the island of São Tomé, found 32 survivors in one lifeboat. She landed them at Cape Town on 21 October.

Mouzinho was scrapped in 1954 at Savona in Italy.

== Bibliography ==
- Haws, Duncan (1980). The Ships of the Hamburg America, Adler and Carr Lines. Merchant Fleets in Profile. Vol. 4. Cambridge: Patrick Stephens Ltd. ISBN 0-85059-397-2.
- Lloyd's Register of British and Foreign Shipping. Vol. I.–Steamers. London: Lloyd's Register of Shipping. 1908 – via Internet Archive.
- Lloyd's Register of British and Foreign Shipping. Vol. I.–Steamers. London: Lloyd's Register of Shipping. 1911 – via Internet Archive.
- Lloyd's Register of Shipping. Vol. I.–Steamers. London: Lloyd's Register of Shipping. 1914 – via Internet Archive.
- Lloyd's Register of Shipping. Vol. II.–Steamers and Motorships. London: Lloyd's Register of Shipping. 1919 – via Internet Archive.
- Lloyd's Register of Shipping. Vol. II.–Steamers. London: Lloyd's Register of Shipping. 1920 – via Internet Archive.
- Lloyd's Register of Shipping. Vol. II.–Steamers & Motor Vessels. London: Lloyd's Register of Shipping. 1922 – via Internet Archive.
- Lloyd's Register of Shipping. Vol. II.–Steamers & Motorships. London: Lloyd's Register of Shipping. 1924 – via Internet Archive.
- Lloyd's Register of Shipping. Vol. II.–Steamers and Motorships. London: Lloyd's Register of Shipping. 1928 – via Internet Archive.
- Lloyd's Register of Shipping (PDF). Vol. II.–Steamers and Motorships of 300 tons gross and over. London: Lloyd's Register of Shipping. 1930 – via Southampton City Council.
- Lloyd's Register of Shipping (PDF). Vol. II.–Steamers and Motorships of 300 tons gross and over. London: Lloyd's Register of Shipping. 1934 – via Southampton City Council.
- Register Book. Vol. II M–Z. London: Lloyd's Register of Shipping. 1954 – via Internet Archive.
- Rothe, Klaus (1986). Deutsche Ozean-Passagierschiffe 1896 bis 1918. Bibliothek der Schiffstypen (in German). Berlin: VEB Verlag für Verkehrswesen. ISBN 3-344-00059-4.
- The Marconi Press Agency Ltd (1913). The Year Book of Wireless Telegraphy and Telephony. London: The St Katherine Press.
