= SS Augsburg =

Cargo steamship that vanished in 1912

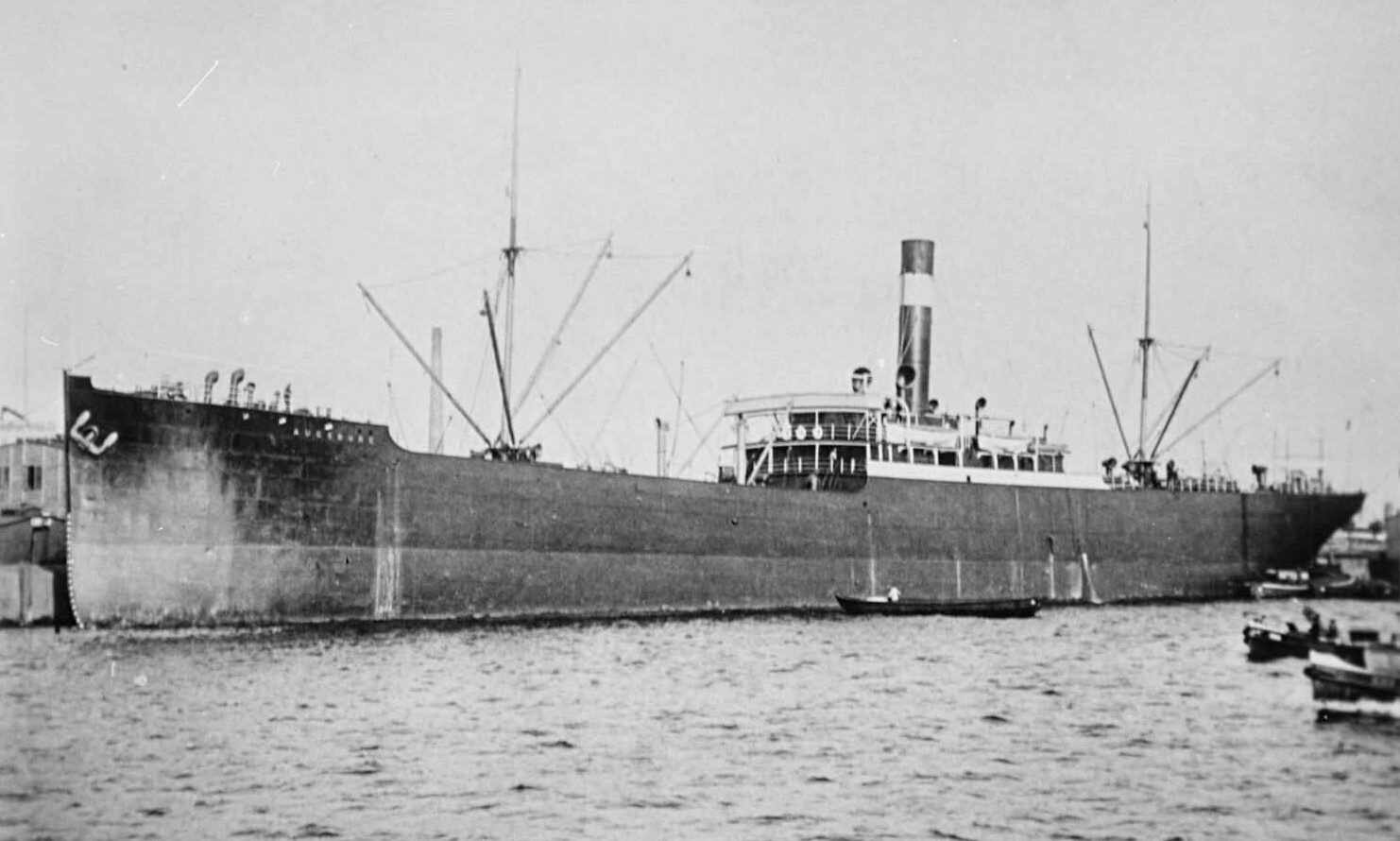
- Augsburg in port

History

Germany
- Name: Augsburg
- Namesake: Augsburg
- Owner: Deutsch-Australische DG
- Port of registry: Hamburg
- Ordered: 18 October 1895
- Builder: Charles Connell & Co, Scotstoun
- Cost: 790,000 marks
- Yard number: 226
- Launched: 18 April 1896
- Completed: 27 June 1896
- Identification: code letters RKLN
- Fate: disappeared February 1912

General characteristics
- Type: Cargo ship
- Tonnage: 4,287 GRT, 2,763 NRT, 6,500 DWT
- Length: 380.5 ft (116.0 m)
- Beam: 46.6 ft (14.2 m)
- Depth: 20.3 ft (6.2 m)
- Decks: 1
- Installed power: 446 NHP, 2,000 ihp (1,500 kW)
- Propulsion: 1 × triple-expansion engine; 1 × screw
- Speed: 11 knots (20 km/h; 13 mph)
- Crew: 39

SS Augsburg was a cargo steamship that was built in Scotland in 1896 for the Deutsch-Australische Dampfschiffs-Gesellschaft (DADG). She disappeared in the North Atlantic in 1912 on a voyage from New York to Java via Durban. Several ships searched for her, but no trace was ever found.

== Building ==
DADG usually ordered new ships from the Flensburger Schiffbau-Gesellschaft in Germany. However, it occasionally ordered from UK shipyards instead. On 18 October 1895 it ordered one ship from Charles Connell and Company of Scotstoun, on the River Clyde in Glasgow. She was built as yard number 226, launched on 18 April 1896 as Augsburg, and completed on 27 June that year for 790,000 marks.

Augsburg's registered length was 380.5 ft (116.0 m), her beam was 46.6 ft (14.2 m), and her depth was 20.3 ft (6.2 m). Her tonnages were 4,287 gross register tons (GRT), 2,763 net register tons (NRT), and 6,500 tons deadweight (DWT). She had a single screw, driven by a three-cylinder triple-expansion engine made by David Rowan & Co of Glasgow. It was rated at 446 NHP or 2,000 indicated horsepower (1,500 kW), and gave her a speed of 11 knots (20 km/h; 13 mph).

DADG registered Augsburg at Hamburg. Her code letters were RKLN.

== Career ==
DADG operated between Hamburg and Australia, and also served the Dutch East Indies and South Africa. DADG's cargo included coconut products. Early in 1904, fire broke out in Augsburg's number 3 hold. On 3 February she put into Ferrol, Spain for help. About half of the cargo of coir, copra, and barrels of coconut oil in that hold was damaged by either the fire, or the water used to put it out. All of the contents of that hold, about 23,800 cubic feet (674 m^{3}), was discharged in Ferrol as a result.

In 1907 DADG formed a partnership called The United Tyser Line, with DDG Hansa of Bremen and Tyser Line of London. The three companies were jointly to operate a route between New York, Australia, and New Zealand.

Later in 1907 Augsburg sailed on a United Tyser Line service from New York to Sydney via the Cape of Good Hope. Storms damaged her as she crossed the Indian Ocean. At her stern her auxiliary steering wheel was smashed; an 11-foot (3-metre) length of her railing was carried away on her starboard side; and the iron stanchions of the awning on her poop were broken or bent. A derrick weighing 1,000 pounds (450 kg) was unshipped. The storm tore loose and broke open her pig sty and chicken coop, and her two pigs and dozen hens were swept overboard. On the morning of 11 October she reached Fremantle, Western Australia to discharge part of her cargo, before continuing to Sydney.

== Loss and search ==
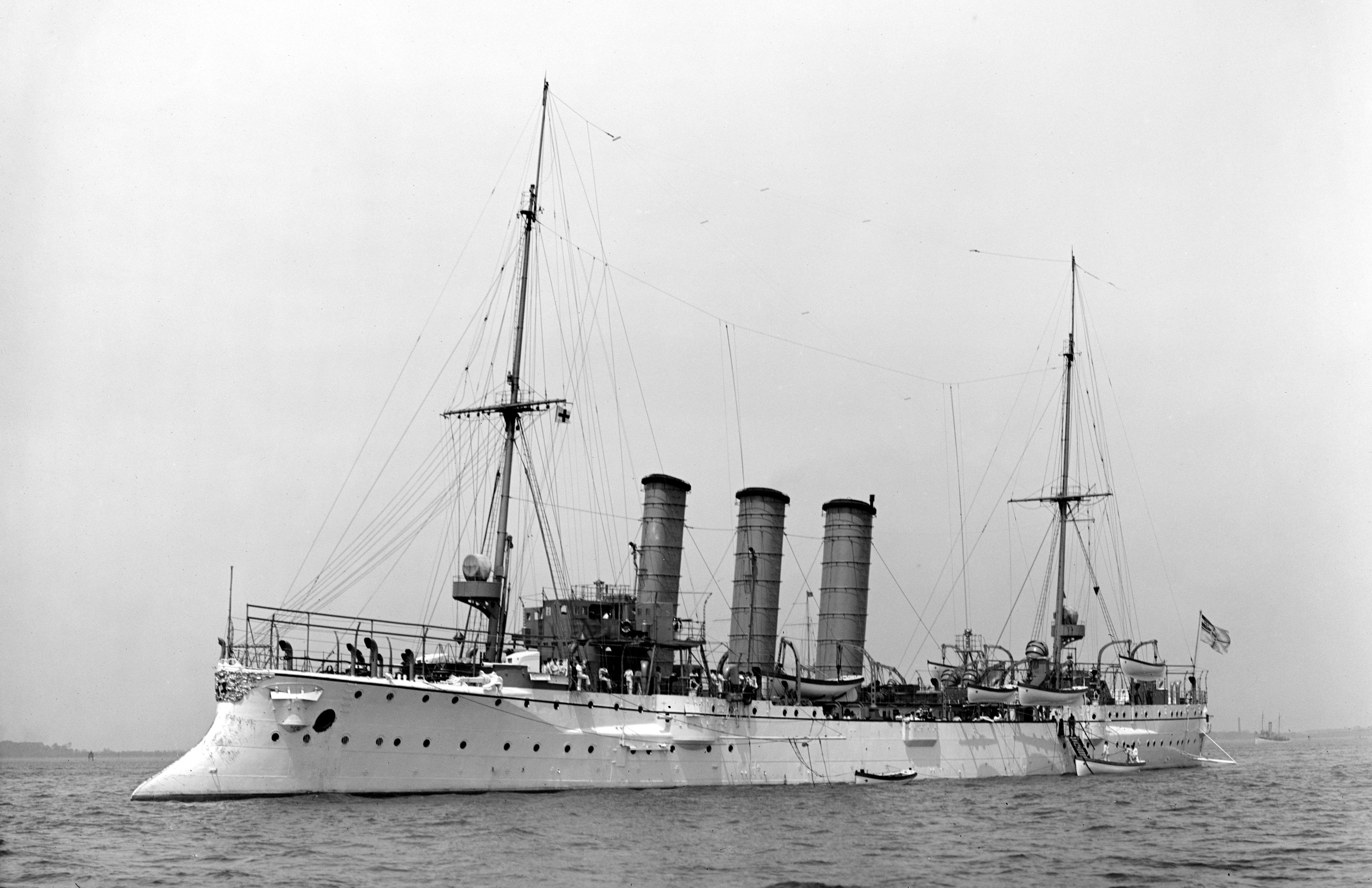
The cruiser SMS Bremen

On 16 December 1911 Augsburg left Hamburg in ballast. Her master was a Captain Wilhelm Winter from Altona, Hamburg. The number of her crew was variously reported as 37 or 39. She reached New York on 5 January 1912, where she spent four weeks in port. She loaded cargo that included cans of kerosene for Batavia. On 2 February she left New York for Batavia via Durban. She was expected in Durban about 5 March, but failed to arrive, and was reported overdue.

The cruiser SMS Bremen searched for her, and on 11 April bunkered at Hamilton, Bermuda to continue her search. On 13 April the Marconi Company wireless station on Cape Race signalled the Hamburg America Line (HAPAG) passenger ship Ypiranga, asking her to change course to search for Augsburg. On 20 April the HAPAG cargo ship Caledonia arrived at Norfolk, Virginia for bunkers. A telegram reached her, ordering her to search for Augsburg when she put to sea two days later.

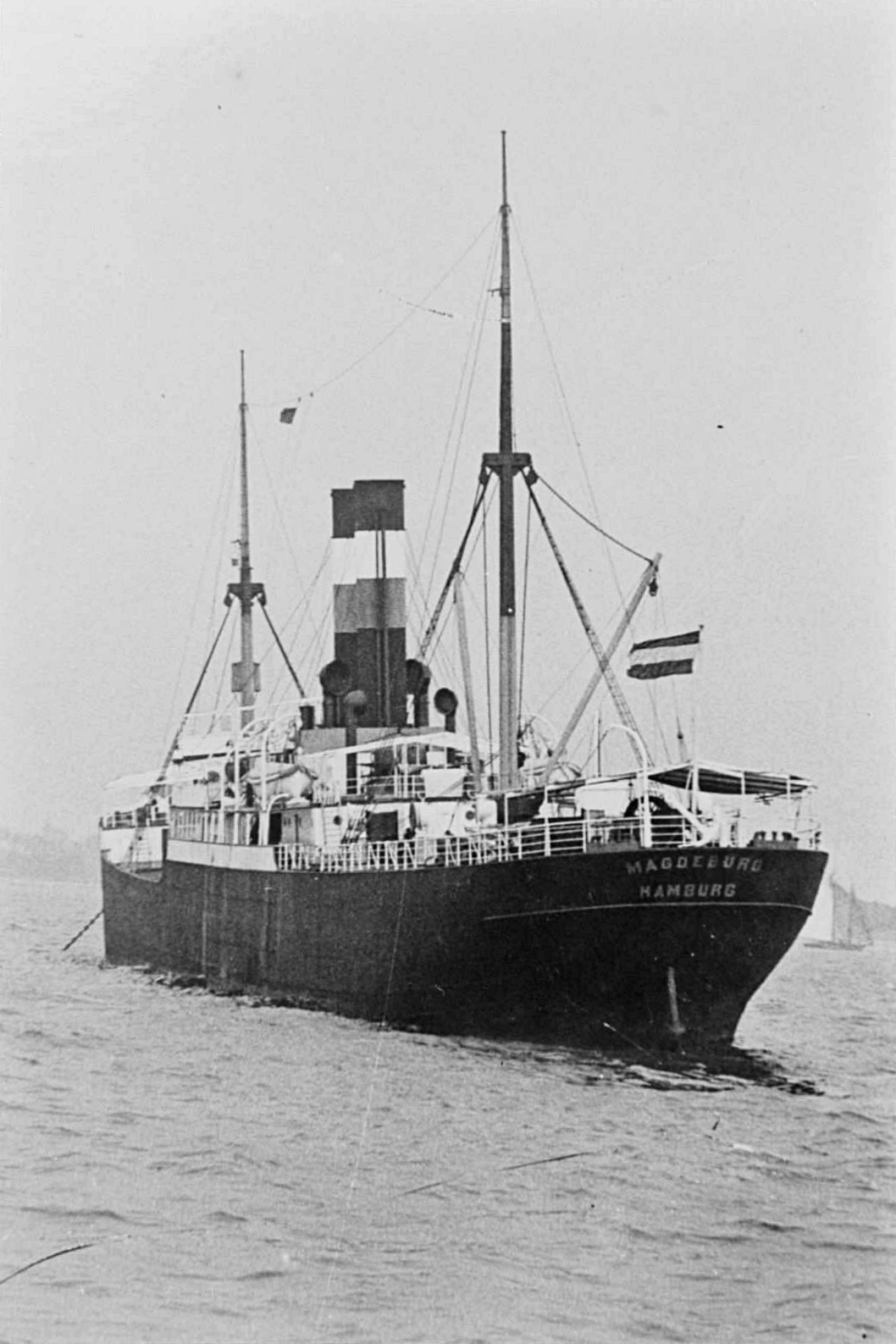
DADG's Magdeburg

On 13 April another DADG ship, Magdeburg, reached Melbourne. She had left New York on the same day as Augsburg, and followed the same route as far as Durban. Two days after leaving New York, Magdeburg encountered a heavy storm. The storm cleared after about 24 hours, and she had good weather for the rest of her voyage. Magdeburg's master, Captain Orgel, feared that Augsburg had foundered in the storm.

A book of the history of DADG, published in 1933, claims that Magdeburg was so delayed by adverse weather that she had to make an unscheduled call for bunkers at São Vicente, Cape Verde. However, this claim is missing from contemporary accounts of Captain Orgel's statement when he reached Melbourne.

There were false reports of Augsburg being sighted adrift. In fact no trace of her was ever found. Captain Orgel's surmise that she foundered in the storm on about 4 February remains a plausible explanation of her loss.

== Bibliography ==
- Harms, Otto (1933). Deutsch-Australische Dampfschiffs-Gesellschaft Hamburg (in German). Hamburg: Schröder & Jeve.
- Lloyd's Register of British and Foreign Shipping. Vol. I.–Steamers. London: Lloyd's Register of Shipping. 1911 – via Internet Archive.
