= SS Ypiranga =

German-built ocean liner

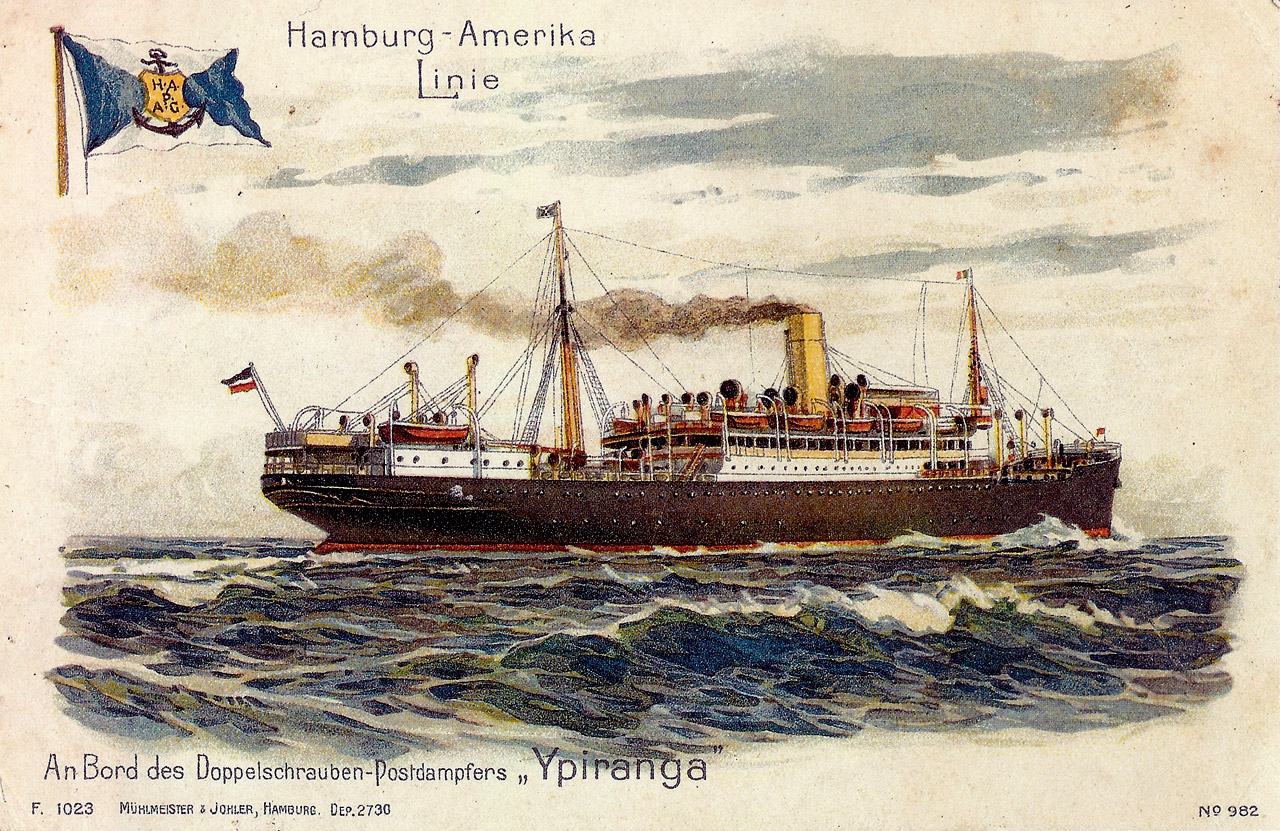
- Official HAPAG postcard for Ypiranga

History
- Name: 1908: Ypiranga; 1921: Assyria; 1929: Colonial; 1950: BISCO 9
- Namesake: 1921: Assyria
- Owner: 1908: Hamburg America Line; 1919: Shipping Controller; 1921: Anchor Line; 1929: Cia Colonial de Nav; 1950: British Iron & Steel Corp
- Operator: 1919: White Star Line; 1921: Henderson Bros
- Port of registry: 1908: (German Empire) Hamburg; 1919: (United Kingdom) London; 1921: (United Kingdom) Glasgow; 1929: (Portugal) Luanda
- Route: 1908: Hamburg – Rio de Janeiro; 1910: Hamburg – Buenos Aires; 1911: Hamburg – Vera Cruz; 1925: Glasgow – Bombay; 1929: Lisbon – Beira
- Builder: F Krupp Germaniawerft, Kiel
- Yard number: 134
- Launched: 13 May 1908
- Refit: 1921, 1929
- Identification: 1908: code letters RPWN; 1913: call sign DYA; 1919: UK official number 143166; 1919: code letters JWKC; 1929: code letters LDBM; 1934: call sign CSCW
- Fate: scrapped 1950

General characteristics
- Type: cargo liner
- Tonnage: 1911: 8,103 GRT, 4,907 NRT; 1921: 8,142 GRT, 4,949 NRT; 1930: 8,308 GRT, 5,218 NRT
- Displacement: 12,600 tons
- Length: 447.0 ft (136.2 m)
- Beam: 55.1 ft (16.8 m)
- Depth: 27.8 ft (8.5 m)
- Decks: 2
- Installed power: 332 NHP, 4,000 ihp
- Propulsion: 2 × quadruple-expansion engines; 2 × screws
- Speed: 13 1/2 knots (25 km/h)
- Capacity: 1908: 136 × 1st class; 126 × 2nd class; 1,050 × steerage; 1921: 241 × cabin class; 140 × 3rd class; 1929: 109 × 1st class; 81 × 2nd class; 239 × 3rd class
- Crew: 154
- Sensors & processing systems: by 1911: submarine signalling
- Notes: sister ship: Corcovado

SS Ypiranga was a cargo liner that was launched in Germany in 1908 for the Hamburg America Line (HAPAG). In 1919 the United Kingdom seized her for World War I reparations. In 1921 Anchor Line acquired her and renamed her Assyria. In 1929 the Companhia Colonial de Navegação (CCN) bought her and renamed her Colonial. In 1950 she was sold for scrap, but she sank off the coast of Scotland while being towed to a scrapyard.

Ypiranga was built for HAPAG's route between Hamburg and Brazil, but in 1911 was transferred to the company's route to Mexico. There she became involved in the politics of the Mexican Revolution, first taking President Porfirio Díaz into exile in 1911, and then gun-running in 1914 in the Ypiranga incident.

== Building ==
In 1908 Friedrich Krupp Germaniawerft in Kiel completed a pair of sister ships for HAPAG. Yard number 133 was launched on 21 December 1907 as Corcovado and completed in April 1908. Yard number 134 was launched on 3 May 1908 as Ypiranga and completed on 8 August. HAPAG gave both ships Brazilian names, as they were built for a service to Brazil.

Ypiranga's registered length was 447.0 ft (136.2 m), her beam was 55.1 ft (16.8 m), and her depth was 27.8 ft (8.5 m). Her tonnages were 8,103 GRT and 4,907 NRT. As built, she had berths for 1,312 passengers: 136 in first class; 126 in second class; and 1,050 in steerage.

Ypiranga had twin screws, each driven by a quadruple-expansion steam engine. The combined power of her twin engines was 332 NHP or 4,000 ihp, and gave her a speed of 13 1/2 knots (25 km/h).

== HAPAG career ==
HAPAG registered Ypiranga in Hamburg. Her code letters were RPWN. On 14 October she left Hamburg on her maiden voyage, which was to Brazil. In 1911 HAPAG extended her route to Río de la Plata.

In September 1910 Germany sold the battleships SMS Kurfürst Friedrich Wilhelm and Weissenburg to the Ottoman Navy. Ypiranga repatriated the German crews that delivered them.

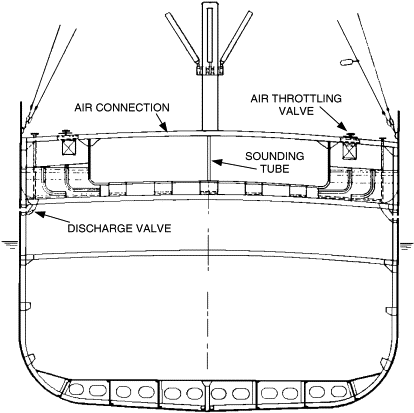
Cross-section of Ypiranga, showing her antiroll tanks

Early in her career, Ypiranga was found to roll badly. By 1911 this had been remedied by installing two antiroll tanks near her foremast and her mainmast, linked by a flying bridge. The flow of water between the tanks, controlled by regulating the movement of the air in the side branches, steadied her in rough seas. After this modification, Ypiranga was reputed to be particularly stable. Her sister ship Corcovado was similarly modified.

By 1911 Ypiranga was equipped with wireless telegraphy. By 1913 her wireless call sign was DYA.

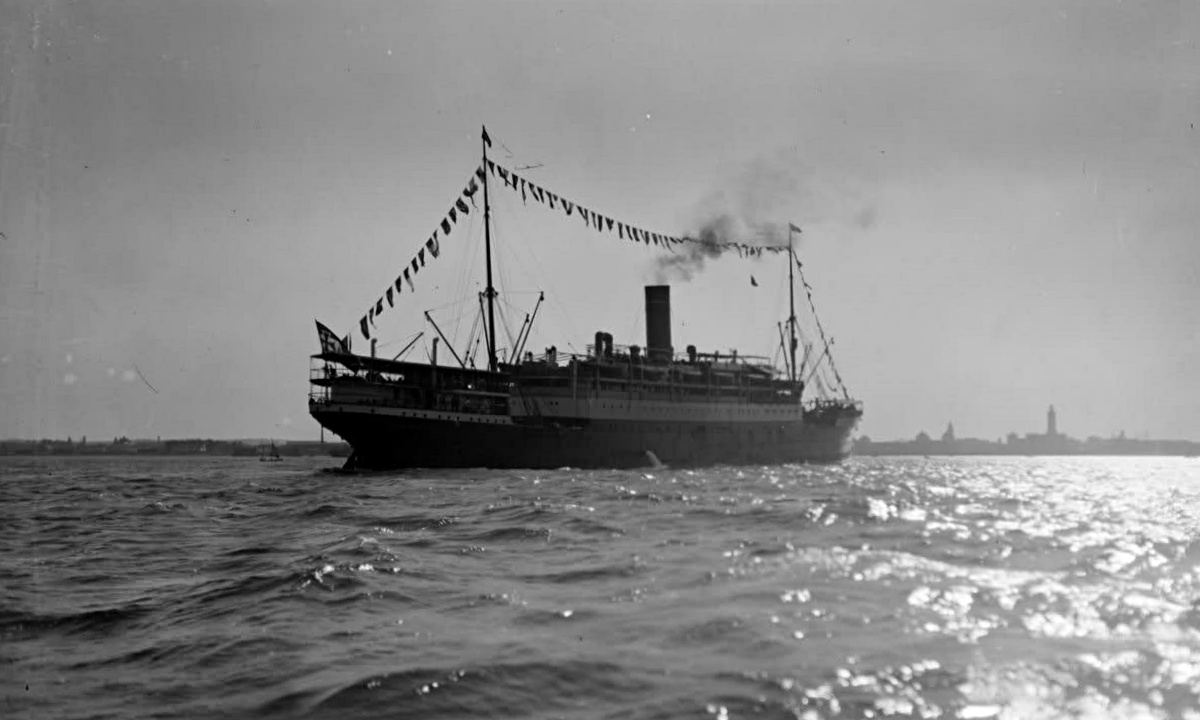
Ypiranga dressed overall and flying a German naval ensign

In 1911 Ypiranga made one round trip between Hamburg and Philadelphia, and then HAPAG transferred her to its route between Hamburg and Mexico via Havana. On 25 May 1911 Porfirio Díaz abdicated as President of Mexico and fled Mexico City. On 31 May he and his family embarked on Ypiranga at Vera Cruz to go into exile. On 4 June the ship called at Havana, where the Mexican ambassador and representatives of the Cuban government came aboard to pay him farewell visits. Diaz remained aboard as far as Le Havre.

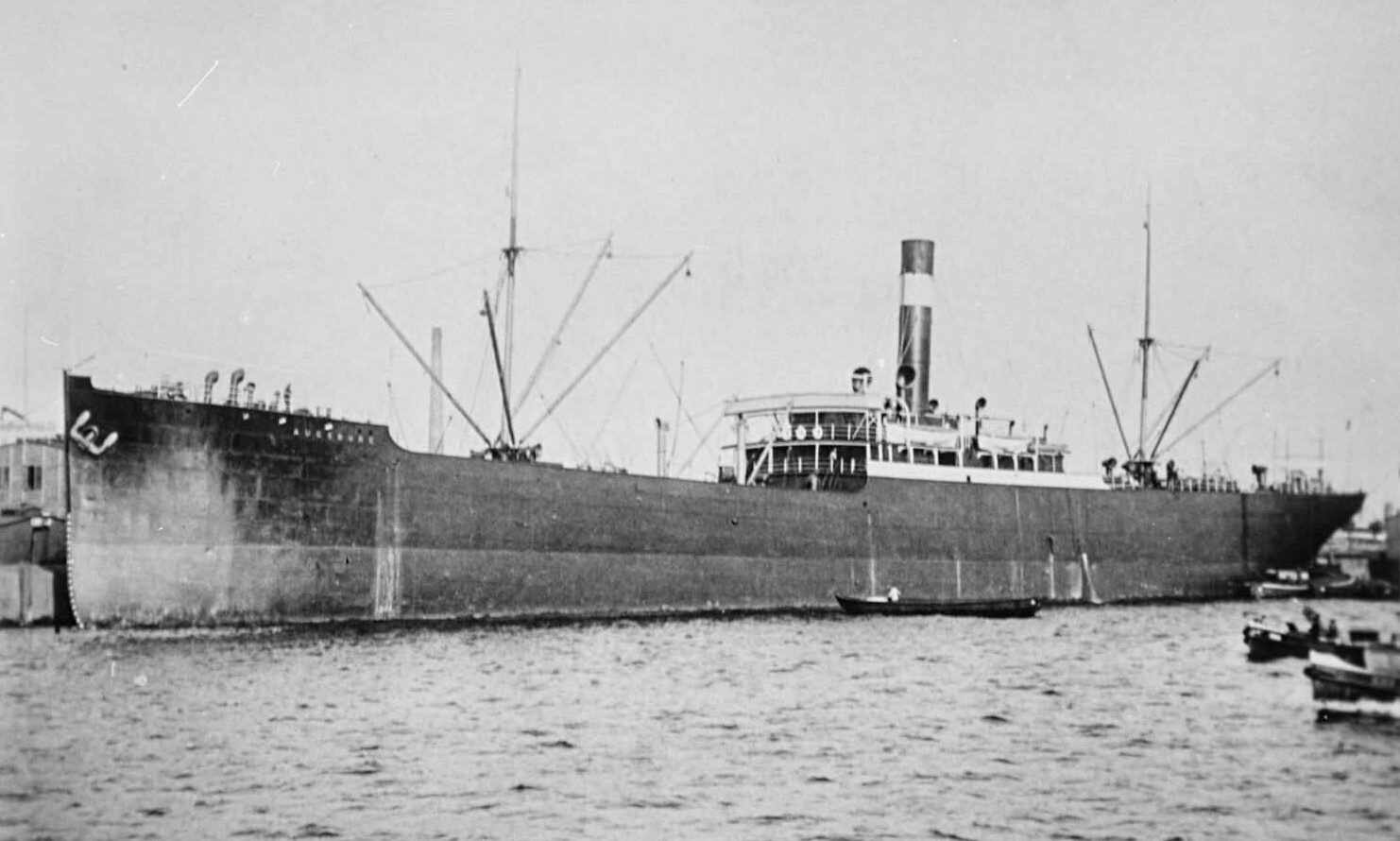
Augsburg

In April 1912 Ypiranga was on an eastbound crossing from Havana to Hamburg via Plymouth and Le Havre. On 13 April the Marconi Company wireless station on Cape Race signalled her, asking her to look for the Deutsch-Australische DG cargo ship Augsburg, which had left New York on 2 February for Durban, and had been reported missing on 22 March. Ypiranga altered course to the south to look for Augsburg. On the night of 15 April Ypiranga's wireless operator received RMS Titanic's first distress signal. However, having diverted to look for Augsburg, she was too far south to go to Titanic's aid. Augsburg was never found.

=== Ypiranga incident ===
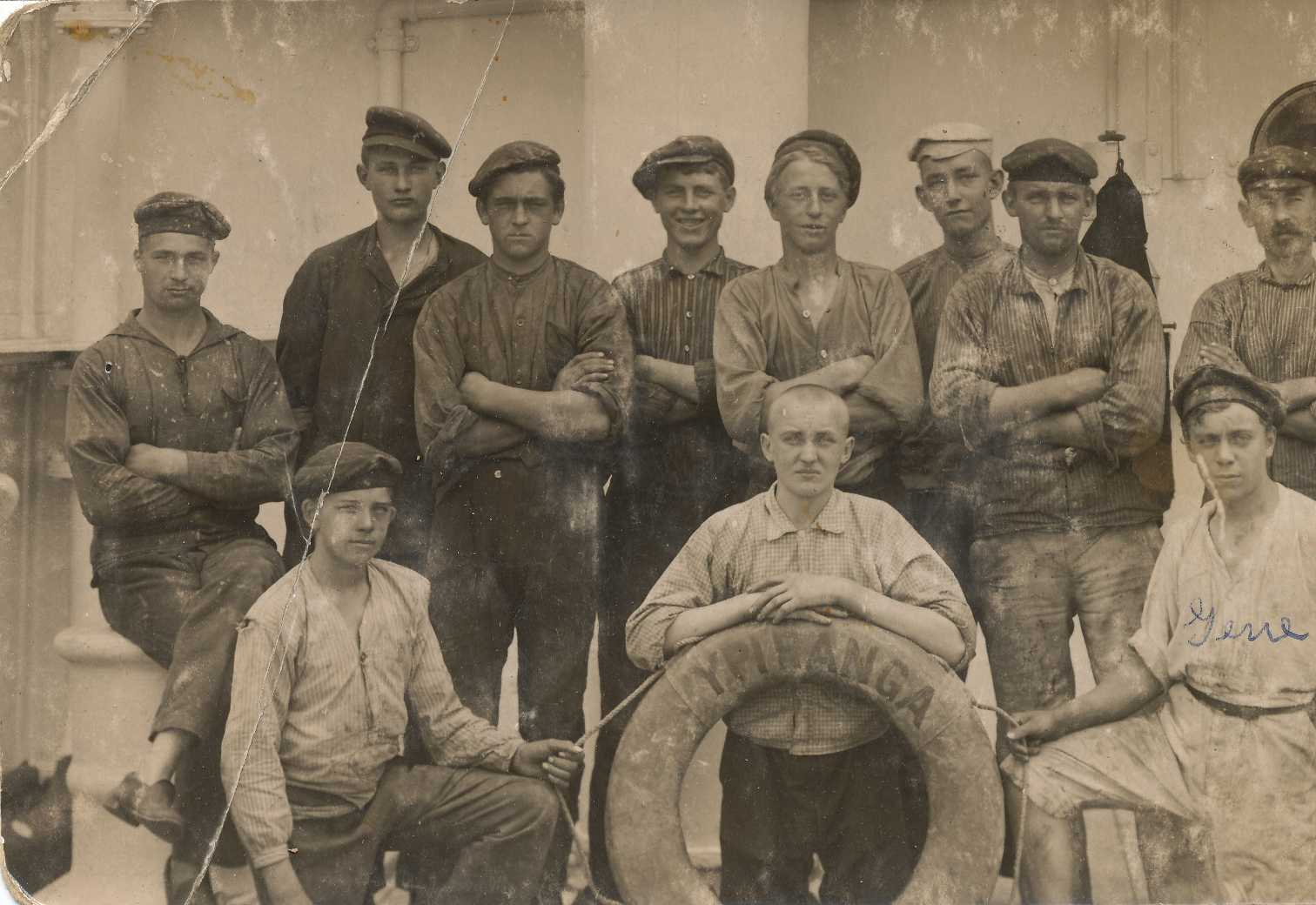
Members of Ypiranga's crew, date unknown

In April and May 1914 Ypiranga delivered a cargo of rifles, machine guns and ammunition to Vera Cruz and Puerto Mexico (now Coatzacoalcos) for President Victoriano Huerta's army. The USA tried to intervene, but was forced to back down. This became known as the Ypiranga incident.

On 7 May Ypiranga reached the quarantine station in Mobile, Alabama. On 9 May she landed 190 refugees who had embarked at Vera Cruz and Tampico. 178 were Germans, and the remainder were from other European countries and the US. The refugees accused all sides in the Mexican Revolution of "barbarity", but especially the Zapatistas. One US refugee alleged that Zapatistas in Tabasco tortured to death a German mining engineer and his wife.

== UK career ==
During the First World War Ypiranga was laid up in Hamburg. On 2 April 1919 the United Kingdom seized her. The Shipping Controller registered her in London. Her official number was 143166 and her code letters were JWKC. The Shipping Controller appointed White Star Line to manage her as a troop ship, repatriating troops to Australia.

In 1920 Ypiranga was laid up in Hull. In 1921 Anchor Line bought her and had her refitted as a two-class ship, with berths for 381 passengers: 241 in cabin class and 140 in third class. Anchor renamed her Assyria and registered her in Glasgow. On 28 May 1921 she left Glasgow on her new route, which was to New York. In August 1925 Anchor transferred her to its route between Glasgow and Bombay. She also made cruises.

== Portuguese career ==
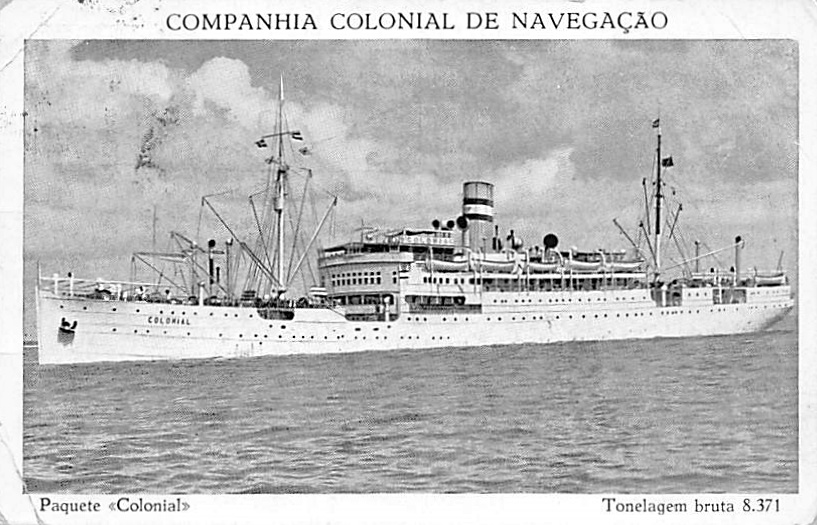
Postcard of the ship as Colonial

In 1929 CCN bought Assyria and had her refitted as a three-class ship, with berths for 429 passengers: 109 in first class, 81 in second class, and 239 in third class. She was renamed Colonial and registered in Luanda in Angola. Her code letters were LDBM. Her route was between Lisbon and Beira in Moçambique. Ports of call en route were Funchal, São Tomé, Sazaire, Luanda, Porto Amboim, Lobito, Moçâmedes, Lourenço Marques (now Maputo), and the Island of Mozambique.

In 1931 CCN also bought her sister ship, the former Corcovado, which by then had been renamed Maria Cristina. She was renamed Mouzinho. By 1934 Colonial's wireless call sign was CSCW, and this had superseded her code letters.

On 31 May 1941 a German U-boat sank the Clan Line motor ship Clan MacDougall north of Cape Verde. On 1 June the Portuguese ship Tarrafal found 85 survivors in four lifeboats 10 nautical miles (19 km) off Santo Antão, Cape Verde. Tarrafal rescued them and landed them on São Vicente. On 4 July 1941 a U-boat sank the T & J Harrison steamship Auditor northwest of Cape Verde. 75 survivors in lifeboats reached the Azores on 15, 16 and 17 July.

On 25 July Mouzinho called at São Vicente, where she embarked some of Clan MacDougall's survivors to take them to Bathurst (now Banjul) in Gambia. On 21 August Colonial called at São Vicente, where she embarked some of Auditor's survivors and the remainder of Clan MacDougall's survivors to take them to Cape Town in South Africa. On 10 September another CCN ship, Guiné, embarked the remainder of Auditor's survivors to take them to Bathurst.

In September 1950 CCN sold Colonial for scrap to the British Iron & Steel Corporation (BISCO), who renamed her BISCO 9. On 17 September she was being towed to a scrapyard in Scotland when she grounded at position 55°25′32″N 5°36′09″W near Campbeltown in the Firth of Clyde. In 1951 she was scrapped in situ.

== Sister Ship ==
Sister ship Corcovado (1907) later: Sueh, Guglielmo Pierce, Corcovado, Maria Christina, Mauzinho

The Corcovado (8,099 GRT) [ See picture ] was also built at the Germaniawerft, Kiel, for the South America/Brazil service. She was launched on 21 December 1907 and made her maiden voyage from Hamburg to South America. Website about it in German ]From 1911, she, like her sister ship, was deployed to Central America. On 19 October 1912, she sailed from Hamburg to New York for the first time, and on 15 March 1914, she sailed from Hamburg to Philadelphia for the first time.

On 15 April 1914 she opened a new HAPAG line from New York to the Mediterranean and the Black Sea, on which she was deployed with the two older steamers Barcelona ex Arabia (5,446 GRT) and Pisa (4,967 GRT) from 1896. When the Corcovado arrived in Constantinople there was a large banquet on board with the US ambassador Morgenthau . On 20 May she began her first return voyage from Odessa via Batumi to Constantinople, Smyrna, Piraeus and New York. On 26 July 1914 the Corcovado reached Odessa again and was able to reach Constantinople before the outbreak of the First World War . For the duration of the war she served as an accommodation ship and headquarters of the German Mediterranean Division .

In 1915 she was sold to Turkey and renamed Sueh .

On 6 December 1918, the Allied occupying forces interned German and Austrian citizens living in Istanbul on the Sueh before expelling them. [ 9 ]

In 1919 the ship came to France as war booty and was given back its old name.

In 1920, she was sold to the Italian shipping company Sicula Americana in Naples and renamed Gugliemo Pierce . The ship was initially used on the Naples-South America route, sailing from Naples to New York for the first time on December 9, 1920. On November 5, 1923, she embarked on her 14th and final voyage to New York. In 1926, she was chartered to the Cosulich Line, Trieste. In 1927, Sicula sold her to Lloyd Sabaudo in Genoa, who renamed her Maria Christina .

In 1930, the Portuguese Cia Colonial purchased the ship and renamed it Mouzinho . The ship was then again deployed on the Lisbon-Angola-Mozambique route with her sister ship Colonial, formerly the Ypiranga . In June and August 1941, she made two voyages between Lisbon and New York. In 1954, the former Corcovado was scrapped in Savona .

== Bibliography ==
- Haws, Duncan (1980). The Ships of the Hamburg America, Adler and Carr Lines. Merchant Fleets in Profile. Vol. 4. Cambridge: Patrick Stephens Ltd. ISBN 0-85059-397-2.
- Hildebrand, Hans H; Röhr, Albert; Steinmetz, Hans-Otto (1982). Die Deutschen Kriegsschiffe (in German). Vol. 5. Herford: Koehler Verlag. ISBN 978-3782202367.
- Lloyd's Register of British and Foreign Shipping. Vol. I.–Steamers. London: Lloyd's Register of Shipping. 1911 – via Internet Archive.
- Lloyd's Register of Shipping. Vol. II.–Steamers. London: Lloyd's Register of Shipping. 1921 – via Internet Archive.
- Lloyd's Register of Shipping (PDF). Vol. II.–Steamers and Motorships of 300 tons gross and over. London: Lloyd's Register of Shipping. 1930 – via Southampton City Council.
- Lloyd's Register of Shipping (PDF). Vol. II.–Steamers and Motorships of 300 tons gross and over. London: Lloyd's Register of Shipping. 1934 – via Southampton City Council.
- The Marconi Press Agency Ltd (1913). The Year Book of Wireless Telegraphy and Telephony. London: The St Katherine Press.
- Mercantile Navy List. London. 1920 – via Crew List Index Project.
- Mercantile Navy List. London. 1923 – via Crew List Index Project.
- Rothe, Klaus (1986). Deutsche Ozean-Passagierschiffe 1896 bis 1918. Bibliothek der Schiffstypen (in German). Berlin: VEB Verlag für Verkehrswesen. ISBN 3-344-00059-4.
