= Martin Aufhäuser =

Jewish-German banker forced to flee due to Nazi persecution and seizure of bank

- Born: May 26, 1875; Munich, Germany
- Died: 1944 (aged 68–69); California, United States
- Occupation: Banker

Martin Aufhäuser (born May 26, 1875 in Munich; died 1944 in Los Angeles, California) was a German banker who ran and grew private bank Bankhaus H. Aufhäuse. During the Nazi era the bank was Aryanized and Aufhäuser escaped to the United States.

== Life ==
Martin Aufhäuser was the son of the banker Heinrich Aufhäuser (1842–1917). The elder Aufhäuser founded with Samuel Scharlach Bankhaus Aufhäuser & Scharlach in Munich on May 14, 1870. By 1892 Heinrich Aufhäuser paid off his former partner Scharlach and changed the name to Bankhaus H. Aufhäuser from 1894. The bank rose quickly, and gained customers such as Duke Luitpold in Bavaria, the families of Thomas Mann as well as Neuberger and Einstein (Alfred Einstein). By 1913, H. Aufhäuser's balance sheet total exceeded 10 million gold marks.

After high school in Munich, Martin Aufhäuser completed a banking apprenticeship in Frankfurt am Main. From 1891 he worked at Bankhaus H. Aufhäuser. After his father's death, Martin took over the bank together with his younger brother Siegfried Aufhäuser. In 1918 he became a senior partner there.

In 1918 the Berlin banking house S. Bleichröder became a limited partner of the banking house H. Aufhäuser - another sign of the concentration process among banks since the turn of the century. The official name was now: H. Aufhäuser Kommandite von S. Bleichröder in Berlin.

From 1921 Martin Aufhäusers took a stake in Bankhaus S. Bleichröder, which resulted in a cross-shareholding between the two Jewish banking houses, as Ernst Kritzler, a partner in S. Bleichröder since 1917, joined Bankhaus H. Aufhäuser at the same time. Martin Aufhäuser also sat on the supervisory board of the Golddiskontbank, a new bank founded in 1924 as a subsidiary of the Reichsbank after the hyperinflation to provide German foreign trade with a convertible means of payment again.

Martin Aufhäuser was also a member of the board of the Munich Stock Exchange and the Munich Chamber of Commerce. In 1926 he was appointed a Privy Councillor of Commerce.

== Nazi era persecution ==
When Hitler came to power in 1933 the Aufhäusers were persecuted for being Jewish. The bank was subjected to massive repressive measures and lost customers due to anti-Jewish boycotts and other racial persecution. Jewish customers emigrated or were deported. After the violent anti-Jewish Nazi pogrom known as Kristallnacht, Bankhaus H. Aufhäuser was "forcibly Aryanized" at the beginning of November, and in December 1938 Friedrich Wilhelm Seiler took over the bank; H. Aufhäuser was thus one of the last private banks and one of the most important to be "Aryanized" in this way.

In June 1941 Aufhäuser fled Europe aboard the Portuguese ship Mouzinho, which took him from Lisbon to New York. He died in Los Angeles in 1944.

== Literature ==
- Herrmann A. L. Degener: Degeners Wer ist’s? Berlin 1935, S. 42.
- Aufhäuser, Martin. In: Werner Röder, Herbert A. Strauss: Biographisches Handbuch der deutschsprachigen Emigration nach 1933. Band 1. K. G. Saur, München 1980, S. ?.
- Felix Höpfner u. a.: Unabhängig – Persönlich – Unternehmerisch. Eine Chronik von Hauck & Aufhäuser Privatbankiers. München 2012, ISBN 978-3-937996-31-8 (Digitalisat).
