= David Aufhauser =

American lawyer

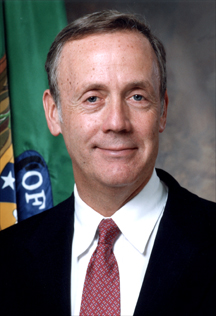

General Counsel of the United States Department of the Treasury
- In office 2001–2004
- President: George W. Bush
- Preceded by: Neal S. Wolin
- Succeeded by: Arnold I. Havens

Personal details
- Education: Wesleyan University (AB); Harvard University (MBA); University of Pennsylvania (JD)

David Aufhauser is an American lawyer. He served as general counsel of the United States Treasury Department from 2001 to 2004 during the George W. Bush administration. After 9/11, Aufhauser was a key player in disrupting and freezing further terrorist activity against the U.S. He is best known for running the federal government's programs to go after terrorist financing, a major strategy in the war on terror. He ran the National Security Council Committee on Terrorist Financing; oversaw the legal departments of important agencies and divisions within the U.S. Treasury Department including International Banking, Domestic Banking, the U.S. Customs Service, IRS criminal and civil divisions, ATF, Financial Crimes and Money Laundering, and United States Secret Service; and supervised the federal government's multi-agency antiterrorism task force. In his numerous briefings before the House and Senate, he emphasized the importance of teaching tolerance and respect, often making clear distinctions between the vast majority of peaceful people in the Middle East and the practitioners of “counterfeit religion” who preyed on hopelessness to recruit terrorists.

He began his legal career in 1977 at Williams & Connolly. After completing his government service, he worked in investment banking and returned to Williams & Connolly in 2008.

In 2010 and 2011, he was named one of Washington's best attorneys.

== Education and early career ==
Aufhauser earned his AB from Wesleyan University, MBA from Harvard University, and JD from the University of Pennsylvania Law School.

He was a guest lecturer at Harvard Law School, the University of Chicago, University of Pennsylvania, Georgetown University, MIT, and Johns Hopkins University.

Aufhauser practiced law at Williams & Connolly from 1977 to 2001. In 2001, he was appointed by President George W. Bush and confirmed by the U.S. Senate to serve as general counsel in the United States Department of the Treasury.

After September 11, 2001, Aufhauser ran the National Security Council Committee on Terrorist Financing. He supervised the federal government's multi-agency antiterrorism task force.

Between 2004 and 2008, he worked at UBS investment bank. Currently, Aufhauser is a partner at William & Connolly LLP, a Washington, D.C. law firm. He specializes in litigation, arbitration, and government investigations.

== U.S. Treasury Department service ==
During his tenure as the Treasury Department's general counsel, Aufhauser oversaw the legal departments of the IRS, U.S. Bureau of Customs, Secret Service, ATF, U.S. Mint, Financial Crimes Enforcement Network, the Office of Foreign Asset Controls, and several of the department's divisions including International Affairs, Domestic Banking and Finance, and Enforcement.

He led the team that implemented the sections of the Patriot Act run by the Treasury Department. He also led the team that implemented economic sanctions.

Additionally, he ran other programs related to the reconstruction of Afghanistan and Iraq, money laundering, China currency issues, tax reform, and sovereign debt restructuring.

Following the Enron crisis, President Bush appointed a Department of Justice task force on corporate fraud and abuse. Aufhauser served on the panel as Treasury's representative.

== Work against terrorist financing ==
In Ron Suskind's book, The One Percent Doctrine, Suskind describes the acute difference between the public perception and the reality behind the use of the White House Situation Room:

“The Situation Room – that rectangle of wood paneling and dropdown screens in the White House basement – has recently matched the Oval Office as most storied chamber of the US government. In an odd turn of the media age, this tiny square of carpeted real estate has seized the public’s imagination. … On balance though, little actually get done there….For problem solving and action plans, anxious public servants will, time and again, by pass the Situation Room for its small adjacent conference room – a place where real work gets done."

Beginning in October 2001, a half dozen or so key officials met each Wednesday morning in the Situation Room's conference room. Aufhauser managed the group. Suskind writes, “David Aufhauser, an elegant Washington lawyer . . . coordinated the government’s overall ‘financial war.’” Officials from the National Security Council, Central Intelligence Agency, and National Security Agency (NSA) met under Aufhauser’s command. The group’s mission was to figure out how money flowed around the globe to Al-Qaeda, and how to stop that flow.

The man who straps a bomb to his chest as he enters a marketplace is implacable. He is beyond redemption and cannot be deterred. It would be the height of irony and a promise of future tragedy if we permit the orthodoxy of how we have organized ourselves in the past and how we have collected and acted upon intelligence in the past to deter us from responding in the future.

— David Aufhauser (2004)
Testimony before the United States Senate

On June 15, 2004, Aufhauser testified before a hearing of the U.S. Senate Committee on Governmental Affairs, “An Assessment of Current Efforts to Combat Terrorism Financing.” In his testimony, he didn't mince words when describing Osama bin Laden, who he called a “hapless businessman” whose “ventures failed and were not the principal source of al Qaeda’s wealth.” In explaining bin Laden's rise to leadership, Aufhauser testified, “In doing so, bin Laden managed to leverage the tactic of terror into a malevolent dogma embraced by an army of madmen.”

In his testimony, Aufhauser pushed hard for what he believed was the best strategy to fight terrorism: stop the funding of terrorism in order to “scale back the violence [and] to deplete the resources made available to kill innocent people.” During the hearing (which was held in 2004), he declared that Al Qaeda was more lethal than it was on 9/11.

Shortly after U.S. military forces removed Saddam Hussein from power at the start of the Iraq War, Aufhauser testified before the U.S. House Financial Services Subcommittee on Oversight and Investigations. In his testimony, Aufhauser advocated a policy to give back Iraq's wealth to the Iraqi people: Iraqi oil, $1.7 billion in Iraqi assets invested in the U.S., $2.3 billion in frozen assets held in other foreign countries, assets that had been stolen from the Iraq Central Bank, and a donor fund from the international community. He told the committee, “Whatever unfound money there is, ought to be returned to feed people.”

=== Terrorism’s three currencies ===
As an official at the Treasury Department, Aufhauser coined a phrase that represented the root causes of terrorism – terrorism's “three currencies.” The three currencies are hate, counterfeit religion, and money. He believed that a hopeless environment in many areas within the Middle East created hate and counterfeit religion that fueled terrorist zealousness. However, one of the primary purposes of his role in the war on terrorism was to go after terror financing.

Aufhauser believed that a cash-rich terrorist cell would be difficult to stop. However, if forces could prevent the cell from obtaining finances in the first place, it would greatly diminish the threat.

=== Reverse money laundering ===
As I told you, I did not know then whether my words or advocacy could change people's minds. I did, as I told you, believe that a dollar well deployed could enhance opportunity and thereby diminish antipathy to our values. But I now know that preventing a dollar from being misapplied can be of equal service and is, perhaps, the surest weapon we have to make the homeland secure and to let our kids go to schools that teach tolerance and respect for people of all faiths.

— David Aufhauser (2003)
"The Threat of Terrorist Financing"
Hearing before the Senate Judiciary Committee, Subcommittee on Terrorism, Technology and Homeland Security

In the book Targeting Terrorist Financing: International Cooperation and New Regimes, author Arabinda Acharya offers a contrast between terrorist financing and traditional money laundering. While traditional money laundering is the act of turning criminally obtained currency into clean-looking money, the reverse is true in terrorist financing; terrorists obtain legitimate-looking funding and then use it to conduct criminal acts. Acharya referred to this as “reverse money laundering.” Aufhauser agreed; using traditional money laundering law enforcement tools to go after terrorist financing was a losing battle. Acharya writes, “Thus as David Aufhauser, former General Counsel of the US Treasury puts it, using anti-money laundering tools to target terrorist financing is like “looking at the world of [terrorist financing] from the wrong end of the telescope.’”

=== Office of Foreign Assets Control (OFAC) ===
The Office of Foreign Assets Control (OFAC) had a little more than one hundred employees after 9/11. The office was not well understood by the public, but was powerful. One of OFAC's responsibilities was to administer the United States' economic sanctions programs. In 1986, OFAC issued its first list of "Specially Designated Nationals." People on the list were generally barred from participating in America's banking system. After 9/11, OFAC used its legal sanctions powers to freeze and seize Al Qaeda's finances. However, before OFAC could do so, it needed authority from the President of the United States.

Aufhauser and a small group of attorneys from Treasury and OFAC drafted the executive order they needed to go after Al Qaeda. Prior to 9/11, OFAC was legally restricted to pursue terrorist financing; it had to go after very specifically designated terrorist organizations. Aufhauser and his colleagues drafted the executive order to give OFAC broad authority to go after terrorism at large. People and organizations subject to the new authority included financial supporters of terrorist organizations, the businesses owned by them, and anyone associated with them.

== Elections law ==
In the November 2000 Florida presidential election legal battles, Aufhauser supervised the Republican Party's effort to have overseas military ballots counted. The ballots were cast on time, but received from theaters of conflict, such as Bosnia, too late for the November 4 count. Aufhauser prevailed on the legal arguments, the votes were opened, and the overwhelming majority elected Bush as president.

== Awards ==
The Treasury Department awarded Aufhauser the Alexander Hamilton Award. The award is the highest award that the Treasury Department gives. The FBI, CIA, Secret Service, and State Department also gave awards to Aufhauser for his service.

== Boards ==
Aufhauser was a senior adviser to the Center for Strategic and International Studies (CSIS). In his role, he helped CSIS develop policy plans to curb terrorist financing.

He is a trustee, advisor and board member to a number of organizations including the Atlantic Council, the Council on Foreign Relations, St. Albans School of Public Service, and the National Intelligence Council’s Global Markets Advisory Board.

== Personal life ==
Aufhauser was raised in Stony Brook, New York. He was born in New York City, and currently resides in Washington, D.C.

Aufhauser has three children. During his confirmation hearing before the Senate Committee on Finance, Aufhauser made the room laugh when he joked that his daughter had recently been elected president of her seventh grade class, only to learn that they have term limits.
