= North Bronx =

Region in the New York City borough of The Bronx

Coordinates: 40.856°N 73.865°W

The North Bronx is the northern section of the Bronx, one of the five boroughs of New York City. It is bordered by Westchester County to the north, the South Bronx to the south, the Hudson River to the west and the Long Island Sound to the east. The western part is more urbanized and hilly than its eastern counterpart, just like the rest of the borough. Despite being recognized as different from the South Bronx, the actual borders of the North Bronx is undefined. One commonly set border is Fordham Road/Pelham Parkway, the upper limit for widespread poverty and arson during the 1970s and 1980s.

Overall, the North Bronx is better off than the South Bronx despite gentrification occurring in both. The North Bronx has the affluent cluster of neighborhoods centered around Riverdale, including the former, Fieldston, Spuyten Duyvil, Hudson Hills, and to a lesser extent, Kingsbridge. The North Bronx is home to the largest shopping district along Fordham Road, with shops as far west as University Avenue and as east as Third Avenue. Tracey Towers, the second tallest buildings in the Bronx are located here. Only the Harlem River Park Towers are taller, at 404 feet compared to 400 feet for Tracey Towers. However, the North Bronx is home to the largest housing development in Co-op City.

Neighborhoods include Riverdale, Bedford Park, Fordham, Norwood, Woodlawn Heights, Wakefield, Baychester, and Co-op City.

== History ==
European contact with the Bronx first occurred almost 400 years ago. In 1609, Henry Hudson, probably the first European to see the shoreline, sought cover from a storm for his vessel the Halve Maen in Spuyten Duyvil Creek. Thirty years later in 1639, the mainland was settled by Jonas Bronck, a Swedish sea captain from the Netherlands who eventually built a farmstead at what became 132nd Street and Lincoln Avenue; a small group of Dutch, German, and Danish servants settled with him.

Most of the eastern half of the area now known as the Bronx was bought in 1654 by Thomas Pell (Pelham Bay is named after him) of Connecticut, who invited sixteen families to form the village of Westchester near what is now Westchester Square. Westchester was between 1683 and 1714 the seat of Westchester County (which included the Bronx until the second half of the nineteenth century) and as a chartered borough was the only town in the colony with an elected mayor. In addition, it was the first town without a property qualification for suffrage: settlers chose a representative to the provincial assembly and had their own municipal court. Horses, cattle, sheep and wheat were the main agricultural products and a cottage industry in cloth making thrived.

During English rule most inhabitants were English, of English descent, or Dutch. Anglicanism was the religion sanctioned by colonial law, but Presbyterians, Quakers, and members of the Dutch Reformed Church were in the majority. The first blacks, slaves from the West Indies, soon made up 10 to 15 percent of the population. Native Americans left the area soon after 1700.

The North Bronx saw constant conflict during the American Revolution. The North Bronx was a critical, contested front, serving as a battleground for British attempts to cut off Washington’s escape from Manhattan in 1776. Key events included the 1776 Battle of Pell's Point, the 1778 Stockbridge Massacre, and the transformation of the region north of Manhattan into the infamous Neutral Ground of Westchester County.

During the early nineteenth century the chief occupations of lower Westchester County were growing wheat and raising livestock; between 1800 and 1830 the population rose from 1755 to 3023. Severe famine in Ireland and the growth of industry and commerce in the city drew thousands of Irish to the Bronx as laborers.

Many Irish immigrants were employed in the construction of the High Bridge over the Harlem River, the New York and Harlem Railroad, and the Croton Aqueduct. Much of the area consisted of fertile lands that yielded fruits, vegetables, and dairy products for sale in the city. The first railroad tracks were laid over these lands, and rural stations eventually became the centers of new villages such as Melrose, Tremont, and Riverdale, Bronx.

After the Second World War, new housing was built and the makeup of the population changed. Construction ranged from luxury apartment buildings in Riverdale to public housing in the southern Bronx. Longtime residents and former servicemen moved from older housing into privately built housing in the North Bronx. As commuting by automobile became more convenient, high-rise apartment building were erected in neighborhoods along the new roads, including Spuyten Duyvil and Riverdale. Co-op City, a complex of 15,372 units built in the North Bronx between 1968 and 1970, housed sixty thousand people and was among the largest housing developments in the world.
