= Davis Brody Bond =

American architectural firm

Davis Brody Bond, LLP
- Type: Limited Liability Partnership
- Industry: Architecture and Planning
- Predecessor: Davis, Brody & Associates; Bond Ryder & Associates
- Founded: New York City, New York, United States (1952)
- Founders: Lewis Davis; Samuel Brody; Chester Wisniewski; J. Max Bond Jr.
- Area served: International
- Services: Architecture; Urban Design; Master Planning; Interior Design; Programming; Historic Preservation; Sustainable Design
- Number of employees: >100
- Website: davisbrodybond.com

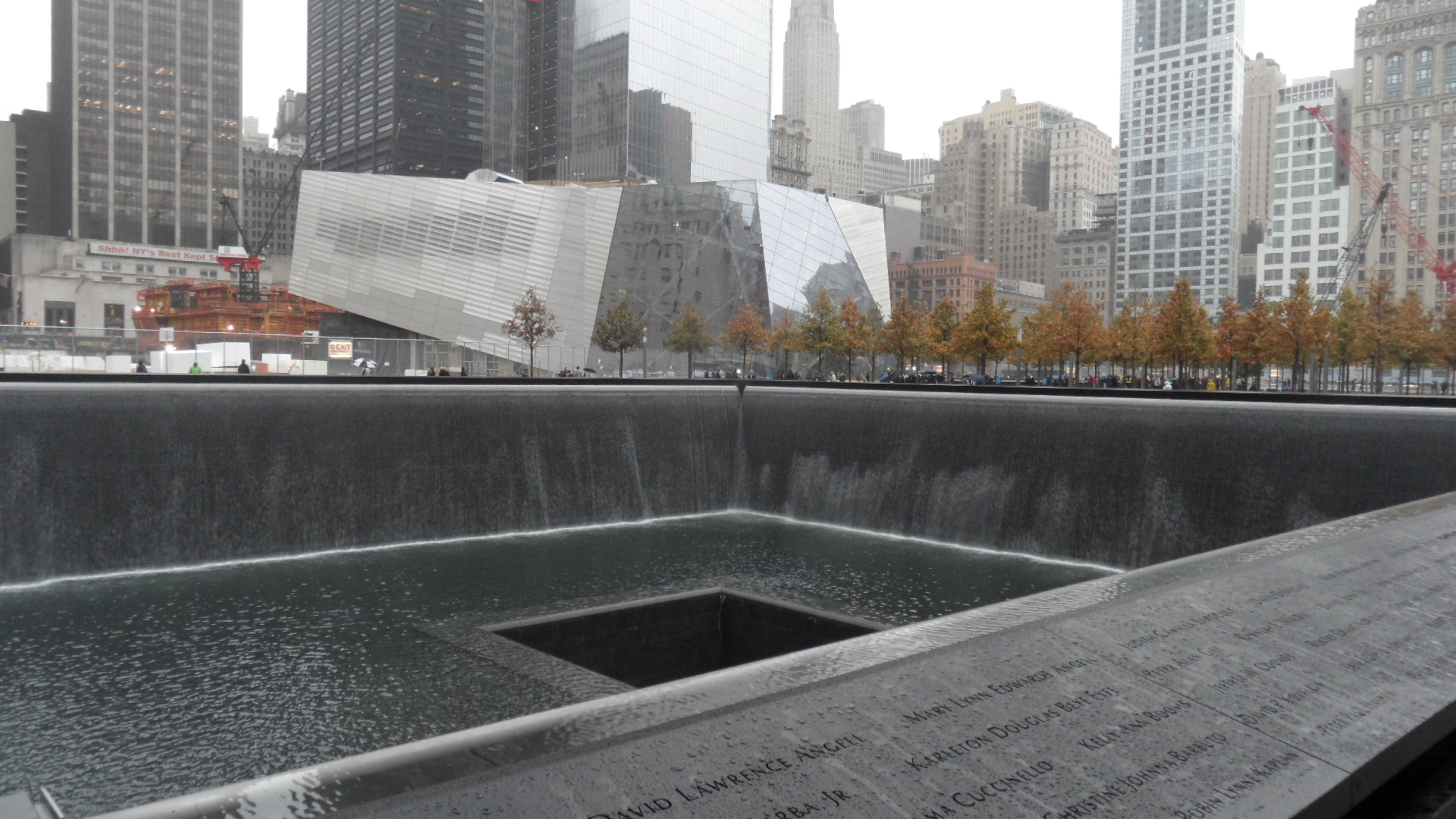
National September 11 Memorial & Museum

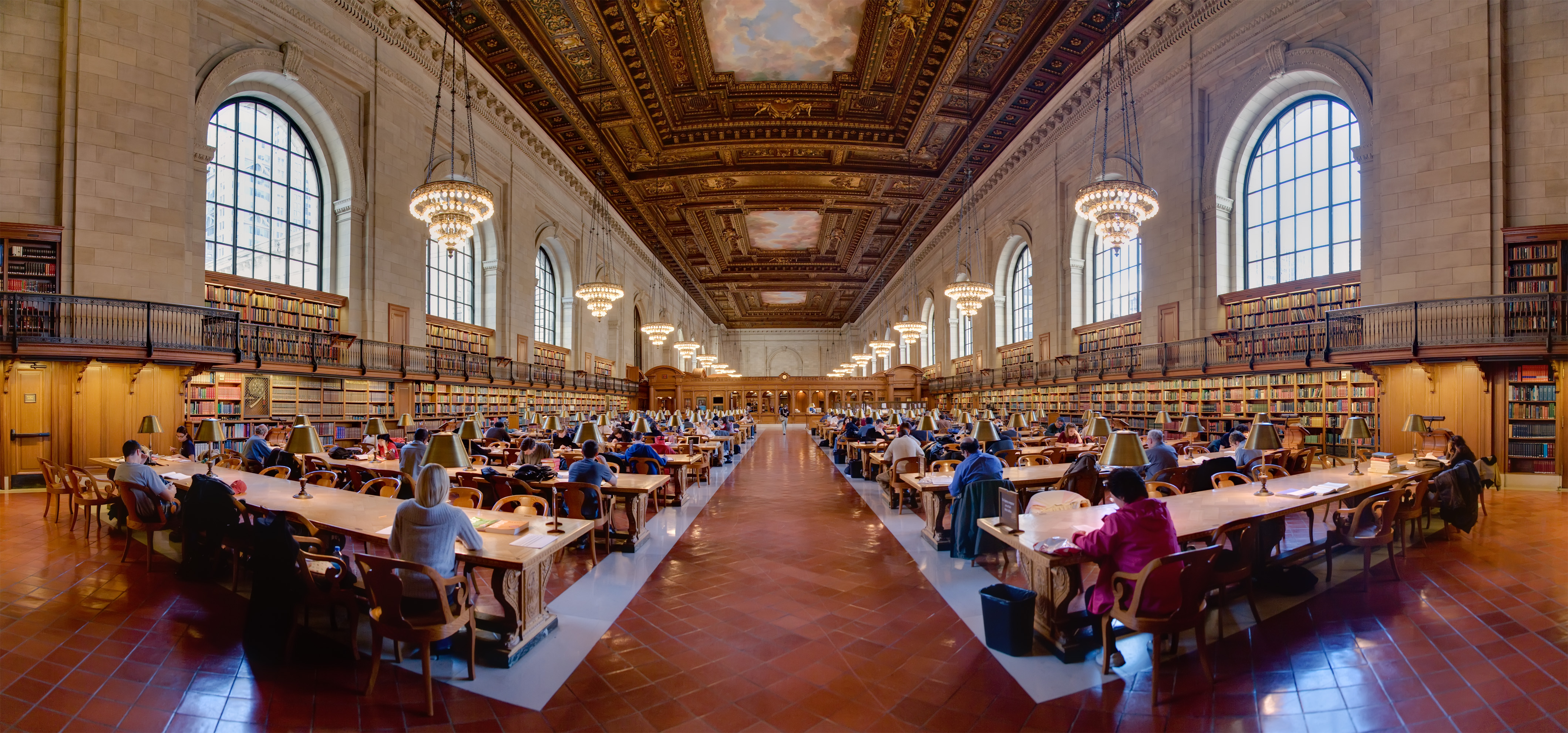
A panoramic view of the New York Public Library Rose Main Reading Room, facing south

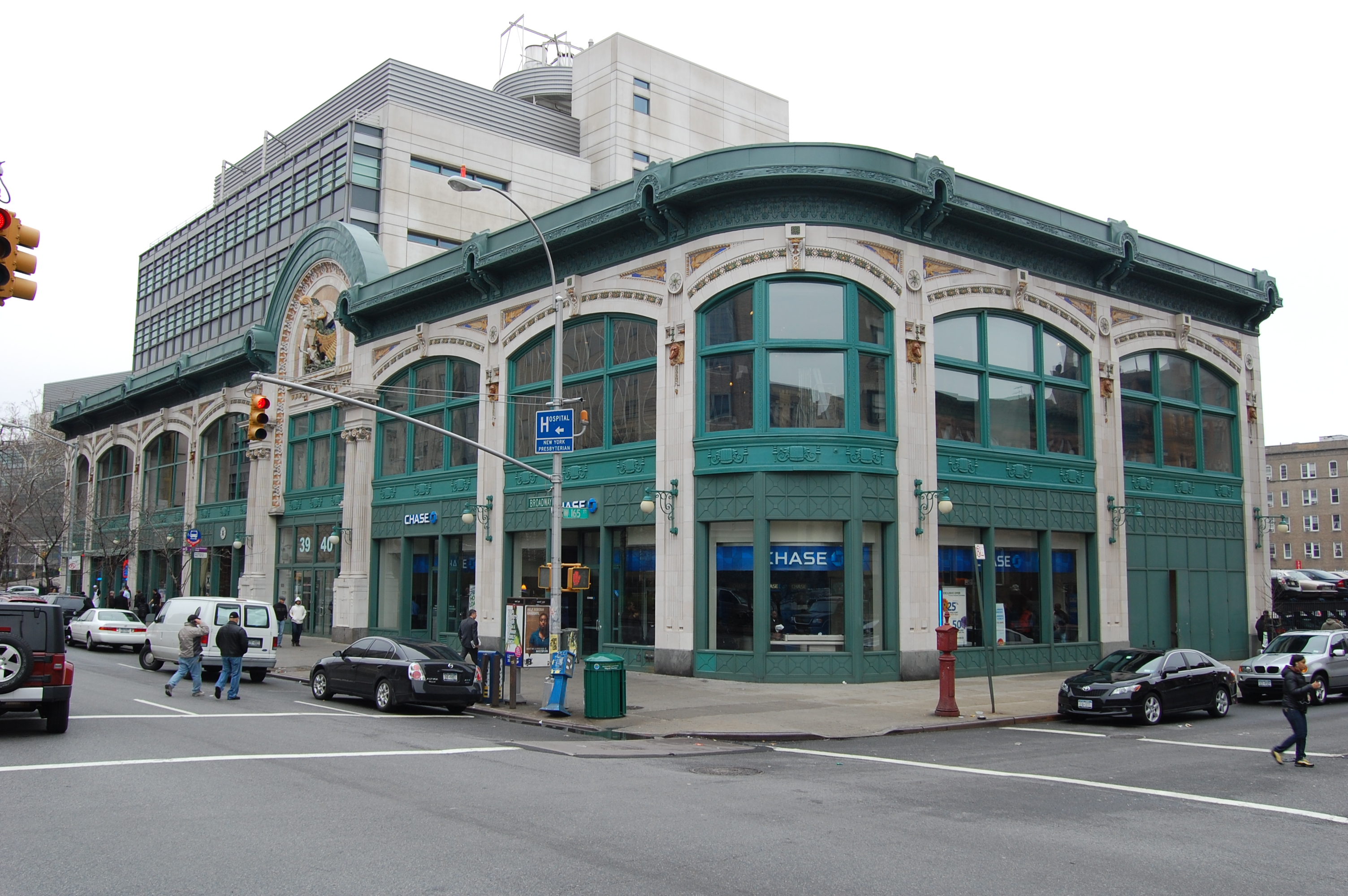
Audubon Business and Technology Center, showing the restored façade of the Audubon Ballroom

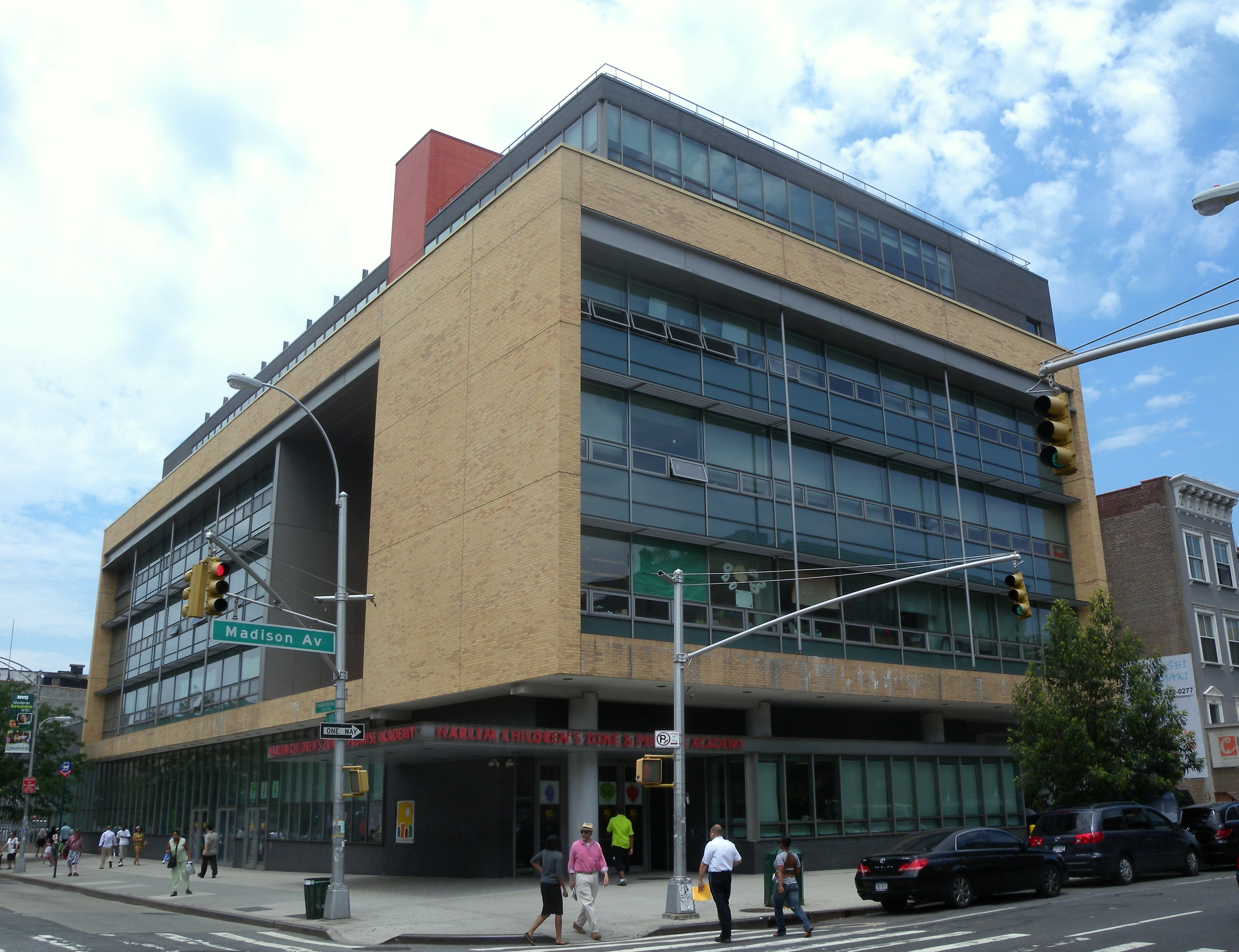
Harlem Children's Zone and Promise Academy

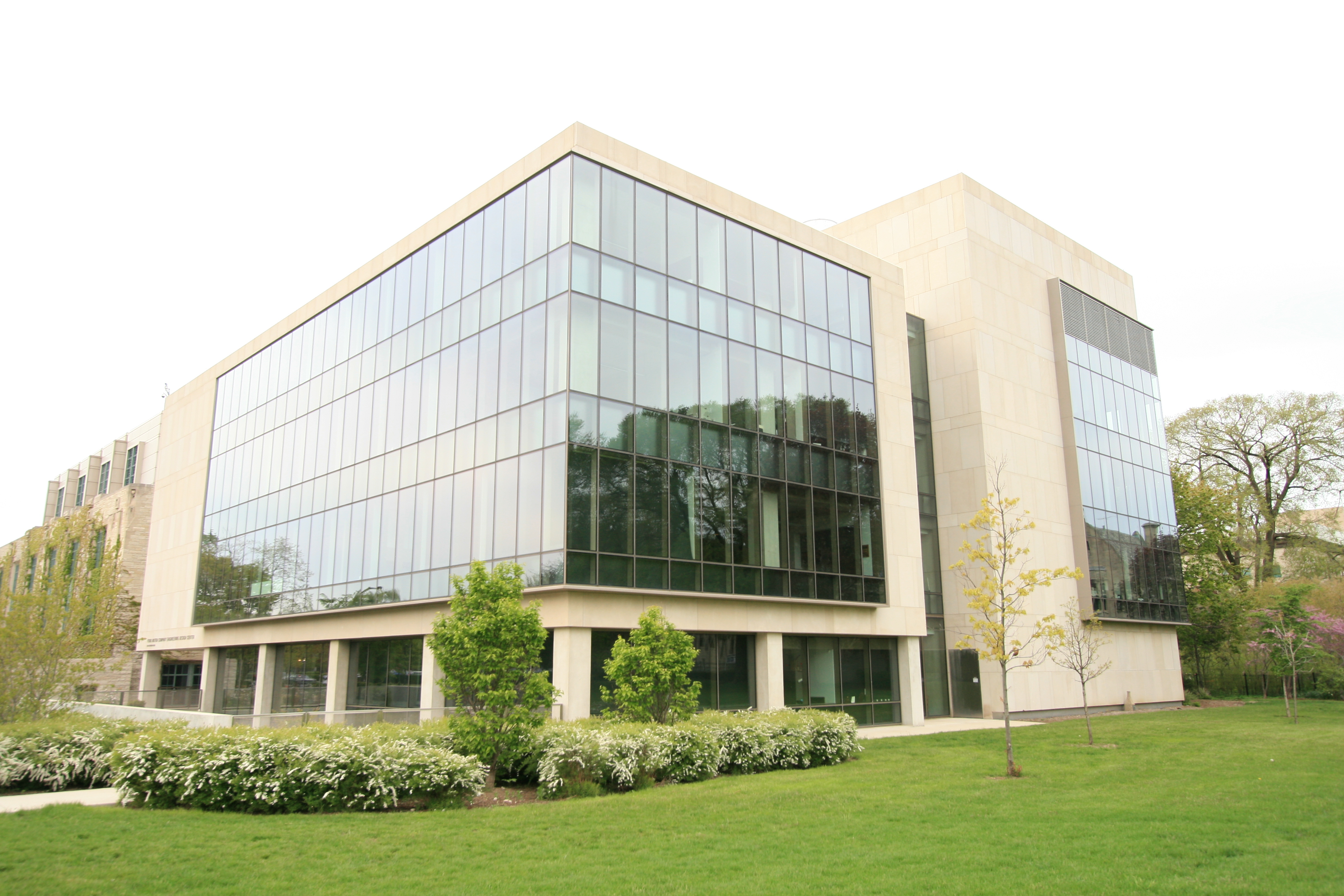
Ford Engineering Building, Northwestern University

Davis Brody Bond was an American architectural firm headquartered in New York City, New York, with additional offices in Washington, DC and São Paulo, Brazil. The firm was named for Lewis Davis, Samuel Brody, and J. Max Bond Jr. and was led by five partners: Steven M. Davis, William H. Paxson, Carl F. Krebs, Christopher K. Grabé, and David K. Williams.

The firm’s work encompassed architectural and urban design projects commissioned by major universities, as well as national, state, and local governments. Its portfolio also includes public, private, and institutional developments in the fields of housing, museums, healthcare, and education. Notable projects include the National September 11 Memorial & Museum, the Portico Gallery at the Frick Collection, and the National Museum of African American History and Culture.

== History ==
The firm was founded by Sam Brody, Lew Davis, and Chester Wisniewski in 1952 in New York. Davis, Brody and Wisniewski (now Davis Brody Bond) gained recognition by realizing social housing projects for New York City, such as Waterside Plaza. While the firm has expanded far beyond its original boundaries, the legacy of quality New York City work to the benefit of New Yorkers is still a keystone of the firm's design philosophy. After J. Max Bond Jr. joined the partnership in 1990, the firm became Davis Brody Bond in 1996. From 2006 to 2011 Davis Brody Bond was in partnership with Aedas. In 2010, Davis Brody Bond took an ownership interest in the architectural and interiors firm Spacesmith, a certified Women's Business Enterprise; the firms are housed together within the same office in New York.

In November 2023, Davis Brody Bond was acquired by Page. Subsequently, Page was acquired by Stantec in April 2025.

== Awards ==
Davis Brody Bond has been honored with more than 175 design awards including:

- Presidential Award for Design Excellence
- Architecture Firm Award, the highest honor given to an architectural practice by the American Institute of Architects
- Urban Land Institute Award for Excellence
- Thomas Jefferson Award for Public Architecture

== Notable projects ==
- Audubon Ballroom – historic preservation and addition
- Civic Hall at Union Square – technology hub in New York City
- District of Columbia Public Library Benning Library, Shaw Library
- East Midtown Plaza
- Frick Collection – addition of the Portico Gallery
- Manhattanville – phase I + II implementation of Columbia University's new campus
- National Mall – Union Square redesign
- National September 11 Memorial & Museum
- New York Public Library Main Branch – major renovations and addition of the South Court
- River Park Towers
- Ruppert Yorkville Towers
- Waterside Plaza
