= Ruppert Yorkville Towers =

Apartment building complex in Manhattan, New York

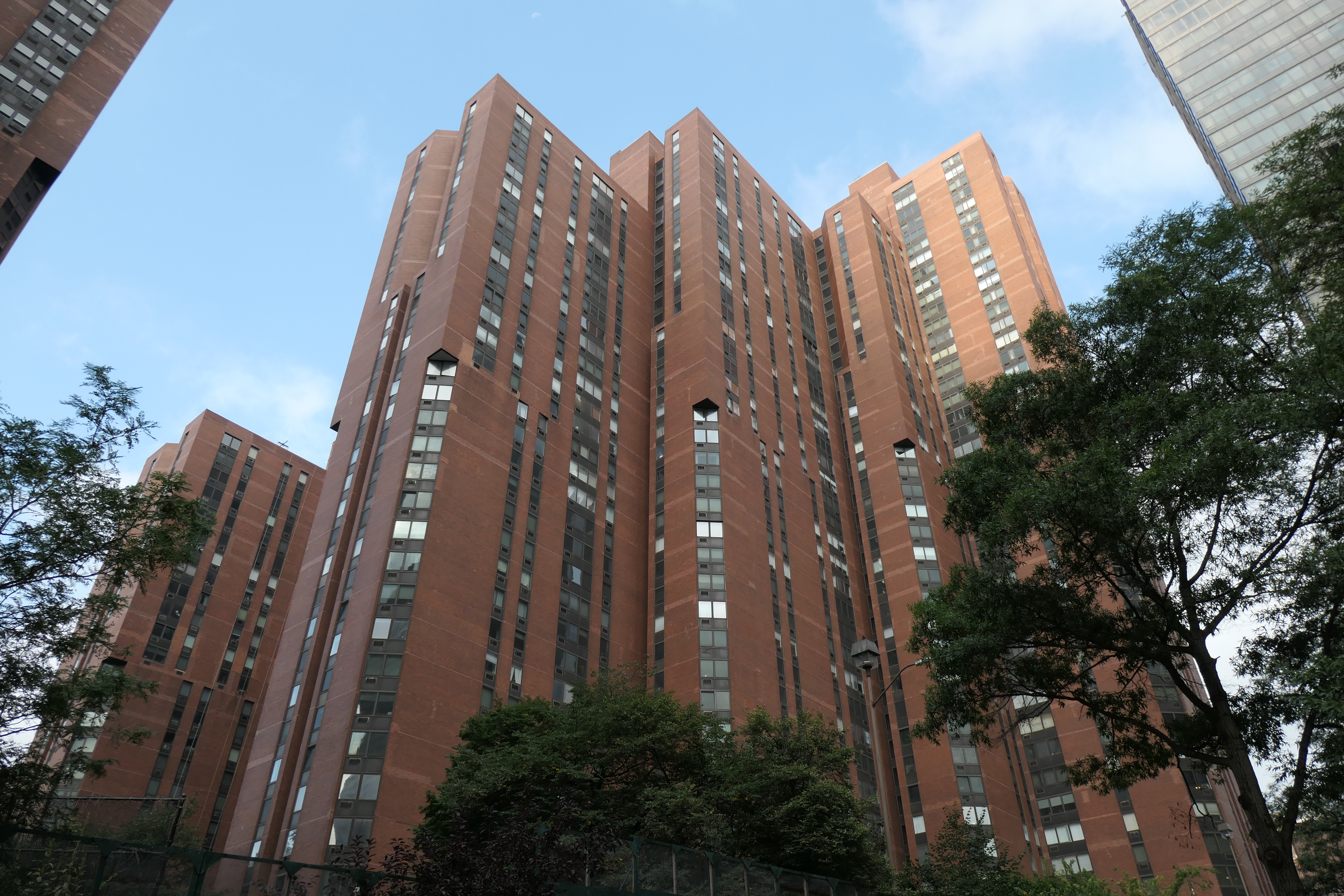
- Interactive map of the Ruppert Yorkville Towers area

General information
- Architectural style: Brutalist
- Location: Yorkville, Manhattan, New York City, United States
- Coordinates: 40.781591°N 73.950515°W
- Opened: 1974–1975

Technical details
- Floor count: 42 (Ruppert House & Yorkville Towers); 40 (Knickerbocker Plaza); 34 (Ruppert Towers)

Design and construction
- Architecture firm: Davis, Brody

The Ruppert Yorkville Towers are a high-rise apartment complex in Yorkville, Manhattan, New York City. It was completed between 1974 and 1975, on the site of the former Ruppert Brewery between 90th and 92nd Street and Second and Third Avenue.

The complex includes Ruppert Towers, Yorkville Towers, Knickerbocker Plaza, and Ruppert House. Ruppert and Yorkville Towers together have more than 1,200 apartments, while Knickerbocker Plaza has 578 and Ruppert House has 652. The buildings were designed in a brick "new brutalist" style by architectural firm Davis, Brody, who also designed Waterside Plaza.

The apartments opened as a mix of co-op and rental units under the Mitchell–Lama Housing Program for middle-income tenants. The opening of the large complex drove further development of the Yorkville neighborhood. The Ruppert and Yorkville Towers left the Mitchell–Lama program in January 2003 and were converted to condominiums. Under a deal with the owner, tenants were allowed to buy their apartments at a discount to market price, or remain as renters. Knickerbocker Plaza exited Mitchell–Lama in 2007, while Ruppert House remains in the program as of 2017.

== See also ==
- River Park Towers
