= Civic Hall at Union Square =

Civic technology space

Civic Hall at Union Square, also known as Civic Hall, is a center for Civic Tech in Manhattan, New York City, that provides tech resources to New Yorkers of all ages and backgrounds. The Civic Hall space at the Zero Irving Building (124 East 14th Street) occupies 85,000 square feet across seven floors. Civic Hall was founded in 2014 by entrepreneurs Andrew Rasiej and Micah Sifry.

Opened in November 2023, Civic Hall aims to provide resources for the city's technology industry. The Civic Hall rents classroom space, at below market rates to organizations and companies that provide workforce development with a focus on technology. Tenants include both for-profit and non-profit organizations, including LaGuardia Community College.

Civic Hall is a subsidiary of The Fedcap Group, a non-profit holding company consisting of 20 subsidiaries in the broad fields of healthcare, education, economic and workforce development.

== History ==
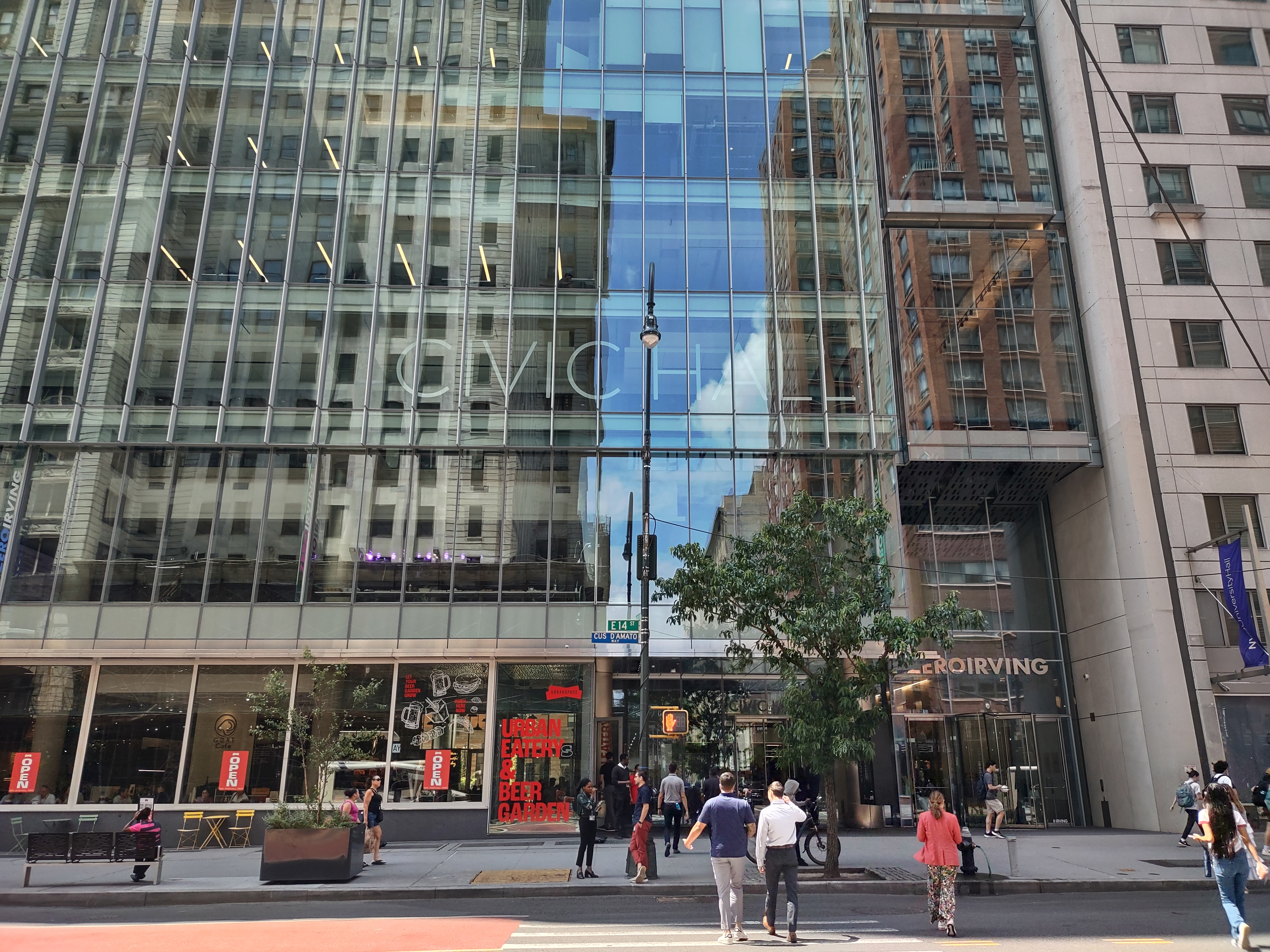
Civic Hall in the Zero building

The original location of Civic Hall was a 18,500-square-foot office at 156 Fifth Avenue.

Andrew Rasiej proposed the building project to the city in 2018. Rasiej led a unanimous Uniform Land Use Review Procedure (ULURP) approval process to up-zone the former location of a P.C. Richard & Son store on East 14th Street. The ULURP received unanimous approval in 2018 and the P.C. Richard & Son building was demolished. In 2023, the 21-story tech hub was completed.

The Zero Irving project was developed by RAL Development with Davis Brody Bond designing the building.

In November 2023, Mayor Eric Adams announced the opening of the Civic Hall space, calling it a "laboratory for the entire country."

== See also ==
- East 14th Street and Irving Place - ULURP Application
