= Waterside Plaza =

Building complex in Manhattan, New York

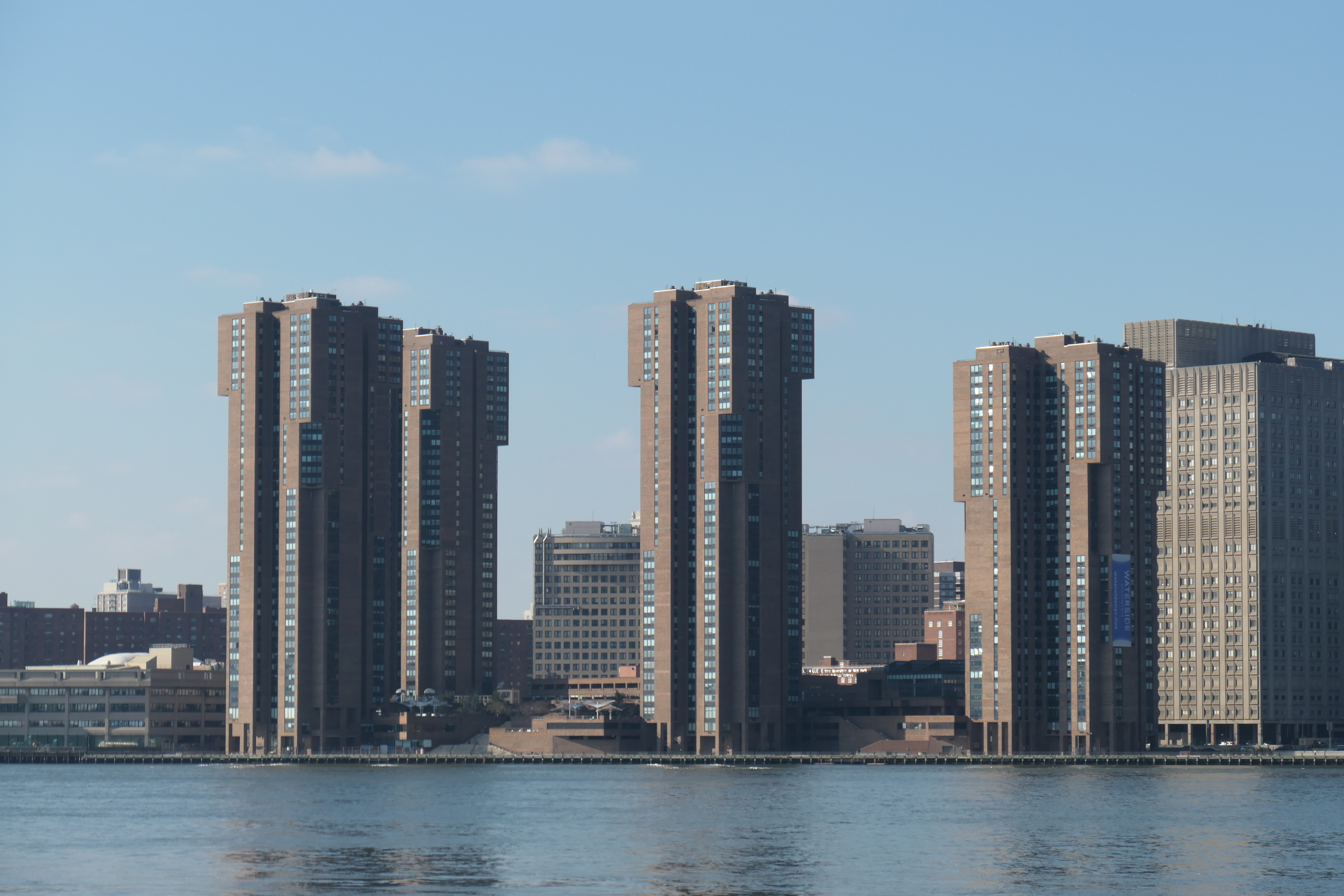
- Waterside Plaza from across the East River

General information
- Status: Completed
- Type: Residential
- Architectural style: Brutalist
- Location: Bounded by East River and FDR Drive from 25th to 30th streets, Manhattan, New York, United States
- Coordinates: 40.7374°N 73.9733°W
- Year built: 1971–1974
- Cost: $78 million
- Owner: Brookfield Properties
- Operator: Brookfield Properties

Technical details
- Floor count: 37 (10, 20 & 30 Waterside Plaza); 31 (40 Waterside Plaza)
- Grounds: 6 acres (2.4 ha)

Design and construction
- Architect: Davis, Brody & Associates
- Developer: HRH Construction Corporation; Longstreet Corporation
- Structural engineer: Robert Rosenwasser
- Services engineer: Cosentini Associates
- Main contractor: HRH Construction Corporation

Other information
- Number of units: 1,470
- Parking: 735 spaces

Website
- watersideplaza.com

Waterside Plaza is a residential and business complex located between the FDR Drive and the East River from 25th to 30th streets in the Kips Bay section of Manhattan, New York City. It was formerly a Mitchell-Lama Housing Program-funded rental project. The apartment buildings, as well as the neighboring United Nations International School, were constructed on top of platforms over the East River.

Waterside Plaza was constructed alongside a segment of the FDR Drive that was built on landfill brought to the United States from England. Developed by Richard Ravitch, the first apartment buildings opened in 1973 and the complex was completed the following year. The housing development received the Construction Achievement Project of the Year Award from the Metropolitan Section of the American Society of Civil Engineers in 1974. There were plans to build additional above-water apartments, offices, and a hotel to the south of the site in the 1980s, but these were canceled, and Stuyvesant Cove Park was developed there instead.

The complex is made up of four residential towers as well as a row of duplex townhouses, clad in brown brickwork, that encompass a large plaza overlooking the East River. Three of the towers are 37 stories high and one tower has 31 stories. There are 1,470 residential units along with a health club and a parking garage. Waterside Plaza has won the Albert S. Bard Award for Distinguished Architecture and Urban Design, as well as an Honor Award from the American Institute of Architects.

== History ==
=== Planning ===
Waterside Plaza was constructed alongside a segment of the FDR Drive that was built on landfill brought to the United States as ships' ballast from the rubble of the city of Bristol in England, which was bombed by the Luftwaffe in World War II during the Bristol Blitz. The area is known as "Bristol Basin" and a memorial to the use of rubble from Bristol was erected in 1942 by the English-Speaking Union of the United States on a footbridge across the highway; the plaque was later relocated to Waterside Plaza in 1974.

The development of Waterside Plaza was first envisioned in 1961 by Richard Ravitch of the HRH Construction Corporation. While having lunch with architect Lewis Davis at the end of the parking garage at the Skyport Marina, a project that Ravitch constructed at the foot of 23rd Street that opened the following year, the two discussed a newspaper article in which United States Ambassador to the United Nations Adlai Stevenson complained about a lack of housing for staff working at the UN headquarters; Ravitch suggested solving the problem by building housing along the waterfront to the north of the marina.

Ravitch approached James Felt, the head of the New York City Planning Commission, in the spring of 1961 to discuss his idea but he was told, "Don't waste your time." Ravitch dusted off his plans two years later when he learned that William F. R. Ballard, the new chair of the City Planning Commission, was supportive of waterfront development. However, plans for Ravitch's proposed development were kept quiet because the city had plans to condemn buildings for the controversial Bellevue South urban renewal project, located nearby between 23rd and 30th streets, and the Waterside project would involve constructing new housing over the river without the need to displace any existing tenants.

The waterfront site opposite Bellevue Hospital was identified as a potential location for housing and recreational use in a 1965 report issued by the Department of City Planning, which noted that waterfront development should be complementary to other renewal efforts and not meant as a substitute for Bellevue South. The report also recommended that the city retain ownership of the land used for waterfront development and arrange for a long-term lease; this would require legislative changes to allow for leases longer than 25 years, giving developers enough time to pay off the cost of their improvements.

In order to obtaining financing to construct housing over this section of the East River, Title 33 of the United States Code was amended in 1965 to designate the segment of the river from 17th to 30th streets within the pierhead line as non-navigable, so the federal government could not expropriate the property under its powers to regulate navigable waters. The matter to change the designation of the river along the Manhattan shoreline had been brought before Congress at the request of Mayor Robert F. Wagner Jr. by Emanuel Celler, a member of the U.S. House of Representatives from New York's 10th congressional district.

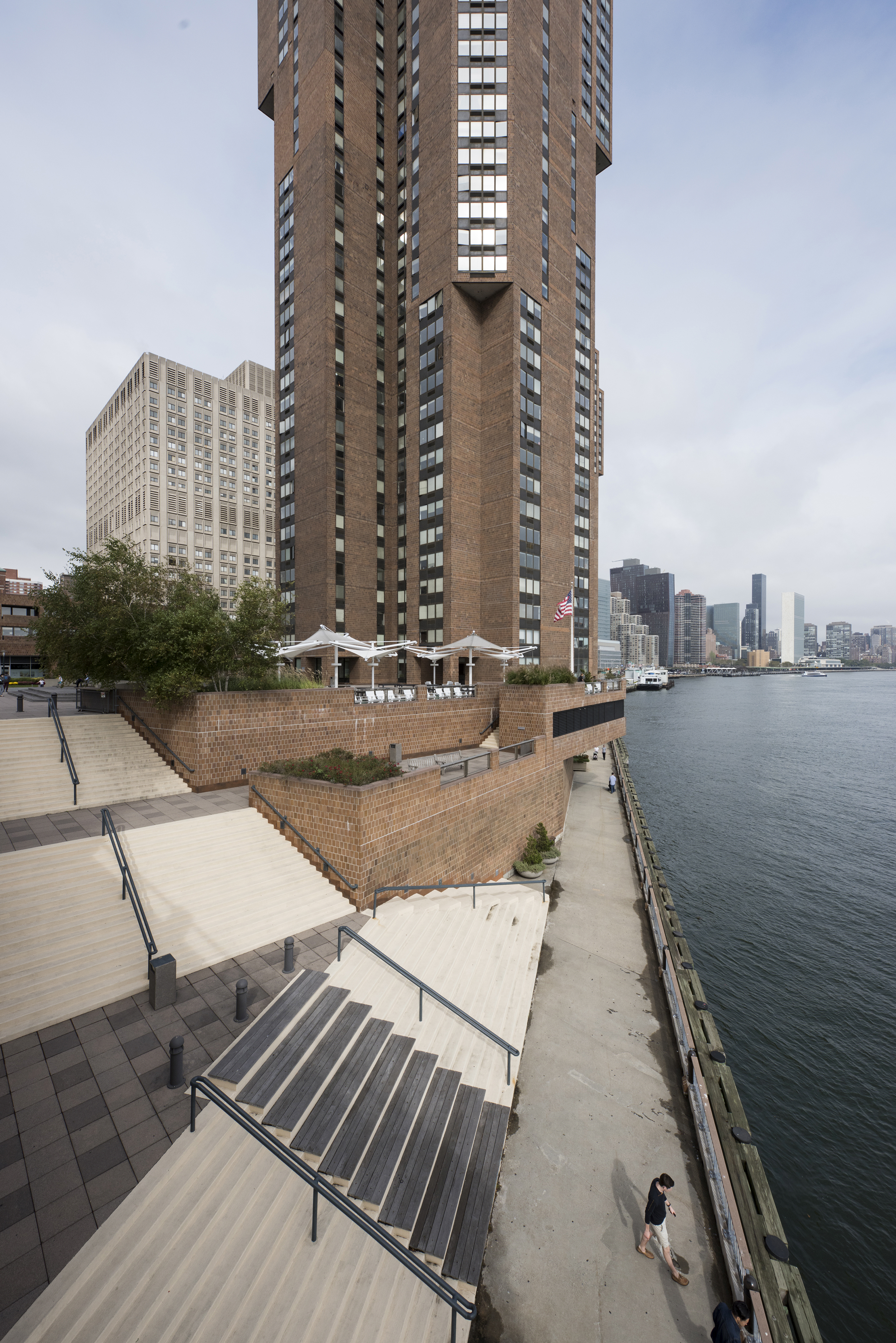
Steps leading down to the river from the central plaza, with the Secretariat Building in the background

Plans for Waterside were first announced by Mayor John Lindsay on December 20, 1966. Initially estimated at a cost of $42 million, the project sponsored by the HRH Construction Company and designed by Davis, Brody & Associates was to contain a total of 1,450 apartments, some of which would be reserved for United Nations staff. Waterside was approved by the City Planning Commission on April 12, 1967. Beverly Moss Spatt was the only member of the commission to vote against the project, which she called, "a reversal of city policy and commitment of not granting tax abatement for housing when rents are equivalent to units now available and renting on the private market."

Although Waterside was intended to provide housing to a mix of lower, middle, and upper-income residents, opponents of the project criticized the city subsidies that were being offered to the developer when less than five percent of the apartments were to be for low-income families (70 units were to be for low-income residents, 280 for middle-income residents, and 1,118 for upper-income residents). The planned subsidies included the developer leasing the land from the city at no cost and only having to pay half of the residential real estate taxes. Meanwhile, supporters of Waterside argued that the subsidies were needed in order for the project to move forward, and that it was located on a site that currently produced no revenue to the city. The project sponsors—the HRH Construction Company and the Longstreet Corporation—subsequently suggested increasing the total of low-income units to 145, swapping 75 of the middle-income units with low-income units to make up for the difference. With these amendments, the project was approved by the New York City Board of Estimate on December 22, 1967.

The next step in the process involved obtaining financing for the project. Waterside's developers made a deal with the United Nations Development Corporation (UNDC) to give relocation priority to residents and businesses that would be displaced by the construction of the U.N. Center, a proposed mixed-use development with office space and hotel rooms that was being planned in the Turtle Bay neighborhood near the headquarters of the United Nations (now part of the complex that includes One, Two and Three United Nations Plaza). The agreement was made in exchange for UNDC backing the Waterside development with tax-exempt bonds. Almost 600 of the apartments at Waterside were to be reserved for residents that would be displaced by the proposed U.N. Center, many of which lived in the Beaux-Arts Apartments on East 44th Street. The UNDC subsequently revised its plans for the U.N. Center to build on a smaller footprint that did not involve razing the Beaux-Arts Apartments.

Plans for the buildings were filed with the city in 1969. The development of Waterside was originally intended to be privately funded, but the project got stalled because its sponsors had difficulties in obtaining financing due to the effects of inflation and a tightened market for loans with high interest rates. On June 24, 1970, the City Planning Commission approved a revision to the project that involved the city taking over Waterside's financing through the Mitchell–Lama Housing Program after construction of the apartment complex had been completed. The city was unable to finance the project's construction because it was reaching its limits on debt for housing and renewal projects. In 1971, a group of nine banks agreed to lend a total of $71.58 million over a three-year period to finance the construction of Waterside. Led by Chase Manhattan Bank, the other banks providing construction loans included Bankers Trust, Chemical Bank, First National City Bank, Franklin National, Irving Trust, Manufacturers Hanover Trust, Marine Midland Grace, and Morgan Guaranty Trust. The lease with the city was to run for a period of 99 years, after which the property and its improvements were to be returned to the city.

=== Construction and opening ===
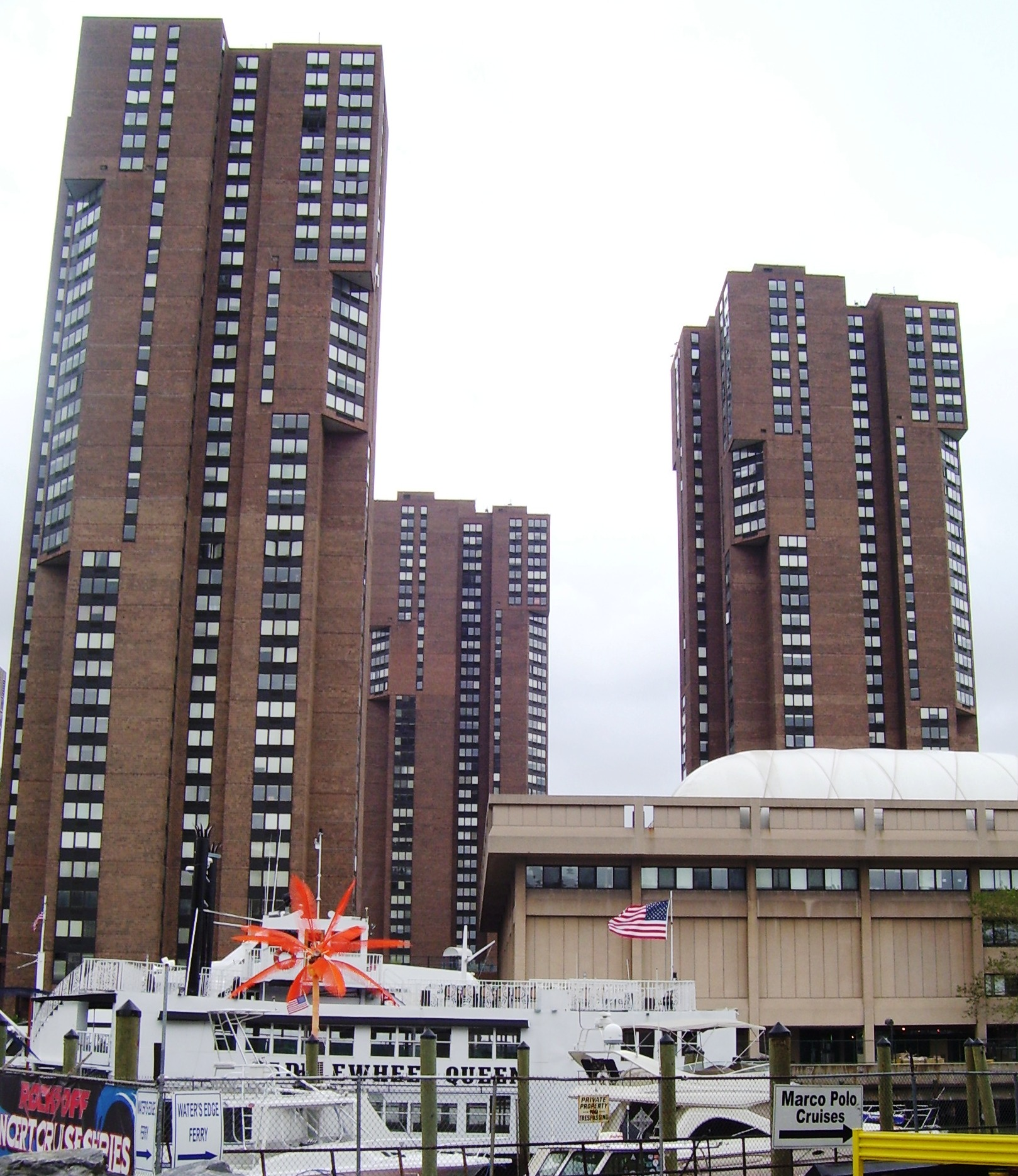
Three of the four towers viewed from the south, with the United Nations International School in the foreground

The apartment buildings at Waterside were constructed on top of a 6-acre (2.4 ha) platform supported by over 2,000 piles that were sunk into the East River beginning in January 1971. Composite piles were used, which consisted of concrete members in the upper sections fastened together with steel H-beams in the lower members that ran from the riverbed down to bedrock. The platform was built next to another deck that had been previously constructed for the planned site of the United Nations International School with a $1.1-million grant from the Rockefeller Brothers Fund. On May 5, 1969, the deck of the future school site had been used as the landing field for a Hawker Siddeley Harrier vertical take-off and landing jet operated by the Royal Air Force in the Daily Mail Trans-Atlantic Air Race from London to New York City.

The first apartment buildings at the site opened in 1973 and the $78-million complex was completed the following year with the opening of the northern tower. Waterside was formally opened on September 12, 1973, when Mayor Lindsay, former Mayor Wagner, and other dignitaries boarded a fireboat at the South Street Seaport and headed up the East River to attend the ceremony. At the event, Mayor Lindsay presented architect Lewis Davis and developer Richard Ravitch with the city's 75th Anniversary Golden Jubilee Medal in recognition of their contributions. The city began celebrating its 75th anniversary earlier in the year, which marked the consolidation of the five boroughs into modern New York City in 1898.

The pedestrian overpass across the FDR Drive at 25th Street was originally built in the 1940s. When the Waterside project was being completed in 1974, there were plans to construct an additional footbridge across the highway at the northern end of the complex. Preliminary designs for a pedestrian overpass connecting to 30th Street were prepared and funding for the $300,000 structure was to be obtained from the federally-assisted mortgage for the 375 units in the northern building; this building was financed through the Section 236 program of the Housing and Urban Development Act of 1968. However, the location of the proposed footbridge was opposed by officials at Bellevue Hospital, which felt that a pedestrian overpass at 27th Street would be a better option because people walking to and from First Avenue would be passing through an area monitored by the hospital's security personnel and that it would also provide better connections to existing and planned public transportation services. At that time, plans for the construction of a southern extension of the Second Avenue Subway (running between 34th and Whitehall streets) called for a new station to be built on Second Avenue between 23rd and 27th streets.

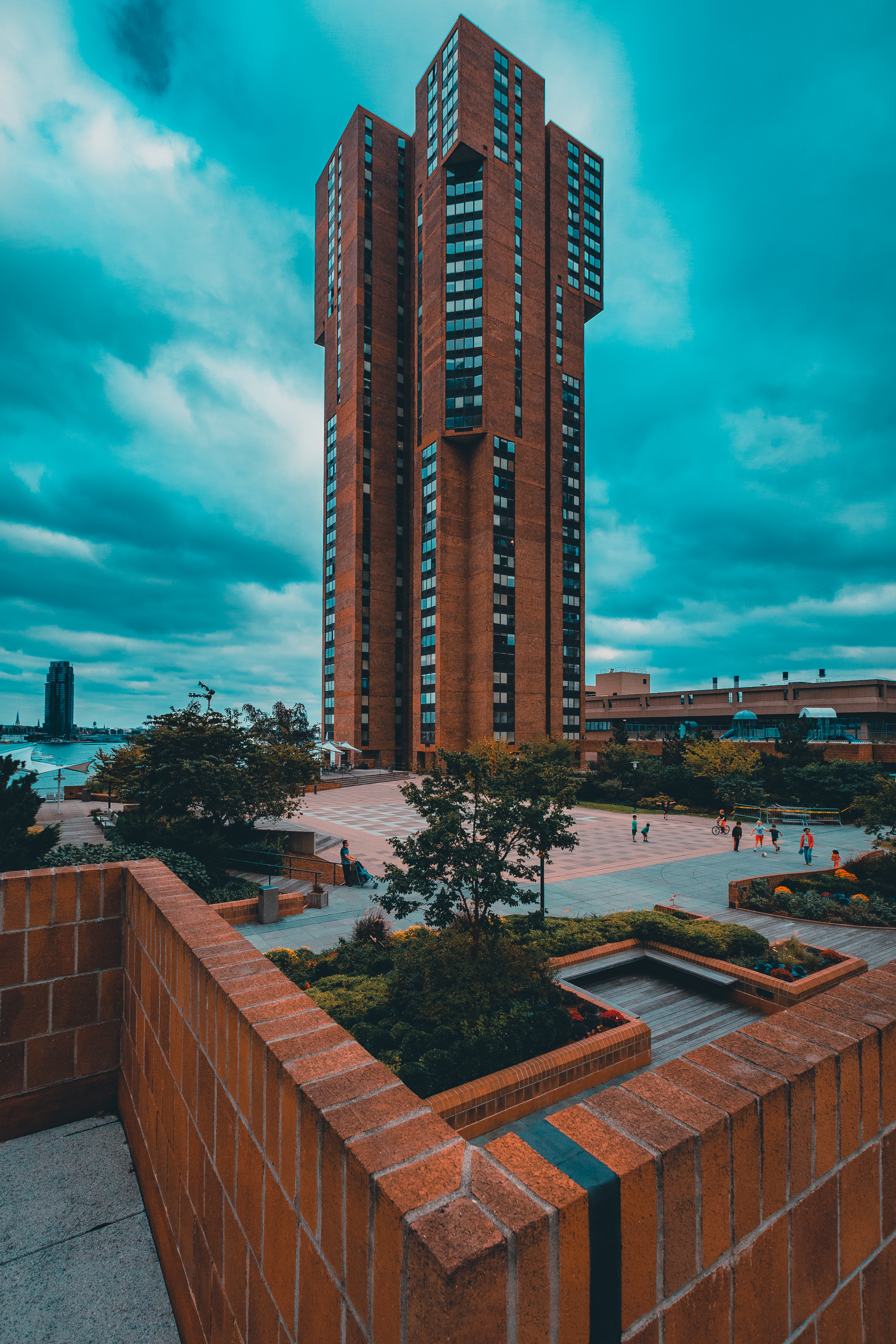
View to the southeast of the central plaza and 20 Waterside Plaza

There were plans to build River Walk, a development with additional above-water apartments, offices, and a hotel to the south of the site in the 1980s, but environmental concerns and community opposition doomed the project and led to the development of Stuyvesant Cove Park in its place. Tenants of Waterside Plaza, along with residents living in Stuyvesant Town and Peter Cooper Village as well as the neighboring communities, had formed a group called Citizens United Against Riverwalk to fight against the proposed project. Davis, Brody & Associates, the designer of Waterside Plaza, served as the architect for the River Walk project beginning in 1982.

In the mid-1990s, it was estimated that the housing complex would need about $20 million in repairs to fix deteriorated pilings and beams in the platform supporting the structure as well as other repairs to the bricks used in the buildings' facade. The developer proposed raising tenant rents by 55% to cover the cost of the repairs. The deterioration to the structures was identified by engineers and attributed to the location of the housing complex over the river and its exposed position to weather conditions. Some of the tenants were suspicious that the developer was trying to raise rents in order to increase the market value of the complex and then sell it as a co-op. The rent increases were challenged in court by the Waterside Tenants Association and the developer agreed to settle the case in 1997 by offering lower rent increases compared to those that had been approved by the New York City Department of Housing Preservation and Development.

In 1999, the developer notified tenants that it was preparing to withdraw from the Mitchell–Lama Housing Program, a process in which developers could exit the program after 20 years by paying off their mortgage and then begin charging market rents to tenants. The process of Waterside exiting the Mitchell–Lama Housing Program was complicated because the timing of its construction coincided with changes to state rent laws, making only buildings constructed before 1974 covered by rent stabilization. The developer considered the entire complex to be exempt from rent stabilization since its last two towers opened in 1974, while the tenants argued that the entire complex should be covered by rent stabilization since the first two towers opened in 1973. This complication led to both parties settling the matter instead of taking the case to court and risk losing their argument. Ravitch ended up brokering a deal with the city to obtain property tax breaks in exchange for agreeing to reduce the proposed annual rent increases for tenants and keep them below market levels.

In 2004, Waterside Management Company LLC launched a three-year capital improvement program with a cost in excess of $35 million. The capital improvement program included upgrades to all new apartments as they became vacant as well as all hallways and each building's reception and concierge areas. The plaza itself was re-waterproofed and repaved and extensive park-like landscaping added. The health club, parking facilities, and security system were also upgraded.

In January 2019, the New York City Council approved legislation to preserve 325 units in the complex as affordable housing through 2098, to give rent protections to certain residents who lived at Waterside prior to its exit from the Mitchell–Lama Housing Program in 2001, and to extend the housing complex's ground lease with the city to run through 2118 (the original 99-year lease had been set to expire in 2069). The actions came as a result of prior negotiations that Ravitch had with the city to extend Waterside's ground lease in order to refinance the mortgage on the property. In October 2021, Ravitch sold his remaining stake of Waterside Plaza to Brookfield Asset Management for $582 million, and Brookfield took over full ownership and management of the housing complex. Brookfield had initially purchased a share of Waterside in 2018.

== Features ==
=== Design and architecture ===
Waterside Plaza
List of numbered map items:
1 10 Waterside Plaza
2 15 Waterside Plaza
3 20 Waterside Plaza
4 25 Waterside Plaza
5 30 Waterside Plaza
6 35 Waterside Plaza
7 40 Waterside Plaza
8 25th Street Footbridge
9 Central Plaza
10 Parking Garage
11 Waterfront Promenade
12 United Nations International School

The complex is made up of four residential towers as well as a row of duplex townhouses, clad in brown brickwork, that encompass a two-acre (0.81 ha) plaza overlooking the East River. Three of the towers (10, 20 & 30 Waterside Plaza) are 37 stories high and the northern tower (40 Waterside Plaza) has 31 stories. There are 1,470 residential units along with a health club (35 Waterside Plaza, open to non-residents) and a parking garage. Each tower has its main entrance located at the same level as the elevated public plaza; the buildings also have a second entrance on the lower level of the complex. Waterside Plaza's retail space is occupied by a Gristedes supermarket and several other shops located under the row of townhouses. The British International School of New York was established at Waterside Plaza in 2006 and rents several large commercial spaces in the complex. The United Nations International School is located to the south of Waterside Plaza on a campus that opened in 1973.

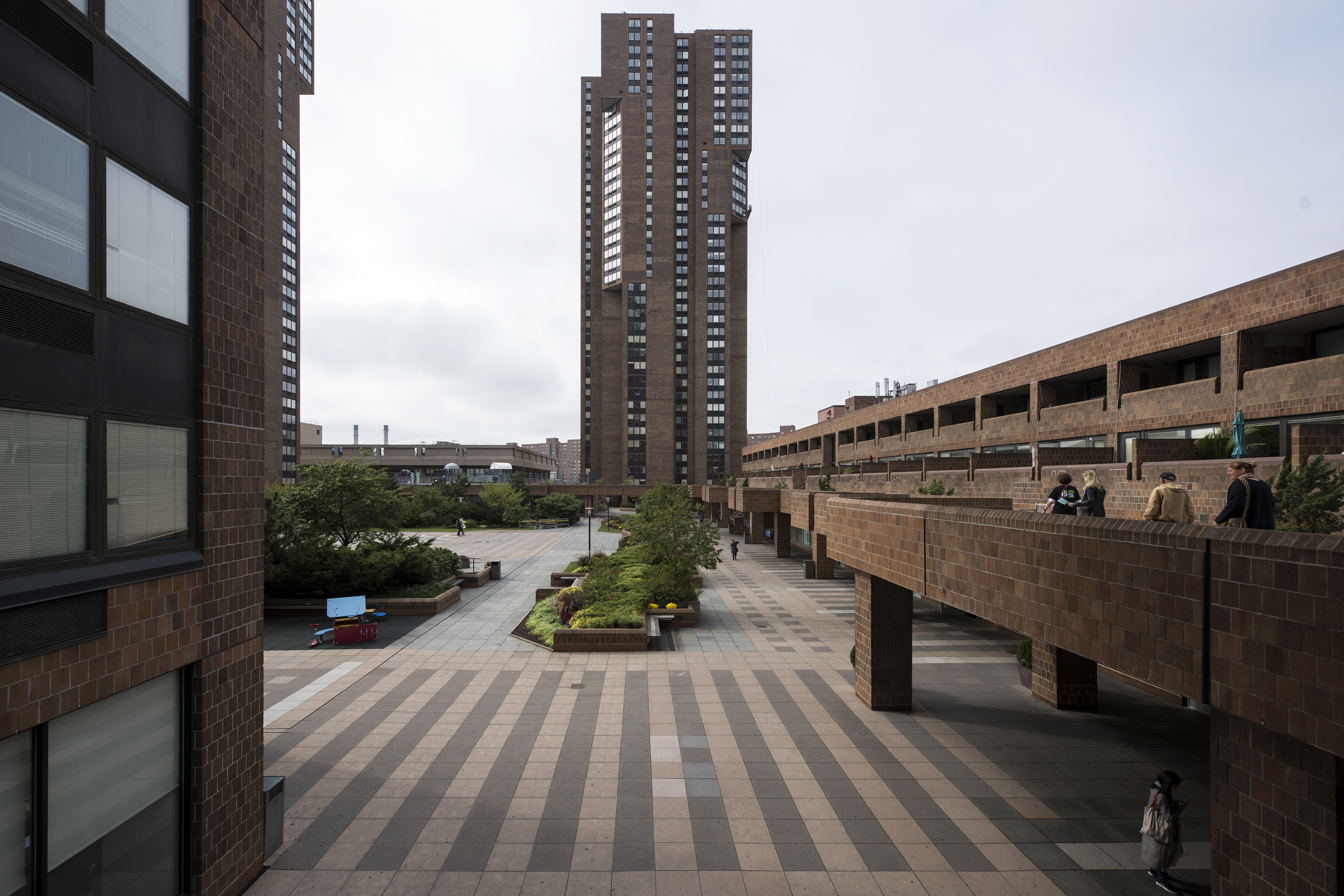
View to south of the central plaza, duplexes, and elevated promenade

The row of duplex townhouses located on the west side of the complex (25 Waterside Plaza) was designed to shield the interior central plaza from the FDR Drive and is raised one story above the shops and main plaza, the latter of which has steps leading down to a walkway along the edge of the river. An elevated promenade, intended to be primarily used by tenants, runs alongside the townhouses' private terraces and provides a raised connection between the four towers and health club.

Each of the towers was designed to widen towards the top of the building and employs a pinwheel-shaped floor plan. This was done to increase the number of corner rooms to improve residents' views and to add more floor area to the upper levels that had the best overall views, which accommodate up to three-bedroom apartments. The complex was constructed using large bricks that had been developed for Davis, Brody & Associates' Riverbend project, which helped in speeding the brickwork and also allowed bricks to turn corners without special sizes. The towers have vertical bands of windows set in black casings and black spandrel panels, which provide contrast to vertical lines of blank facade.

=== Site access ===
Waterside is accessible to vehicles only by entering from 23rd Street. Cars and trucks leaving Waterside can do so via 23rd Street or driving along a service road to 34th Street. Prior to changes to the area roadway network associated with the development of Stuyvesant Cove Park in the early 2000s, the only point of vehicular egress from the complex had been via the northbound service road to 34th Street. A footbridge at East 25th Street allows safe passage across the FDR Drive to the west. The existing footbridge is planned to be replaced with an ADA compliant pedestrian overpass as part of the development of a health and life sciences hub on the west side of the FDR Drive. Waterside also contains the first two stops on the M34A Select Bus Service route.

Waterside is Manhattan's only residential complex located east of the FDR Drive. The East River Greenway passes between the two and also provides access to the complex for pedestrians and cyclists traveling from other points to the north and south. The waterfront south of Waterside Plaza, Stuyvesant Cove Park, which is part of the Greenway, includes a small manmade land mass extending out into the East River, which was created from excess cement dumped into the river.

== Impact ==
=== Reception ===
When plans for Waterside were first announced by Mayor Lindsay in December 1966, The New York Times architectural critic Ada Louise Huxtable was very excited about the project, calling it "a trend-setter for New York in every sense of the term" and noted that it "could be the city's first large-scale breakthrough from the norm of sterile housing cliches and arid open space that has been the bureaucratic or easy-profit formula."

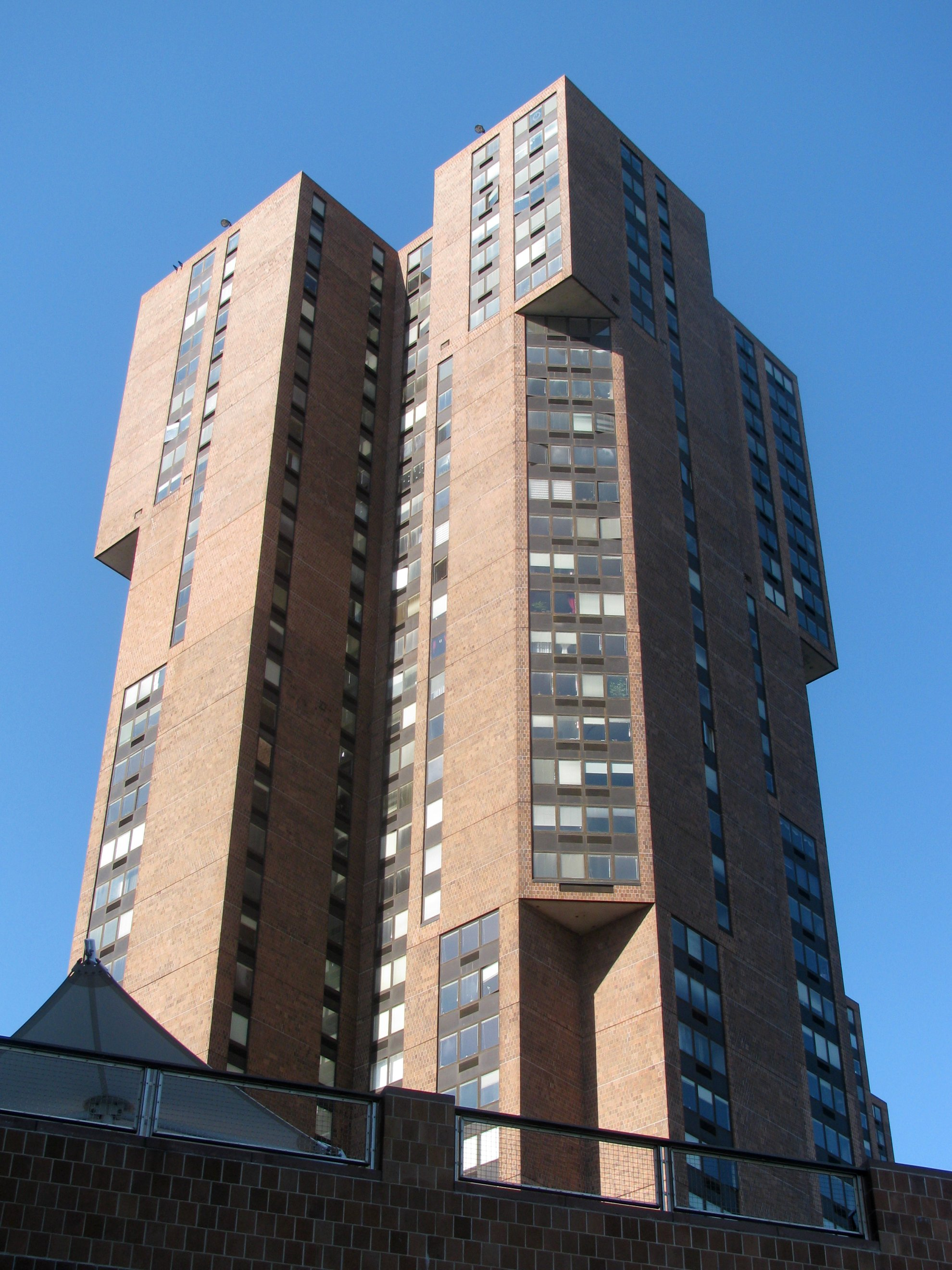
The tower's corners vary from being cut out, chamfered, and protruding

In 1975, the year after the project was completed, The New York Times architectural critic Paul Goldberger called the tower's varying floor plans—which widen with increasing height, starting with corners cut out from the lower floors, chamfered corners on the middle floors, and protruding corners on the upper floors—"a visually exciting form, a powerful anchor to the skyline at the water's edge." However, he also pointed out some of the drawbacks of the complex, such as its poor accessibility and isolation as well as the desolate nature of its large central plaza. In his 1979 book The City Observed, New York, a Guide to the Architecture of Manhattan, Goldberger described the footbridge across the FDR Drive as "especially irritating, since it feels like a drawbridge over a moat" and called the central plaza as having "a desperate need for landscaping" since it "is psychologically cold on even the warmest summer's day." However, he praised the views from the complex's waterfront promenade, saying that it "makes up for many of the sins of the rest of the public space."

In 2001, The New York Times architectural critic Herbert Muschamp described Waterside as a "great urban composition" that is "picturesque and historically informed." He compared the high-rise apartment buildings to the towers of San Gimignano, with the East River and FDR Drive taking the place of the walls that protected the Italian medieval hill town.

=== Awards & honors ===
The housing development received the Construction Achievement Project of the Year Award from the Metropolitan Section of the American Society of Civil Engineers in 1974. In 1975, Waterside won the Albert S. Bard Award for Distinguished Architecture and Urban Design. A year later, it won an Honor Award from the American Institute of Architects. In 2004, the Municipal Art Society placed Waterside on its "30 Under 30", a watch list of future landmarks.

=== Design influence ===
Waterside Plaza's sister developments are the River Park Towers, a residential housing complex in the Bronx, and the Ruppert Yorkville Towers on the Upper East Side, both also designed by Davis, Brody & Associates. Waterside has also served as an influence for other projects in New York City, including waterfront developments in Battery Park City and on the opposite site of the East River (Queens West in Long Island City and Williamsburg, Brooklyn), the method used for leasing agreements of city-owned land in Battery Park City and on Roosevelt Island, and the financing of Via Verde in the Melrose section of the Bronx.

== Events ==
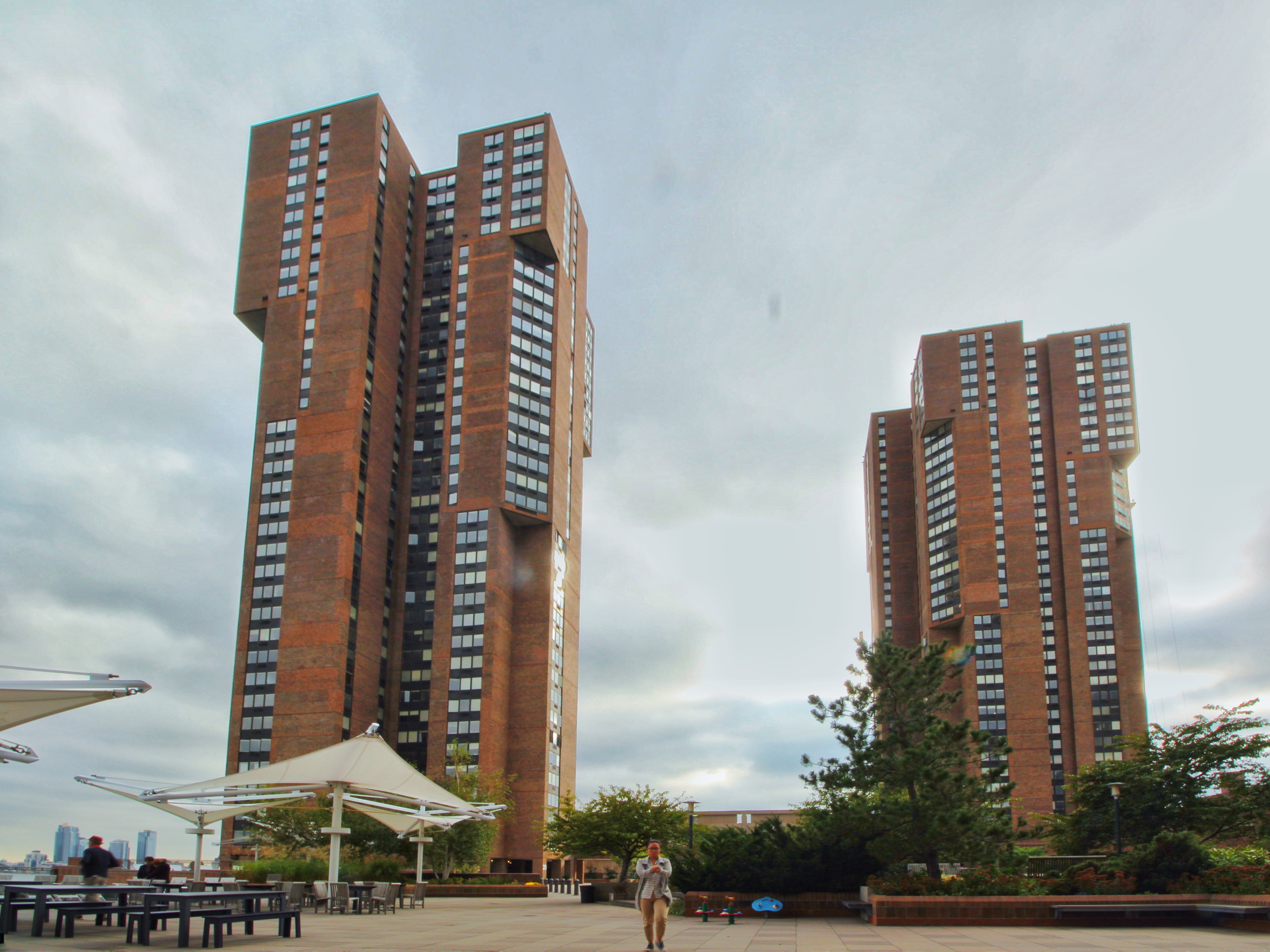
Two of the four towers looking south from the central plaza

Waterside Plaza hosts year-round events that are free and open to the public. The most popular are the outdoor summer concerts in July and the outdoor Monday night movies in August. Other events include monthly playreadings, a short play festival, a dance festival, a spring flea market, and an electronic recycling day.

From the mid-1970s through the 1980s, the central plaza hosted a series of contemporary sculpture exhibitions organized by arts activist Doris Freedman for the Public Arts Council. These included exhibitions by Kenneth Snelson and Pierre Clerk, the latter of which included four works specifically created for display at the venue. In 2008, Waterside Plaza hosted the Make Music New York festival, during which 17 bands performed concerts on three different stages – on the waterside, in the gardens, and on the plaza.

Other notable events have included P. F. Chang's holding of a charity event on the roof of one of Waterside's high-rise buildings on June 28, 2010, during which professional golfers Annika Sörenstam and Briny Baird and golf pro Don Vickery took turns driving golf balls at a target floating in the East River. The event raised a total of $100,000 for several charities including the Intrepid Fallen Heroes Fund. The year before, Vickery became the first double amputee to earn certification from the Professional Golfers' Association of America; he started playing golf after he lost both of his legs in an accident and ended up becoming an assistant professional at a golf course on Wilmington Island, Georgia.
