= River Park Towers =

Residential skyscrapers in the Bronx, New York

Coordinates: 40.851579°N 73.923216°W

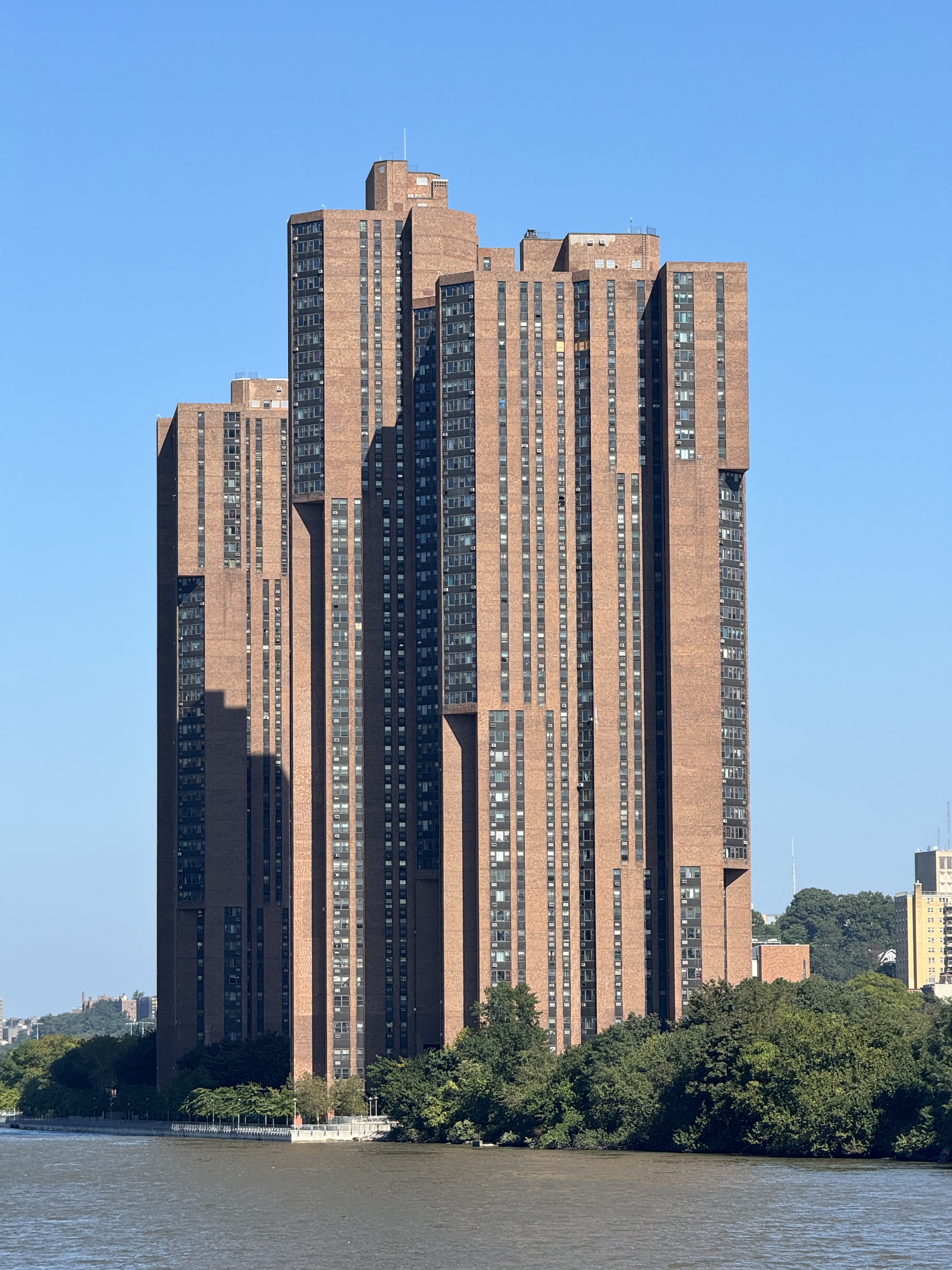
The high-rise complex, taken from the Harlem Greenway in October 2023

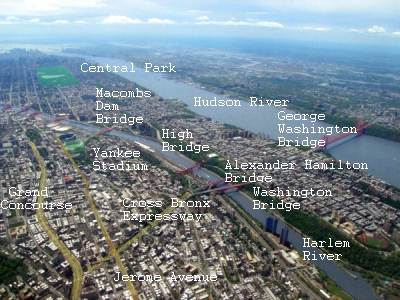
A diagram of the Harlem River. Although not labeled, the towers are the two tall buildings to the left of the river, in the bottom right corner (on the east bank).

River Park Towers or the Harlem River Park Towers are two 38-story, and two 44-story residential buildings in the Morris Heights neighborhood of the Bronx borough in New York City. Completed in 1975, they became the tallest buildings in the borough, ahead of Tracey Towers and the multiple high-rises encompassing Co-op City. Currently, no other building in the Bronx has exceeded this height. Designed by Davis, Brody & Associates, both buildings were built with the intention to provide affordable, yet somewhat modern housing to the working class. It is built in the same vertically articulated style with "eight-inch-square, rusty-brown 'super bricks'" as Waterside Plaza and the Ruppert Yorkville Towers, both of which were also built around the same time period by the same design firm.

== Construction ==
In 1955, the Mitchell-Lama Housing Program was signed into law. This program encouraged subsidized housing and many such projects sprung up throughout the city and state. With companies created to specialize in such projects, loans of around 90% to 95% of each project's cost were given. In addition, state bonds with low interest rates allowed rents to be relatively low despite providing modern amenities. This allowed the River Park Towers, two modern skyscrapers, to be constructed while housing middle-income tenants.

The area purchased (at a very low price) was industrial, with the Metro-North Railroad's Hudson Line, the Major Deegan Expressway, and the Harlem River nearby for transportation. The towers are not far from other high-rises, though they are far taller than their companions. The Towers are located in Morris Heights, a residential neighborhood in the Bronx, at 10, 20, 30, and 40 Richman Plaza. The Towers were sponsored by the New York State Urban Development Corporation, a public agency created by the act of the same name in 1968. Due to this sponsorship, work could commence here. The towers were completed in 1975.

== History ==
=== 21st century ===
By the year 2020, incidents of violence had decreased from its 1980s heyday, but drugs and gangs remained a problem. It was reported that residents often had to wait for up to an hour for the elevators, which broke down frequently, "with people crowding the hallways like commuters trying to push into the subway at rush hour." Monthly rent for a four-bedroom apartment in the towers reportedly cost $1,978, with 70 percent of the 5,000 tenants receiving rent subsidies.

The Take down Eventually, these three sets united under the name No Luv City (NLC), becoming a notorious gang involved in narcotics trafficking, weapons distribution, carjackings, and homicides. In 2011, a major indictment dubbed “Operation No Luv” led to the arrest of 43 members—including Tally Gz, Hulk Brim, and Five Blaze—in one of the Bronx’s biggest gang takedowns.
