= Tracey Towers =

Residential skyscraper in the Bronx, New York

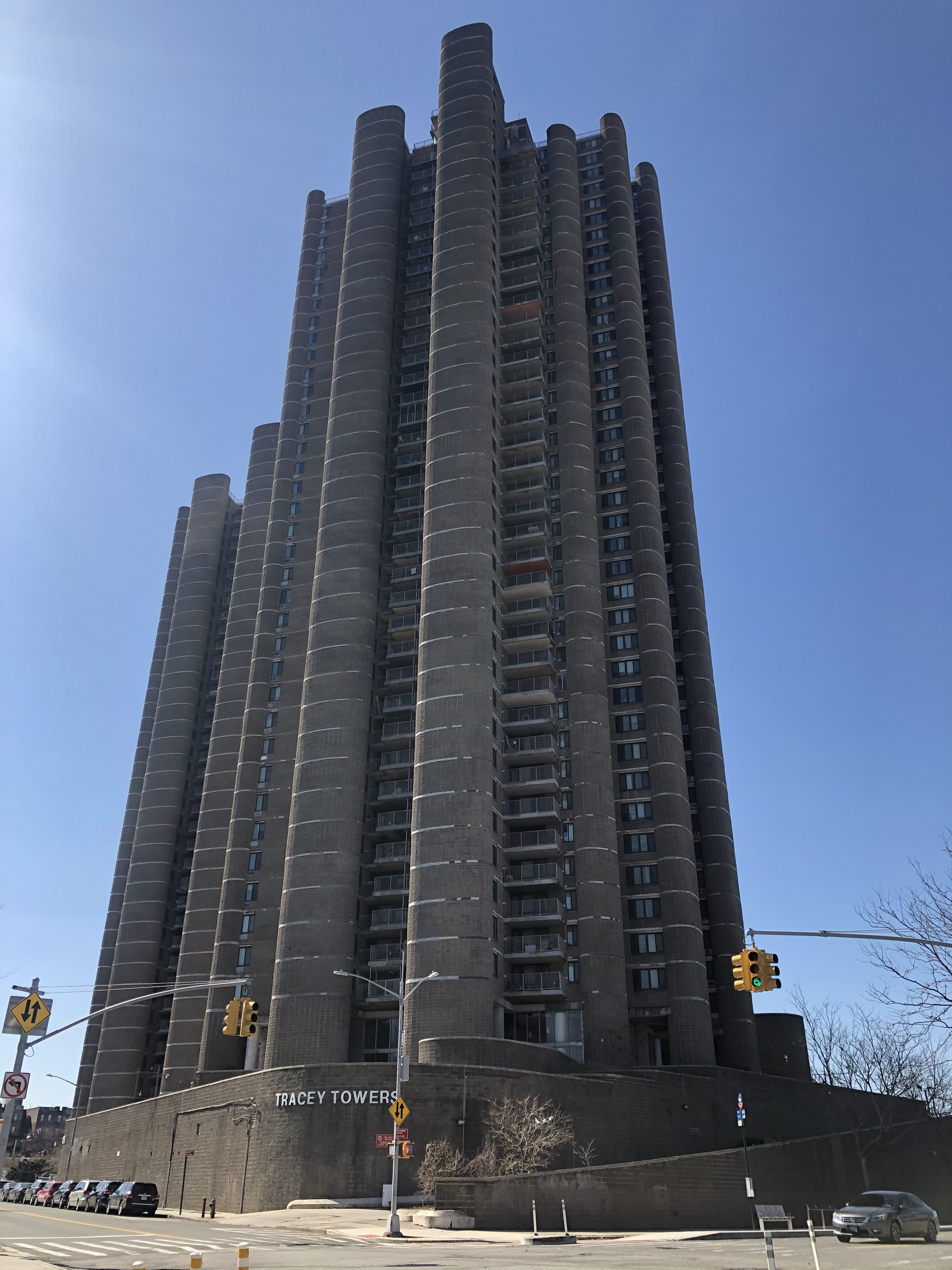
- Interactive map of the Tracey Towers area

General information
- Status: Completed
- Type: residential Co-op
- Architectural style: Brutalist
- Location: Jerome Yard, Jerome Park, 20 West Mosholu Parkway (East Tower); 40 West Mosholu Parkway (West Tower), The Bronx, New York City, US
- Coordinates: East Tower 40°52′45″N 73°53′10″W, West Tower 40°52′48″N 73°53′11″W
- Completed: 1972
- Opened: 1974

Technical details
- Material: concrete

Design and construction
- Architect: Paul Rudolph

Other information
- Number of suites: 871

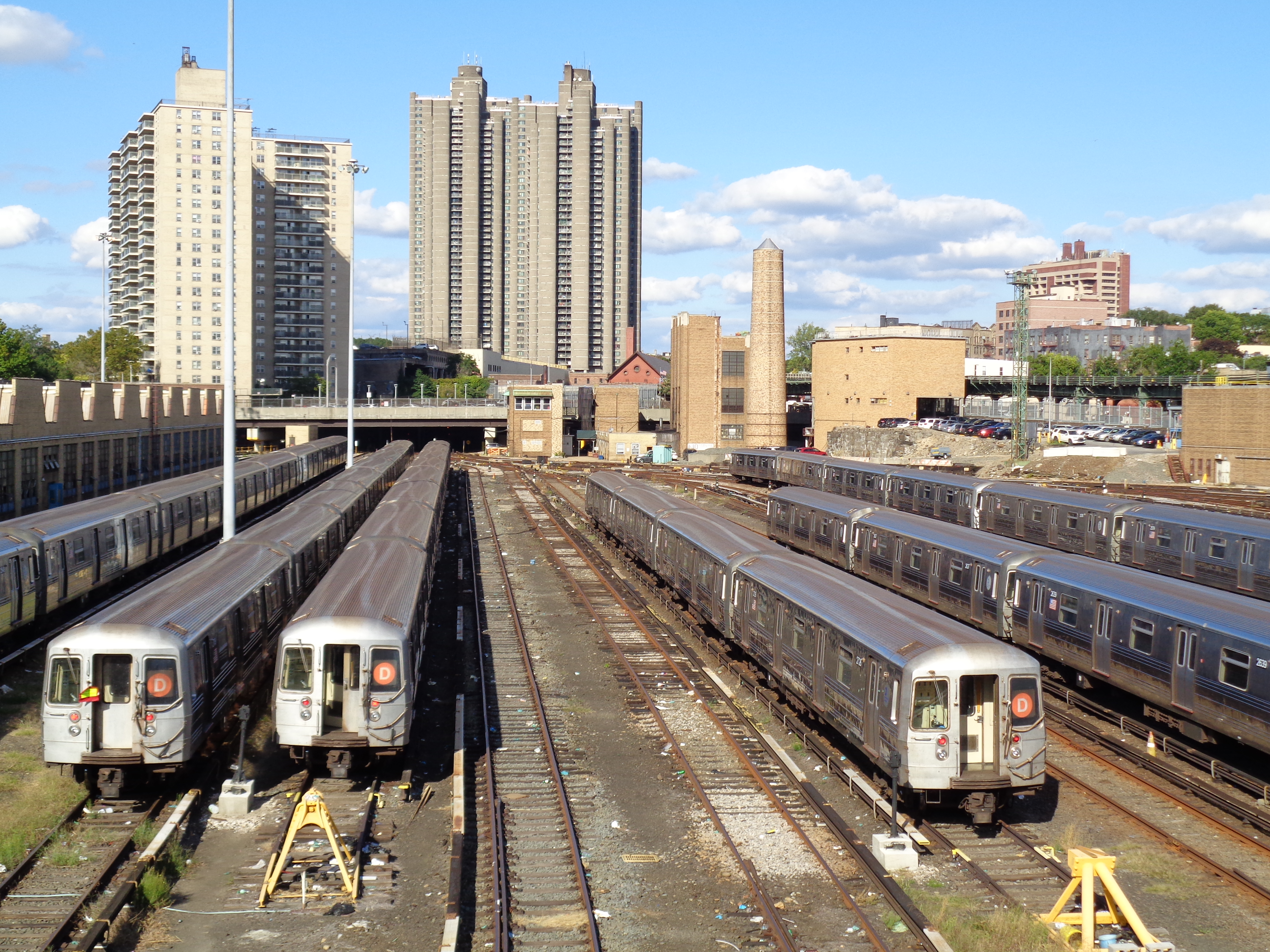
Tracey Towers seen from Bedford Park Blvd, next to 3400 Paul Avenue. The Concourse Yard is in the foreground, storing New York City Subway trains.

Tracey Towers are twin buildings designed by architect Paul Rudolph, located in the Jerome Park neighborhood of the Bronx, New York City. They are a predominant feature of the Bronx's mainly flat skyline.

== History ==
The buildings were created as a result of the Mitchell-Lama program, in addition, air rights of neighboring properties, including those of the Metropolitan Transportation Authority's Jerome Yard, were purchased to allow for construction. Intended to be a luxury condominium, the buildings were completed in 1972 and opened in 1974 as subsidized housing. Combined, they have 871 units of various sizes, including one-bedroom and two-bedroom apartments. The towers became the tallest in the borough when completed, at 400 feet (120 m), although the 404 feet tall River Park Towers took the title just three years later. They were and remain the second-tallest cooperative housing development in the Bronx, behind Co-Op City, which is the largest of its kind in the world. Amenities, however, have been on a slow decline in quality. In particular, tenants complain about the inconsistencies of the towers' boilers, and hot water is frequently shut without prior notice.

== Architecture ==
Tracey Towers consists of nine windowless concrete tubes built with grooved blocks and without any setbacks. These blocks create asterisks which are divided by white slabs relative to each floor. Unlike most buildings in the city, the windows and balconies are placed in between the gaps formed by the concrete tubes. These tubes are also designed to spiral around a central keystone-like structure on a square-shaped plot. This design was chosen in order to align with Rudolph's vision for a futuristic obelisk. This architectural style which the towers employ is known as brutalism, with some postmodern elements added. The plot of land which it sits on is mostly resembles a trapezoid and takes up the majority of the land on the block. The inside is similarly as complex; tenants and visitors alike are confused at the various openings and exits. Although they may appear identical at first, one is taller and has three more floors than its shorter counterpart. The complex sits on the Jerome Yard, which forces the heights of the buildings to differ by a significant margin.

=== Parking lot ===
The parking lot of Tracey Towers maintains the same design as the towers proper. About a story tall, an ear-shaped route which ramps downward toward the intersection at Mosholu Parkway and Paul Avenue is necessary for vehicles. Cars loop around on a curved, slightly elevated route to enter the lot which starts on the intersection with Mosholu Parkway and Jerome Avenue. The entire route is one-way only, and it goes under the East Tower at one point. The route is mostly separate from the parking lot except for where cars exit/enter it. A blue basketball court is present on the building.

==== Metropolitan Transportation Authority ====
The Jerome Yard is located under the parking lot, which stores the rolling stock of the New York City Subway's 4 train. A yellow, blocky maintenance building cuts through some of the parking lot space. A stub of the IRT Jerome Avenue Line diverges from the main line heading west, sloping down until the tracks travel under the parking lot. Another, human-accessible entrance exists at Paul Avenue below the exit ramp mentioned below. It also handles vehicles.

==== Deterioration ====
Like the rest of the complex, the parking lot has been tampered with by both natural and man-made sources. This includes graffiti and vines stretching through all of the parking lot's walls.

== Gallery ==
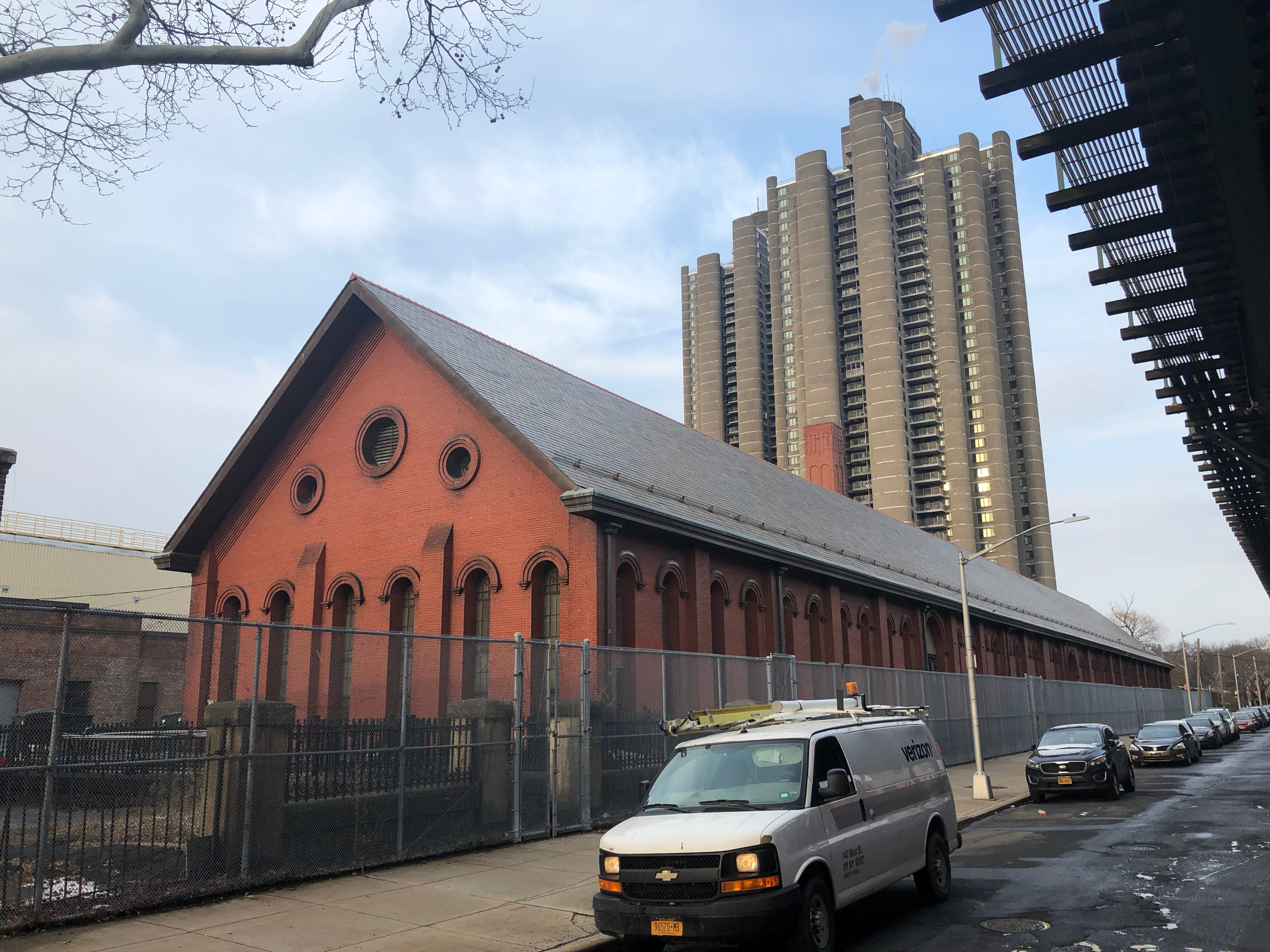
Tracey Towers from Jerome Avenue, with the red-bricked High Pumping Station in the foreground.

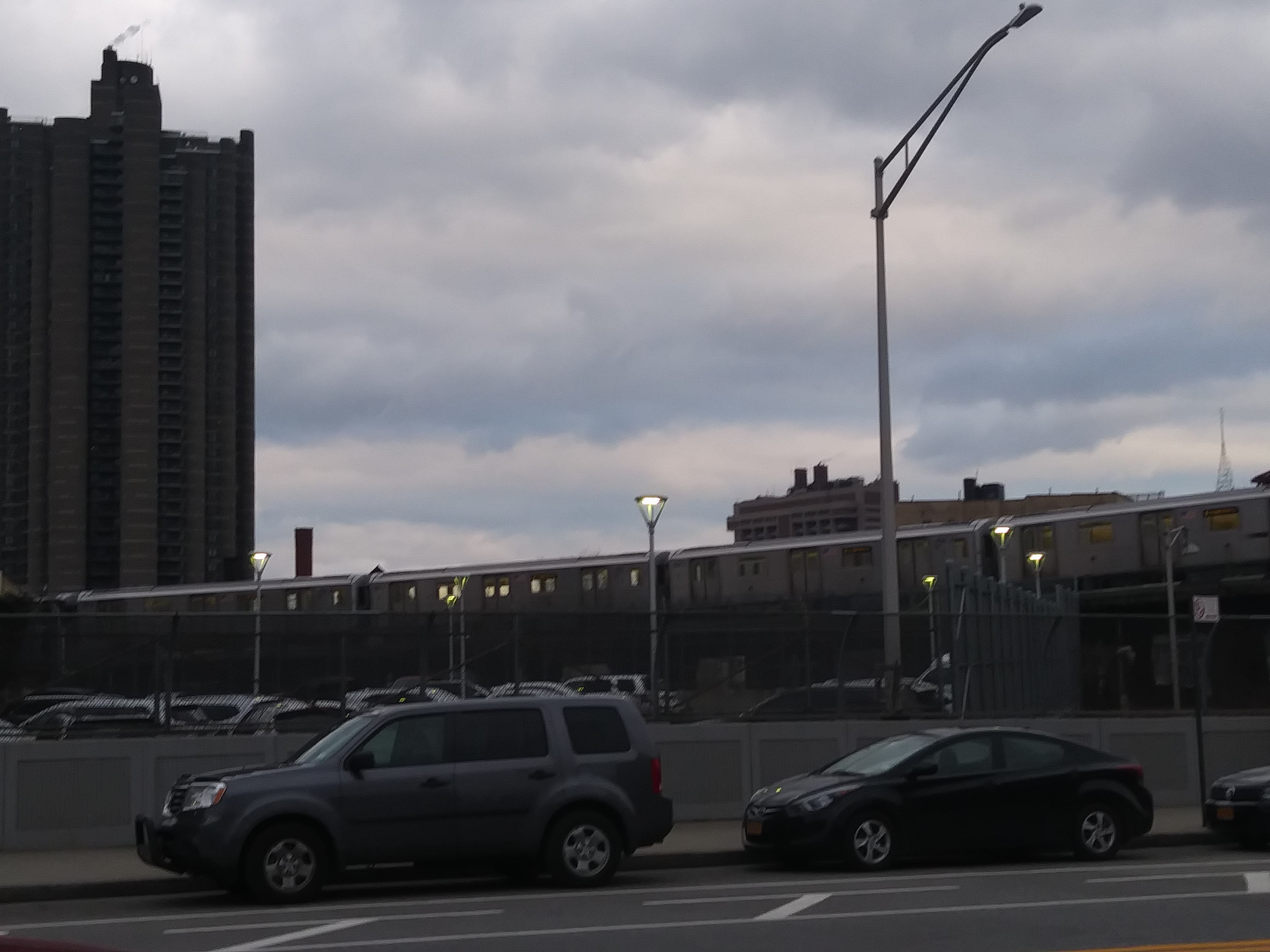
Tracey Towers with the train coming out of the parking lot, which houses Jerome Avenue.

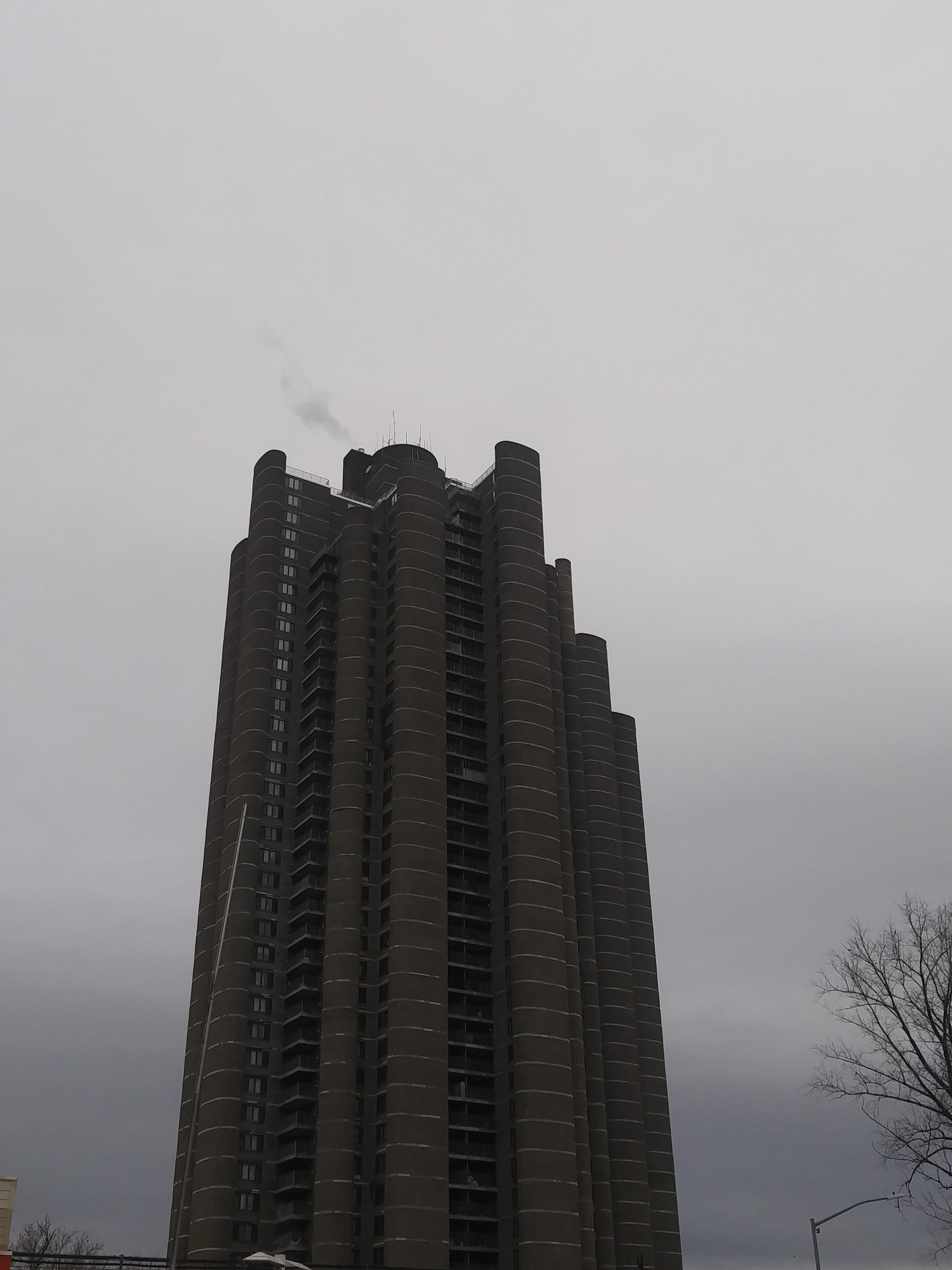
East Tower can be seen releasing smoke.

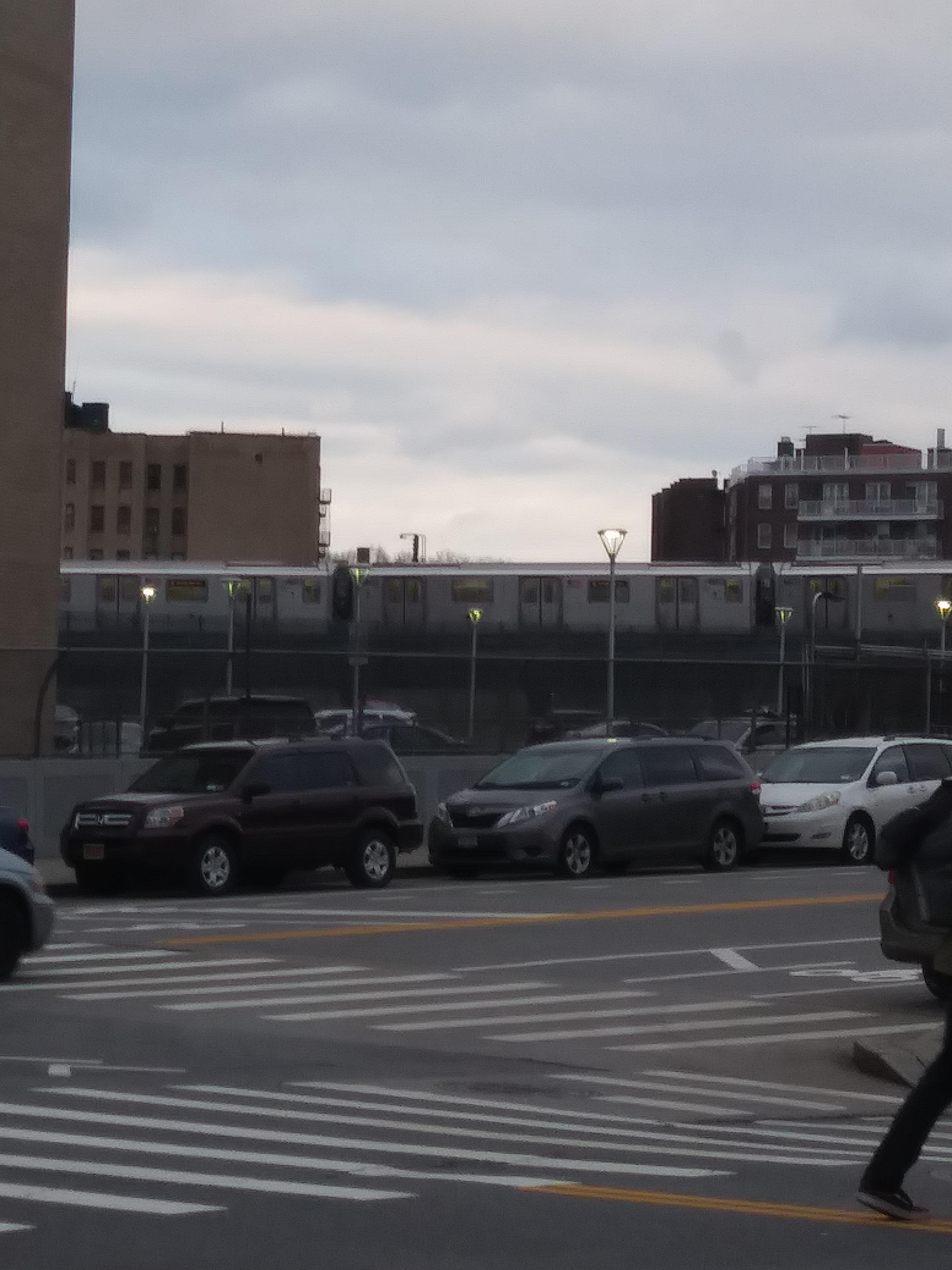
Jerome Yard with train coming out of it

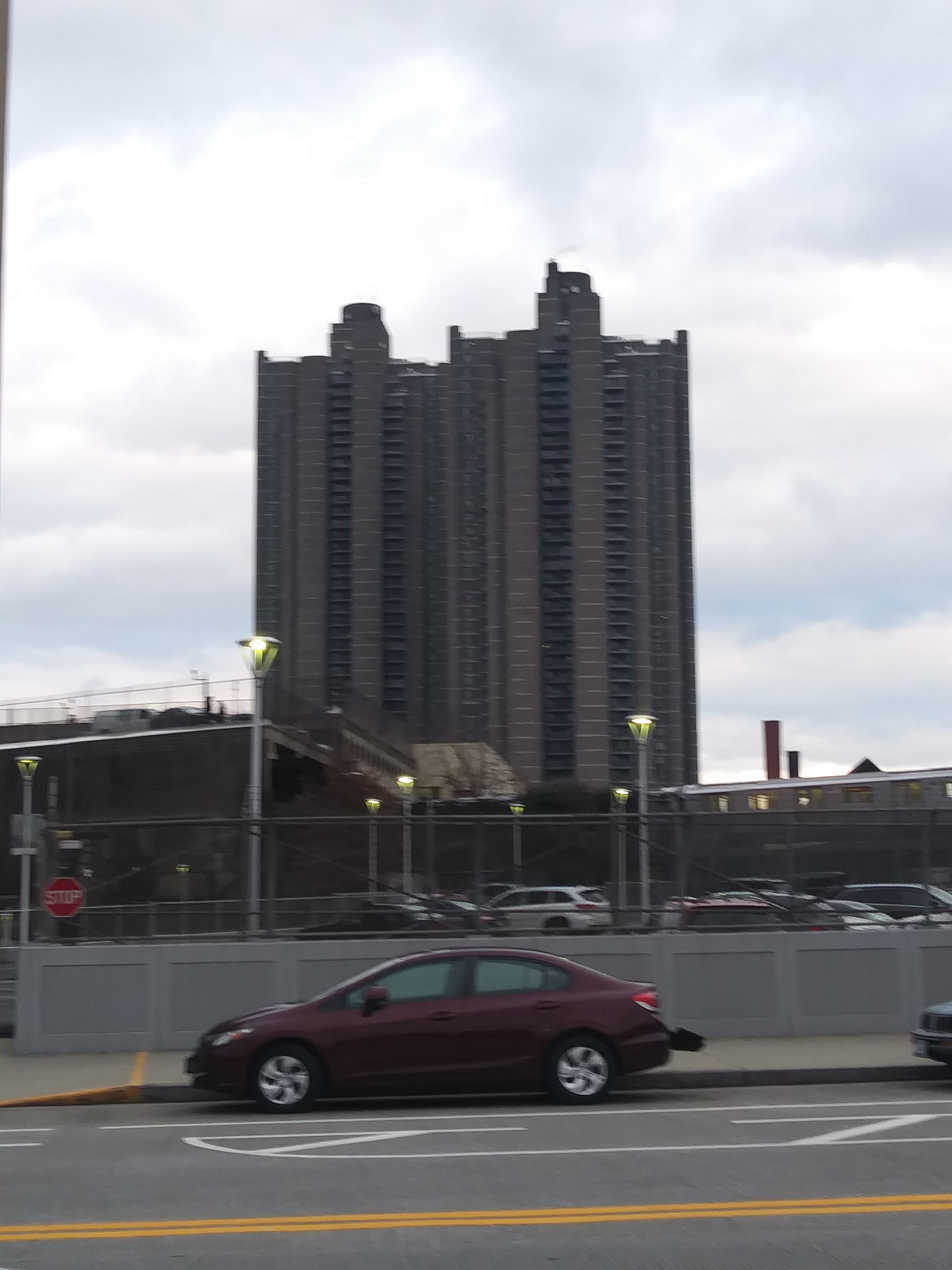
Tracey Towers from West 205th Street. Entrance to Jerome Yard is visible.

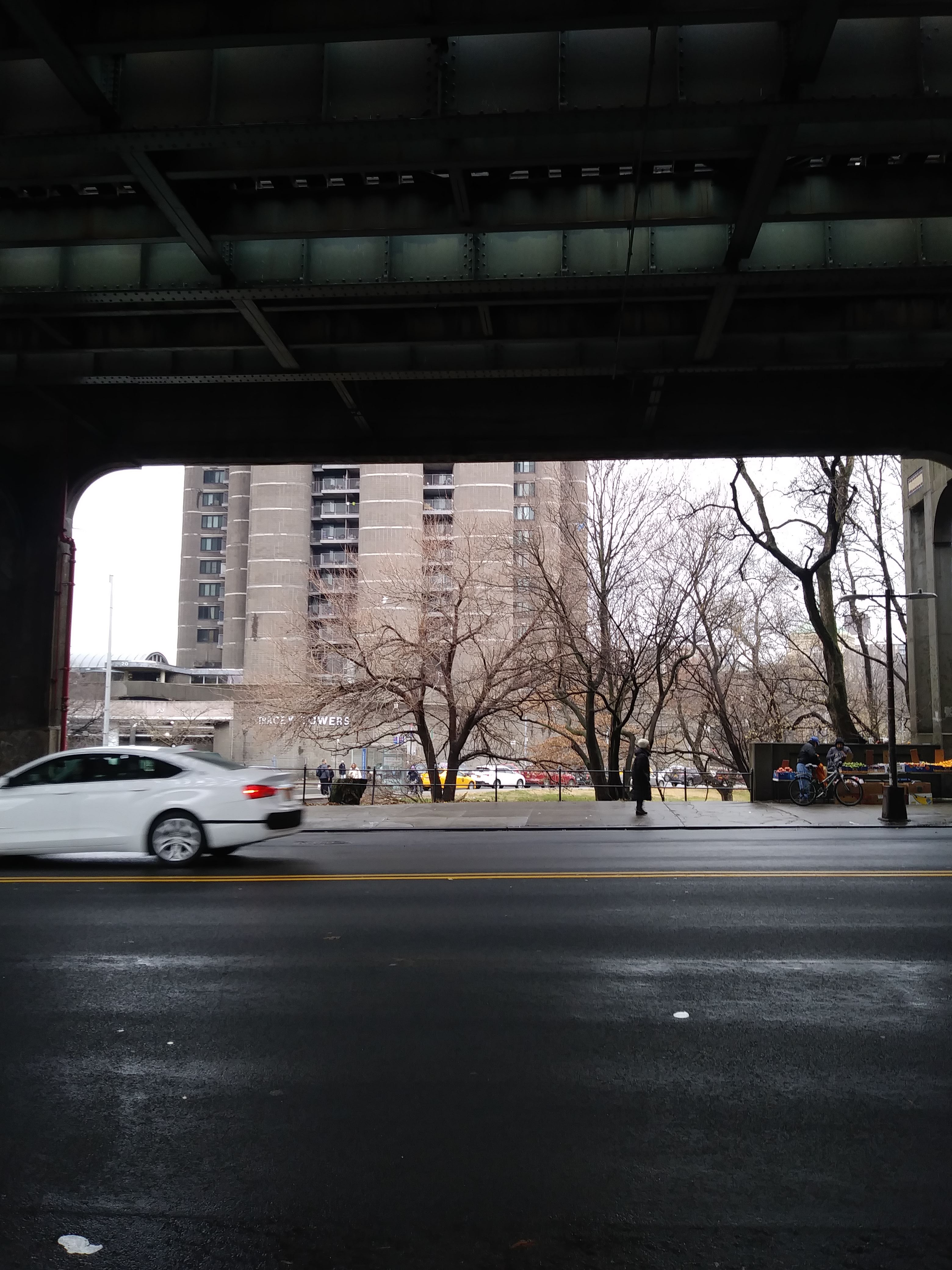
View of Tracey Towers from Mosholu Parkway.

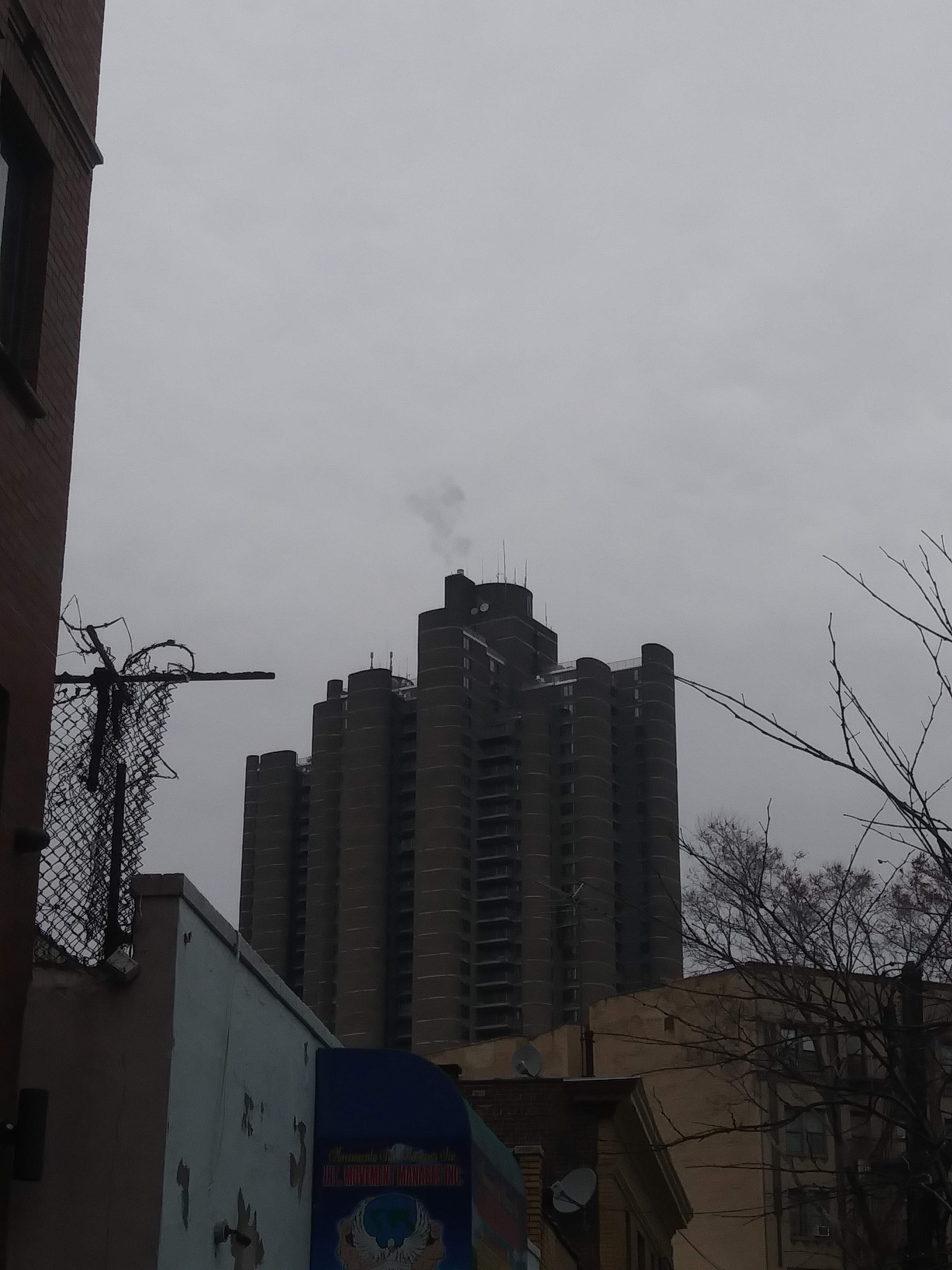
Both Towers are tall enough that they extend past the Victorian-Era Apartment buildings in the area. Taken from Villa Avenue.

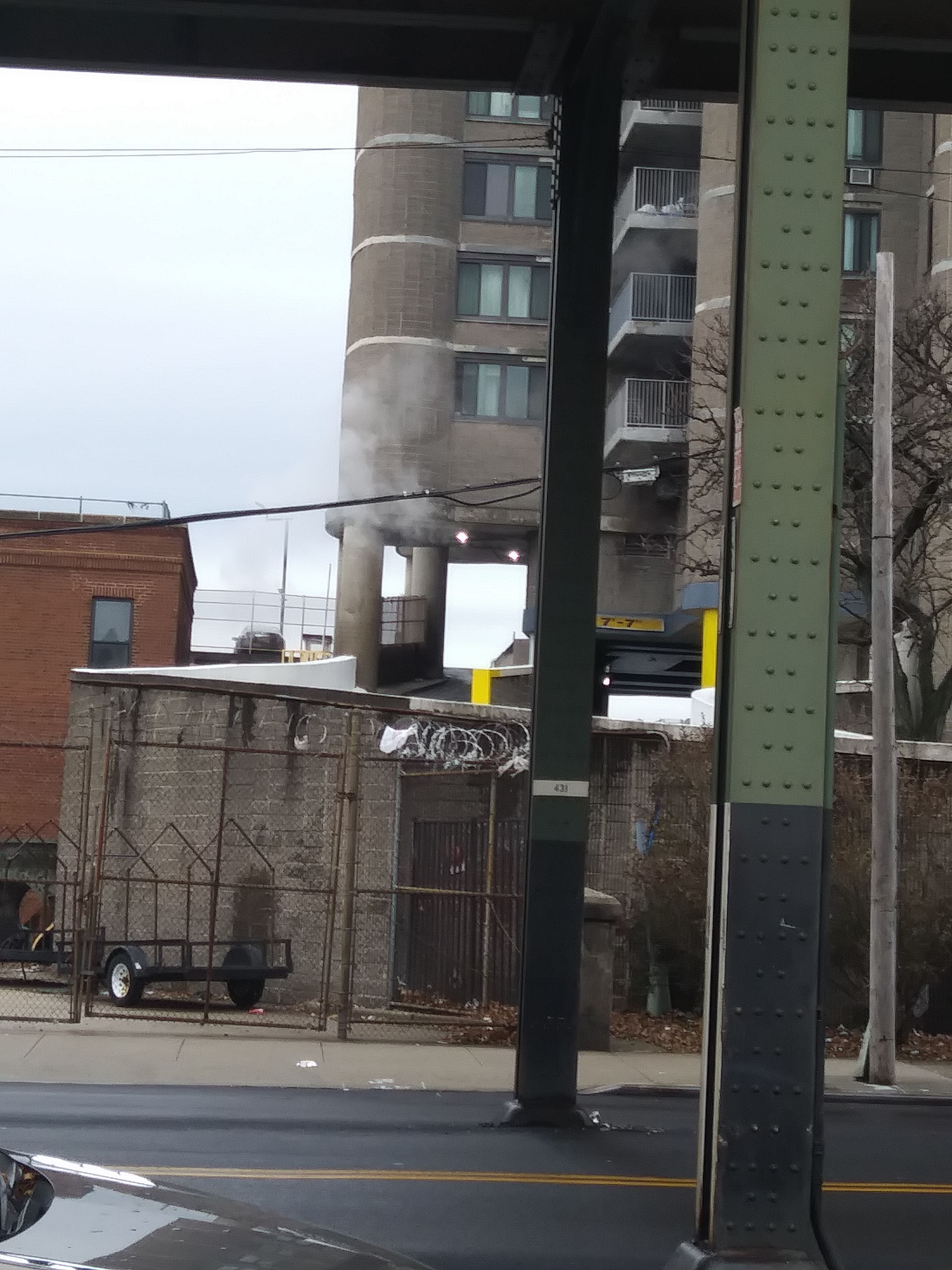
Entrance to the parking lot.

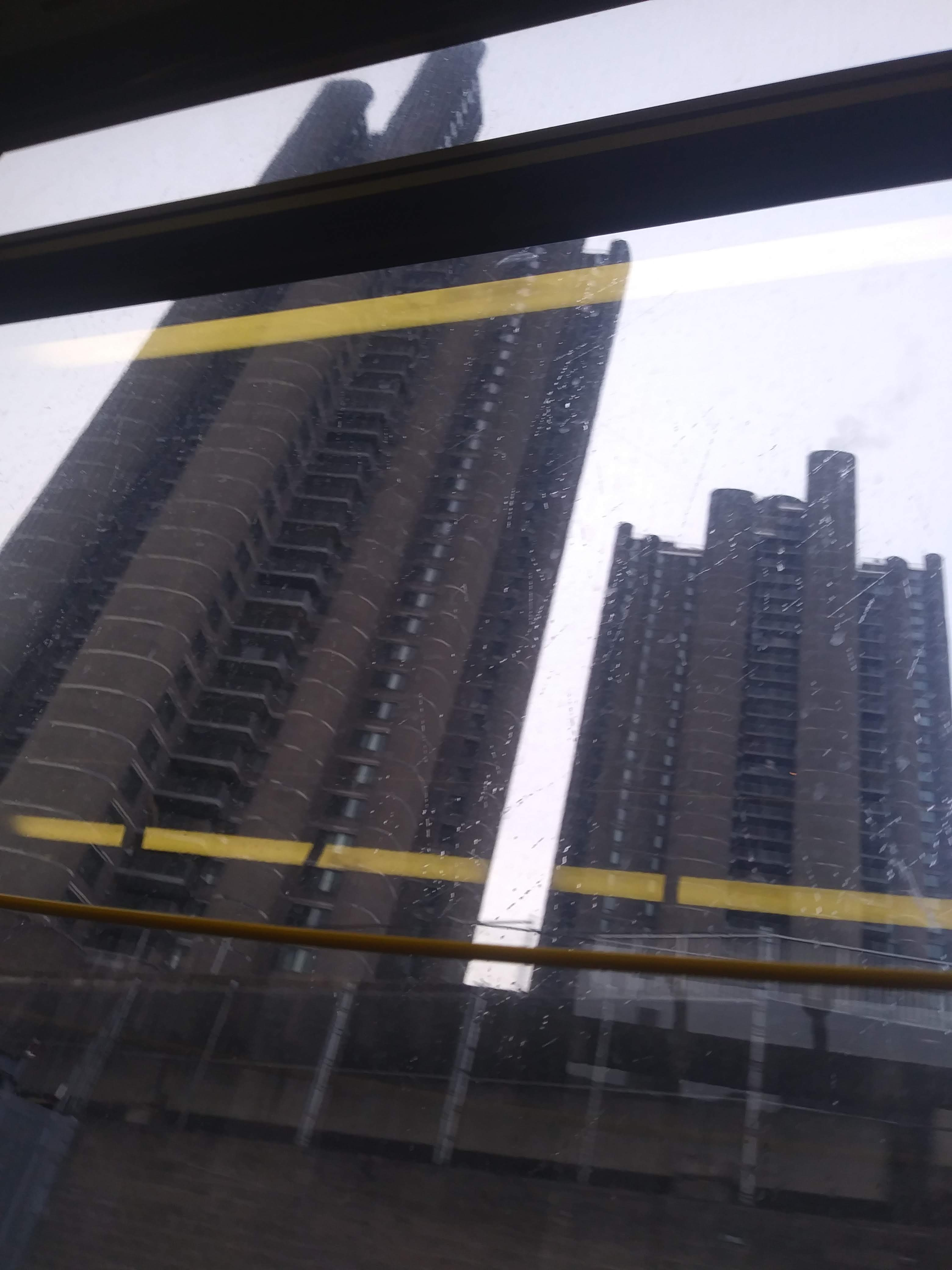
Tracey Towers from the local bus.

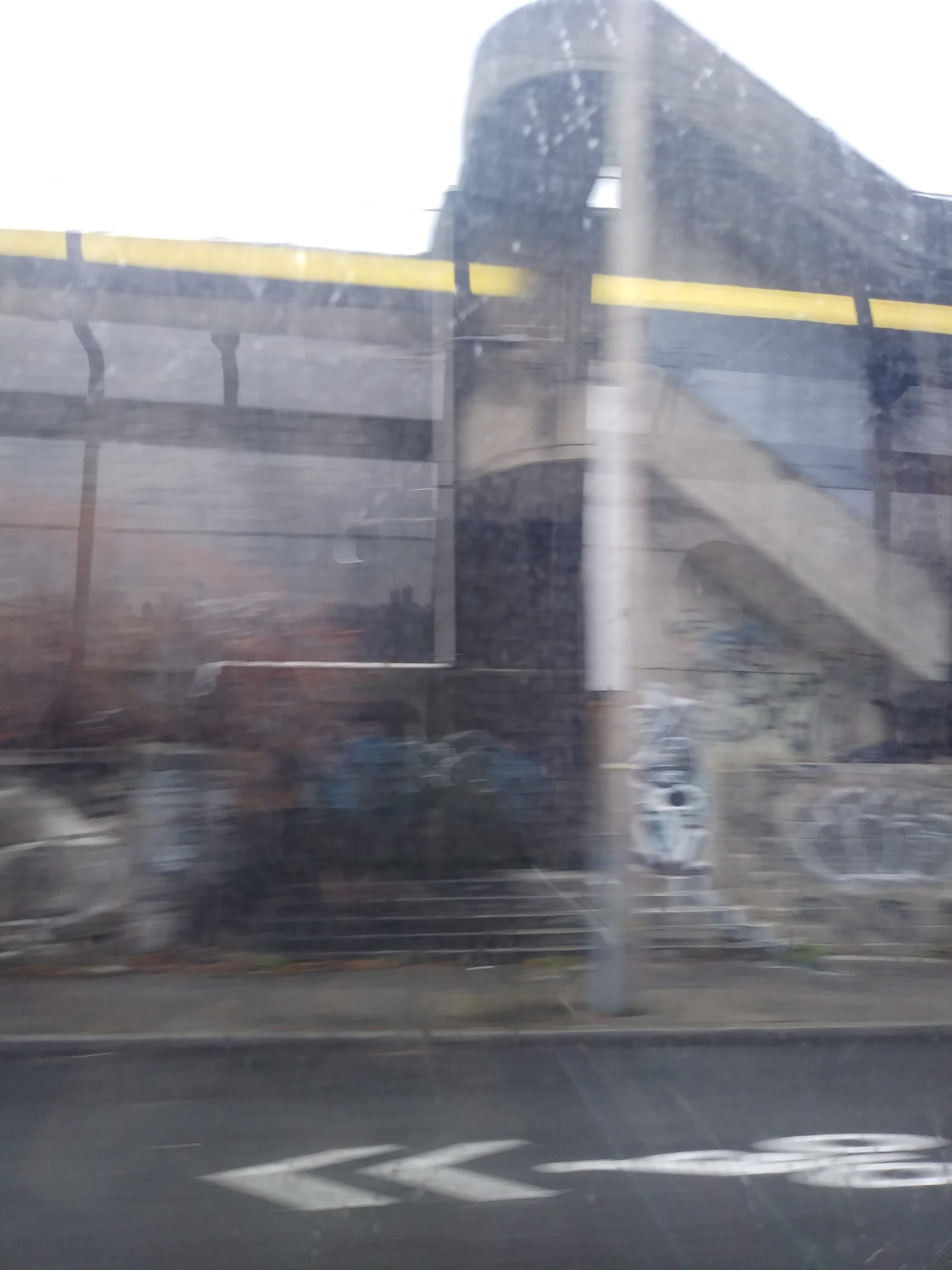
An abandoned staircase leading up to the parking lot shows the complex's decay.

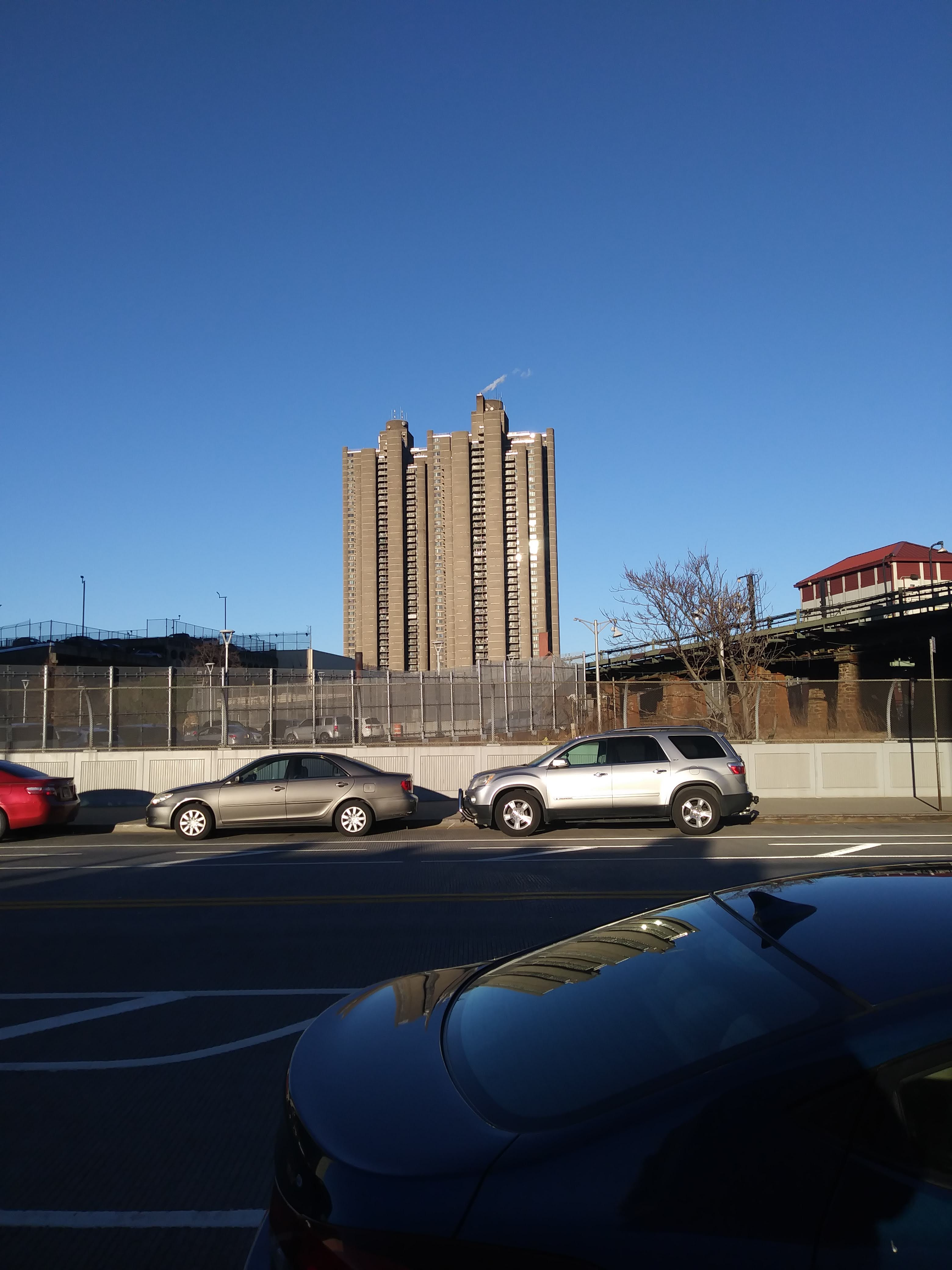
Tracey Towers on a bright day.

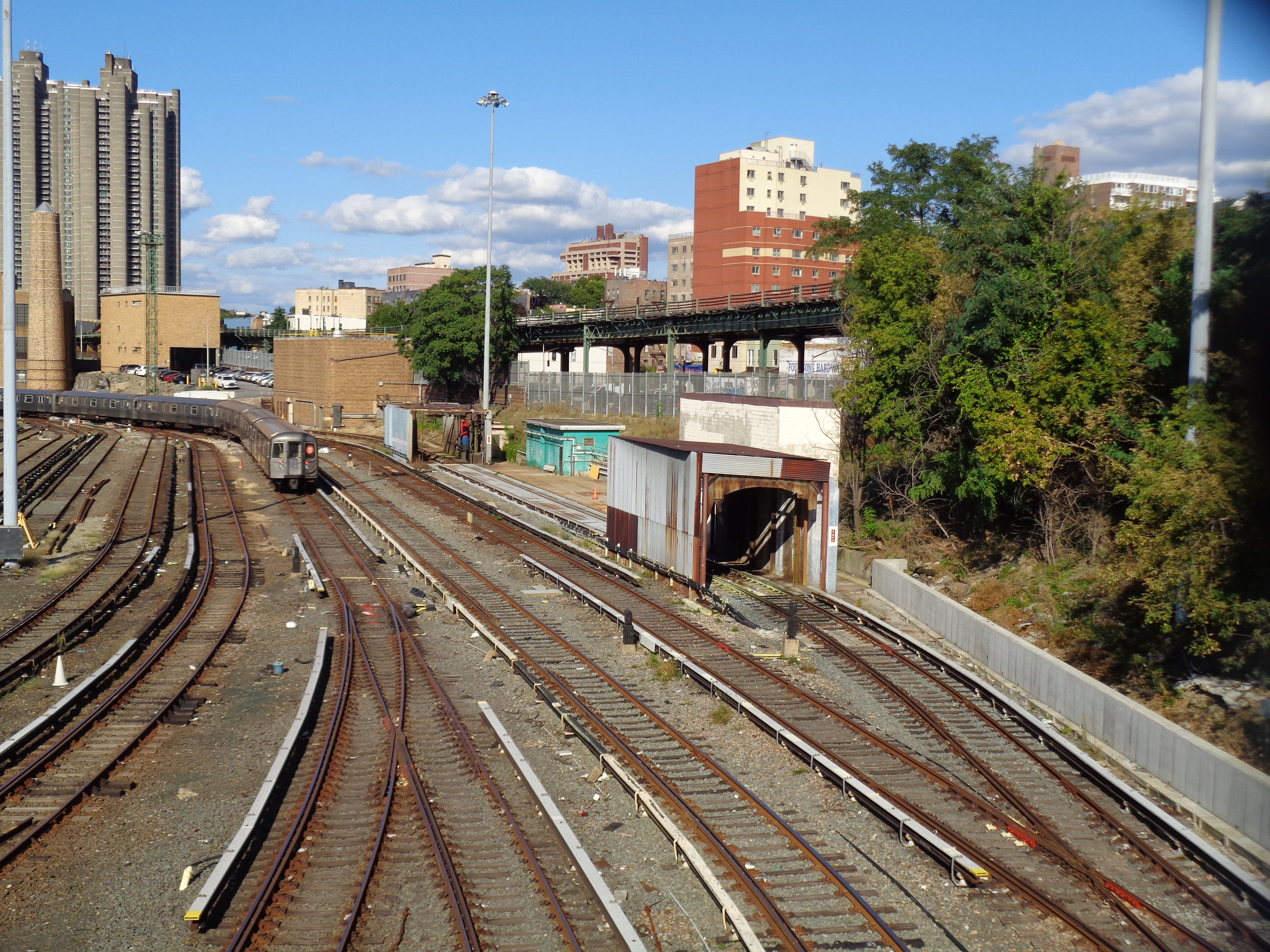
Concourse Yard revealing a tunnel where D and B trains enter the yard. Tracey Towers is in the background.

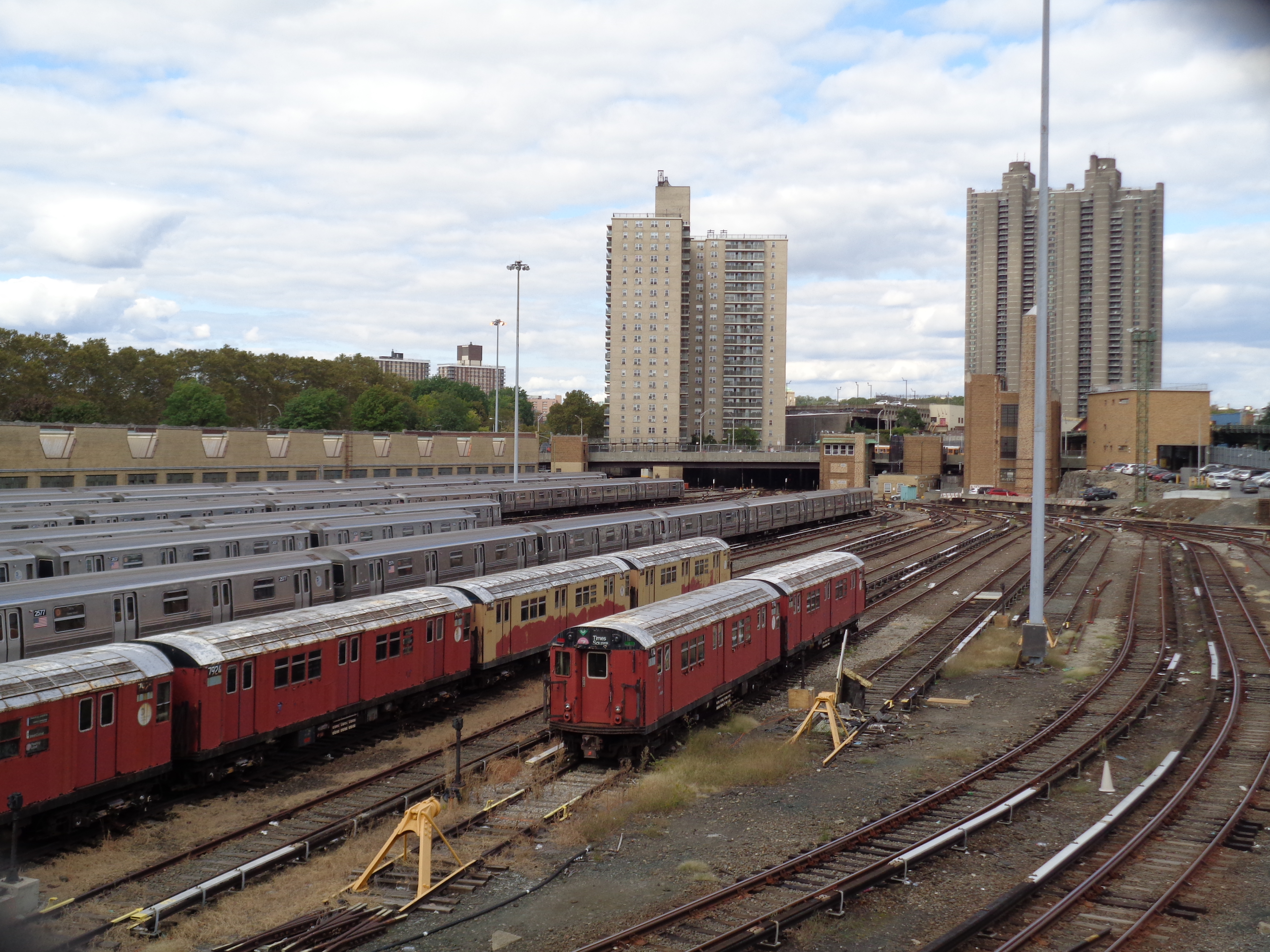
Scott Towers (20 stories) and Tracey Towers (38 & 41 stories)

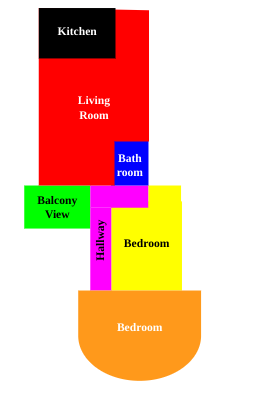
Two-Bedroom apartment of Tracey Towers

== Coordinates ==
- East Tower 40°52′45″N 73°53′10″W, at 20 W Mosholu Parkway
- West Tower 40°52′48″N 73°53′11″W, at 40 W Mosholu Parkway
