= East River Greenway =

Esplanade in Manhattan, New York

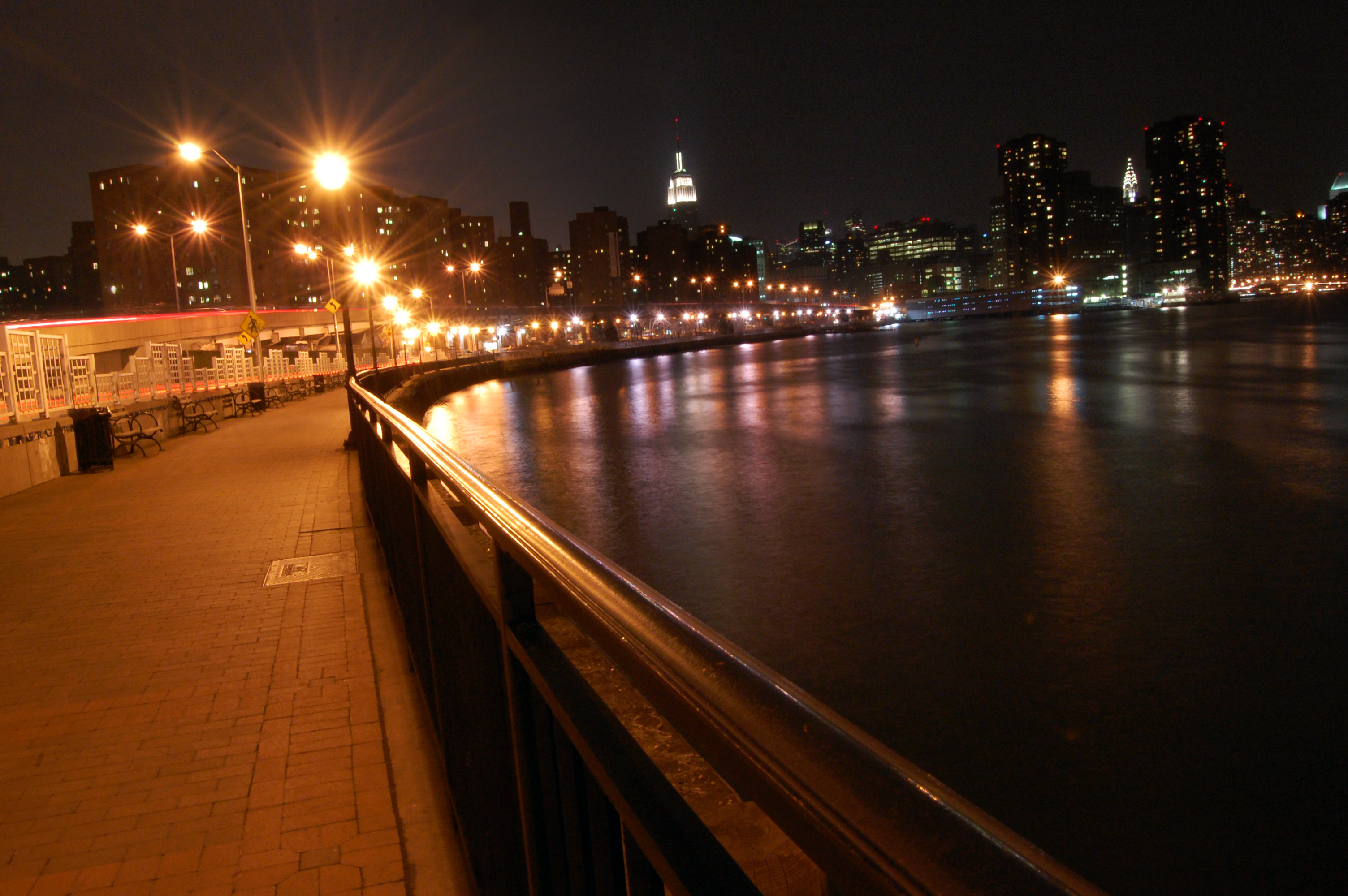
The narrow portion of the Greenway, at 18th Street in 2009

The East River Greenway (also called the East River Esplanade) is an approximately 9.44-mile-long (15.19 km) foreshoreway for walking or cycling on the east side of the island of Manhattan on the East River. It is part of the Manhattan Waterfront Greenway. The largest portions are operated by the New York City Department of Parks and Recreation. It is separated from motor traffic, and many sections also separate pedestrians from cyclists. The greenway is parallel to the Franklin D. Roosevelt East River Drive for a majority of its length.

Parts of the greenway were built at different times. Most of the greenway was built from the 1930s to 1950s in conjunction with the nearby FDR Drive, with exceptions:

- Waterside Plaza: 1973
- East River Esplanade Park: 1992
- East River Waterfront: Late 1990s
- Stuyvesant Cove: 2002
- United Nations portion (under construction): 2015–28

== Route ==
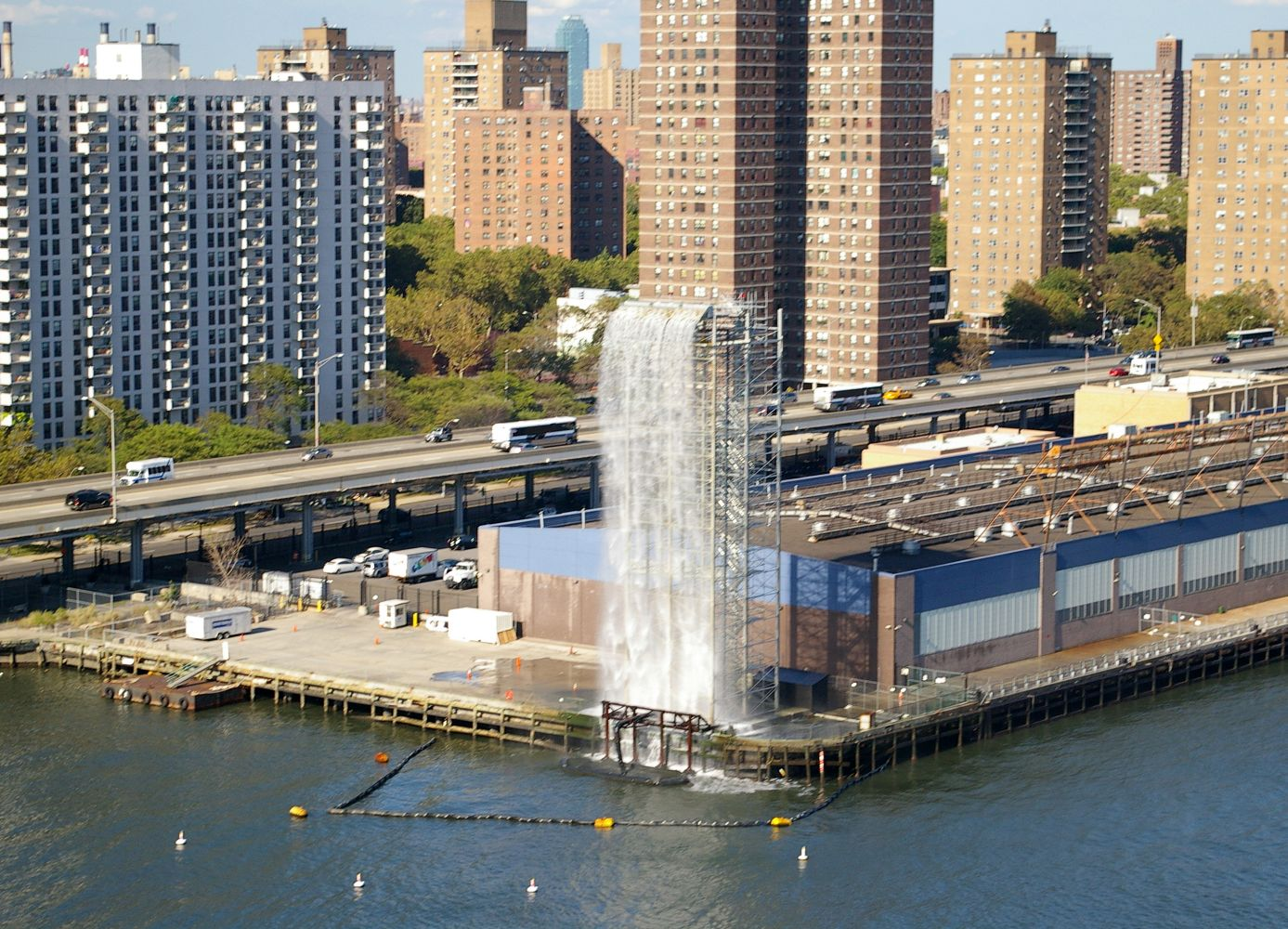
New York City Waterfalls along the East River Greenway at Pier 35

The greenway runs along the East Side, from Battery Park and past South Street Seaport to a dead end at 125th Street, East Harlem with a 0.6-mile (0.97 km) gap from 41st to 53rd streets in Midtown where pedestrians use busy First and Second Avenues to get around United Nations Headquarters between the Turtle Bay and Kips Bay portions of the Greenway.

Some places are narrow due to sinkholes being blocked off by protective fencing, and one part squeezes between the highway and the dock of Con Edison's East River Generating Station, requiring slower speeds. Other parts are shared space with motor access to Waterside Plaza or a filling station. Approximately one mile (1.6 km) near the southeast end is in the shadow of the elevated FDR Drive. This part is to be improved by the East River Esplanade project. In February 2019, The New York City Department of Parks and Recreation allocated $75 million to complete the esplanade within East Harlem, East Midtown, and the Lower East Side.

In the summer of 2008 the East River Greenway, along with the Brooklyn Heights Promenade, provided viewing locations to see the New York City Waterfalls.

== Components ==
=== East Harlem ===
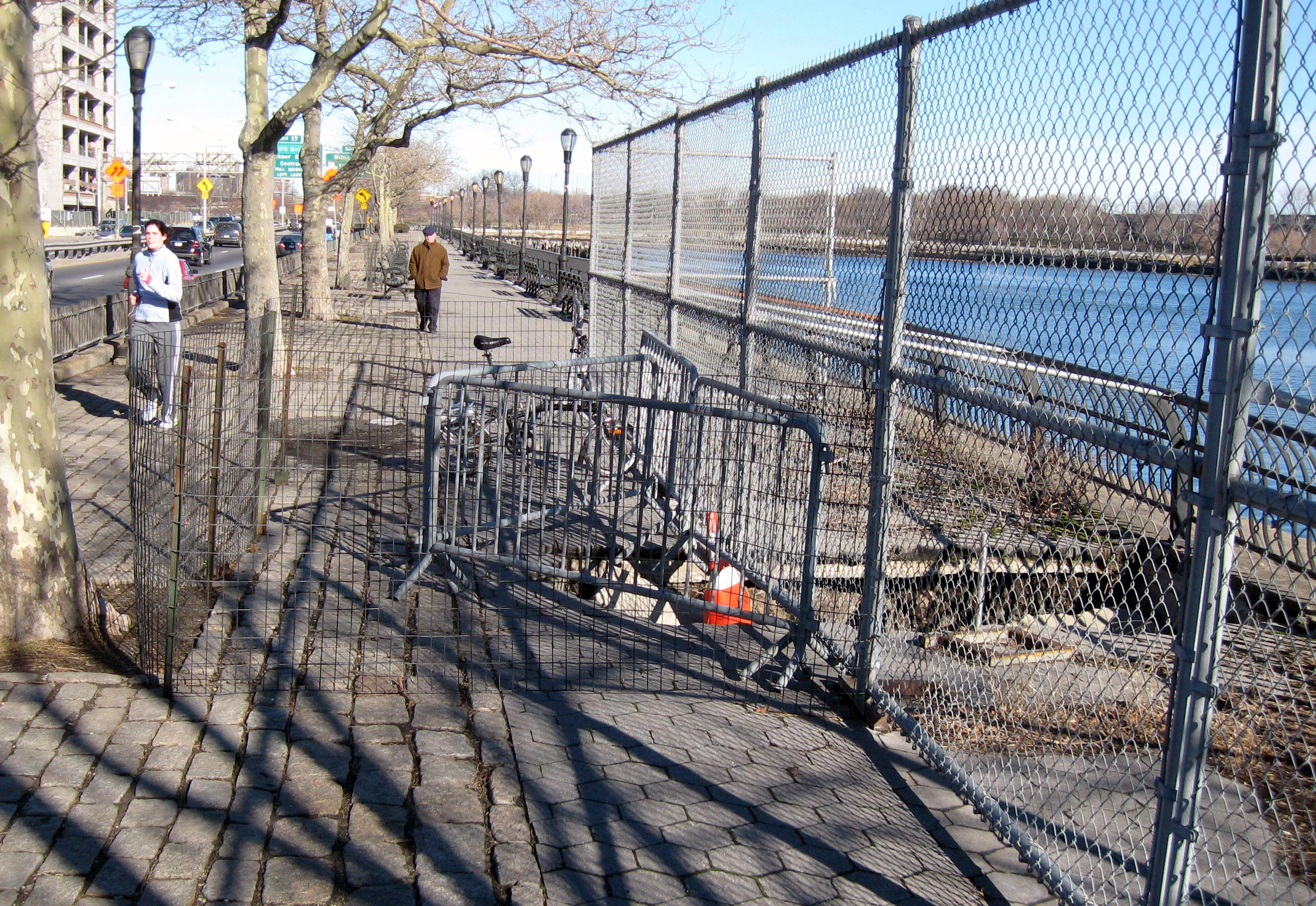
Section in East Harlem with a sinkhole

The East Harlem section runs from the Triborough Bridge ramp at 124th Street to the Gracie Mansion site at 90th Street. It contains four footbridges across the FDR Drive as well as a footbridge, the Wards Island Bridge, to Randalls and Wards Islands at 103rd Street. A connection to the Harlem River Greenway at 132nd Street is expected to be built between 2021 and 2024.

Although the park is in East Harlem, where all residents have access to a pocket park, neighborhood park, or major park within one-quarter mile (0.4 km), amenities are limited in this section of the greenway. This decrepit portion of the East River Greenway has little open space and no recreation facilities. The New York City Department of Parks and Recreation allocated $25 million to stabilize the greenway between 114th and 117th Streets in 2019; at the time, the section between 107th and 114th Streets was closed off. The work was expected to take one year, but little progress was made during this period. The city allocated $284 million for repairs to the greenway, including the East Harlem section, in early 2021. Plans for the redesigned segments of the greenway from 94th to 107th Streets and 117th to 124th Streets as well as a replacement for the pier at 107th Street were announced in April 2024, with construction expected to occur from 2025 through 2027. Reconstruction of the greenway segment between 114th and 117th Streets was expected to begin in the summer of 2024; work did not begin until October 2025.

=== Upper East Side ===
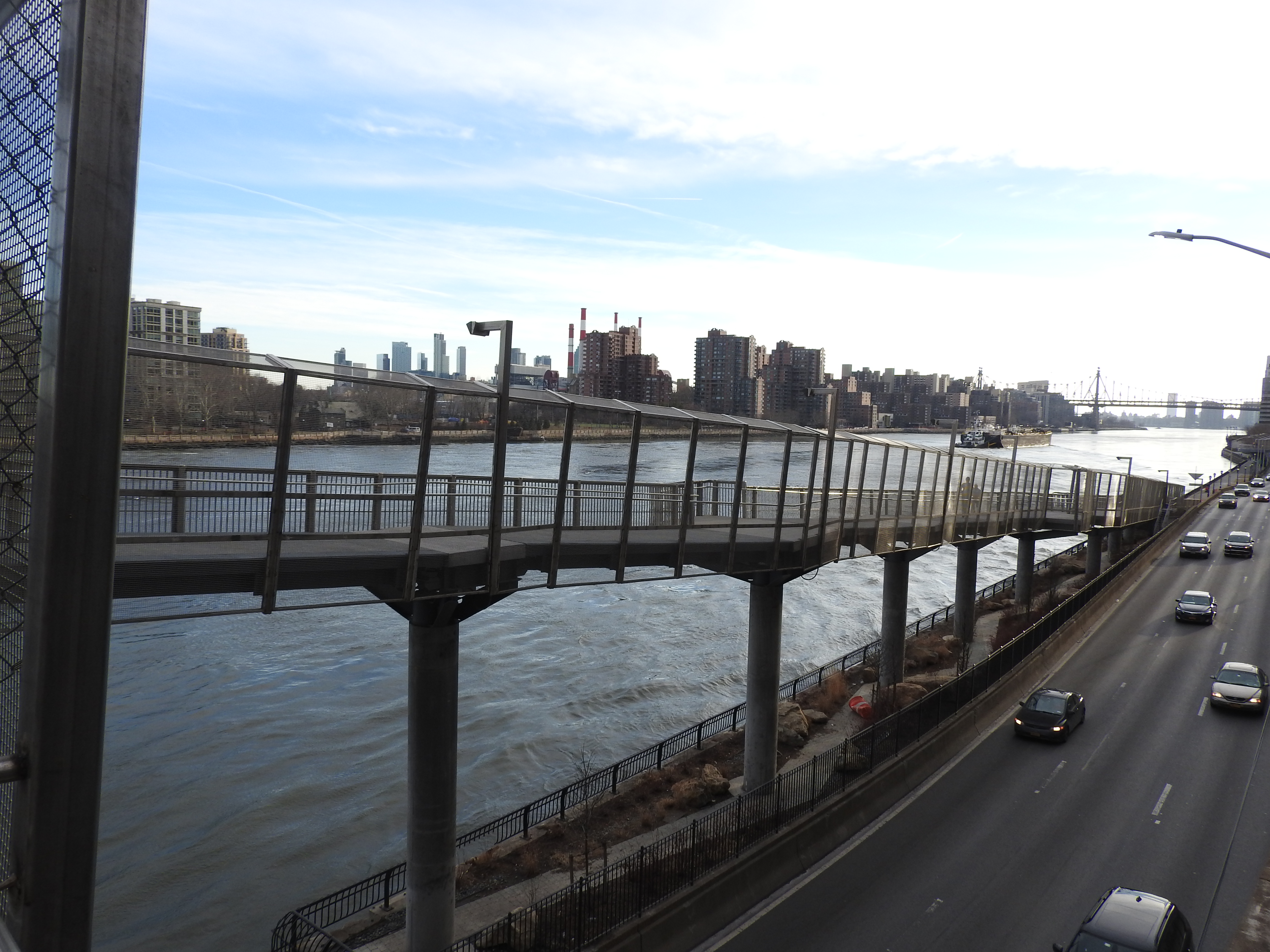
81st Street ramp replaced stairway in 2017

At 90th Street the Greenway rises to a walkway above the double-decker FDR Drive. The East River Greenway then passes along Carl Schurz Park near Gracie Mansion, and overlooks the waters of Hell Gate and Wards Island in the East River. The Greenway is also the park's waterfront promenade, a deck built over the FDR Drive. The park is bordered on the west by East End Avenue and on the south by Gracie Square, the extension of East 84th Street to the river.

A set of wrought iron gates sit at the intersection of the Greenway at Gracie Square and another at East 83rd Street. These gates represent a curious agreement between the New York City Department of Parks and Recreation and the board of directors of 10 Gracie Square. Completing construction of the John Finley Walk in 1939 required traversing the private property of 10 Gracie Square. In exchange for providing access to the City, the wrought iron gates were installed, and 10 Gracie Square was given the right to ceremoniously close the gates for a short period of time, demonstrating the building's ownership of the one block length of the Greenway.

The greenway descends to a grade-level promenade via a 452-foot-long (138 m), 9-foot-wide (2.7 m) ramp at 81st Street. The ramp opened in late 2017, replacing a staircase. The greenway continues to the Queensboro Bridge, with footbridges at 78th, 71st, and 63rd Streets.

The part of the greenway nearest the Queensboro Bridge was the topic of local plans released by Community Board 8 in 2002, and again in 2006. Proposals included reusing a former waste transfer station of the New York City Department of Sanitation at 60th Street, renovating existing parks nearby (including the Andrew Haswell Green Park between 60th and 62nd Streets), and using a disused vehicular ramp to connect the greenway to York Avenue at 60th Street. This renovation was funded by a development project at 73rd Street by the City University of New York and Memorial Sloan-Kettering Cancer Center. Further, $23 million from The New York City Department of Parks and Recreation and $15 million from Rockefeller University were allocated to complete renovations to the section of the greenway between 62nd and 63rd Streets, which started in 2015.

=== United Nations ===
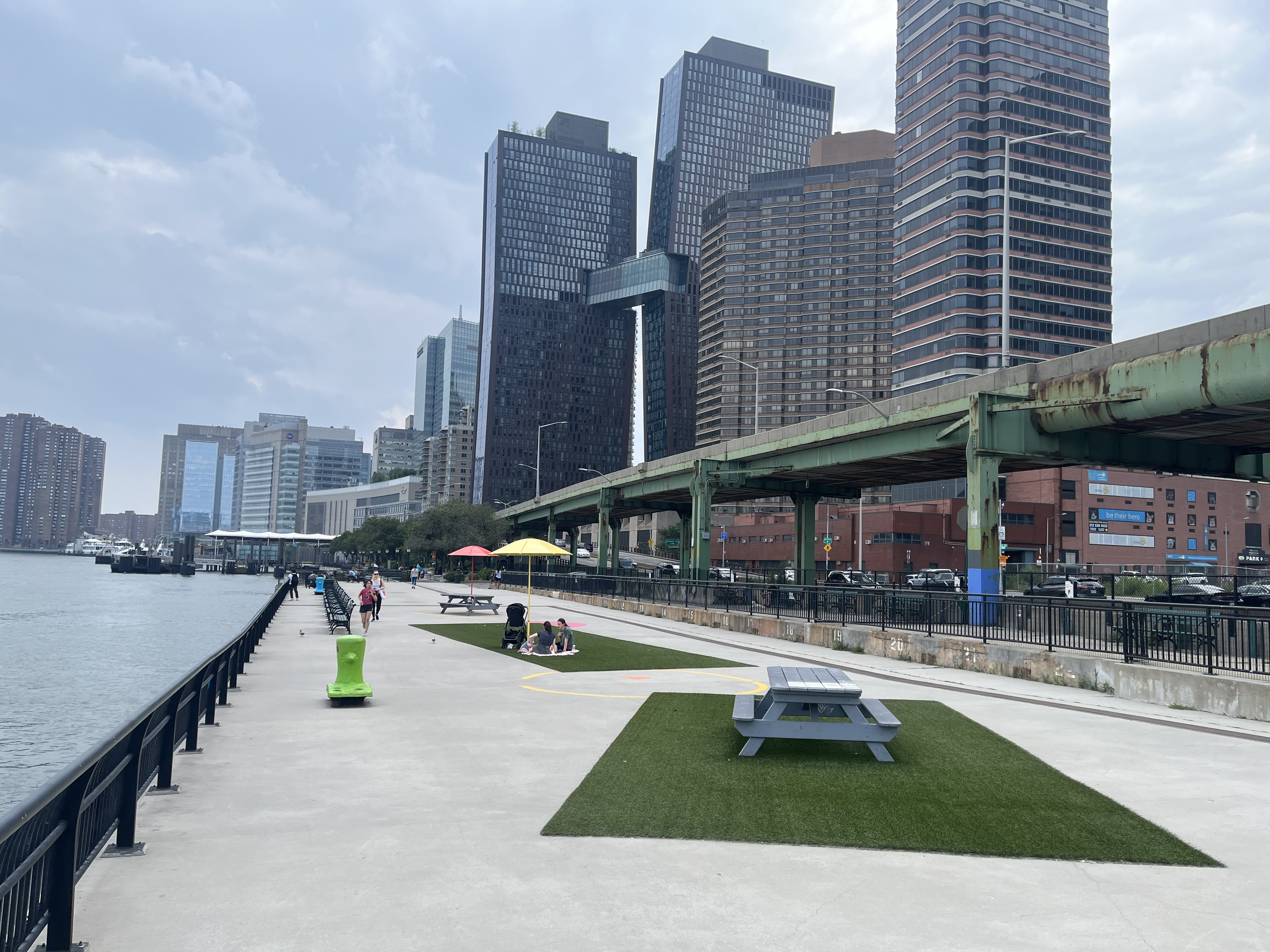
New Wave Pier in July 2023

South of 53rd Street, to 41st Street, the greenway enters its only undeveloped section, save for a small section accessed by a footbridge at 51st Street.

Previously, the greenway was undeveloped between 60th Street and 38th Street. In October 2011, the city and state reached an agreement to use the western portion of Robert Moses Playground at 41st Street for an expansion of the United Nations Headquarters campus. In exchange, the United Nations Development Corporation (UNDC) would pay $73 million to fund the development of the gap in the Greenway between 38th and 60th streets. Designs for this stretch of the greenway were revealed in November 2013.

The new design, which incorporates an amphitheater and a floating pier, was proposed to open in three phases. The first was to open in 2015 and the last by 2024. The three parts are between 38th, 41st, 53rd, and 60th Streets, with three gathering nodes along the way.

The greenway section between 38th and 41st Streets, referred to as Waterside Pier, was completed in October 2016 and replaced a structure last used by Con Edison for vehicle storage and fuel deliveries at its former Waterside power plant. In October 2021, Waterside Pier was temporarily renamed as "New Wave Pier" and turf areas and picnic tables were added to provide supplemental recreation space during construction of the city's East Side Coastal Resiliency project. In April 2017, the city committed $100 million in funding toward building the other two parts of the greenway.

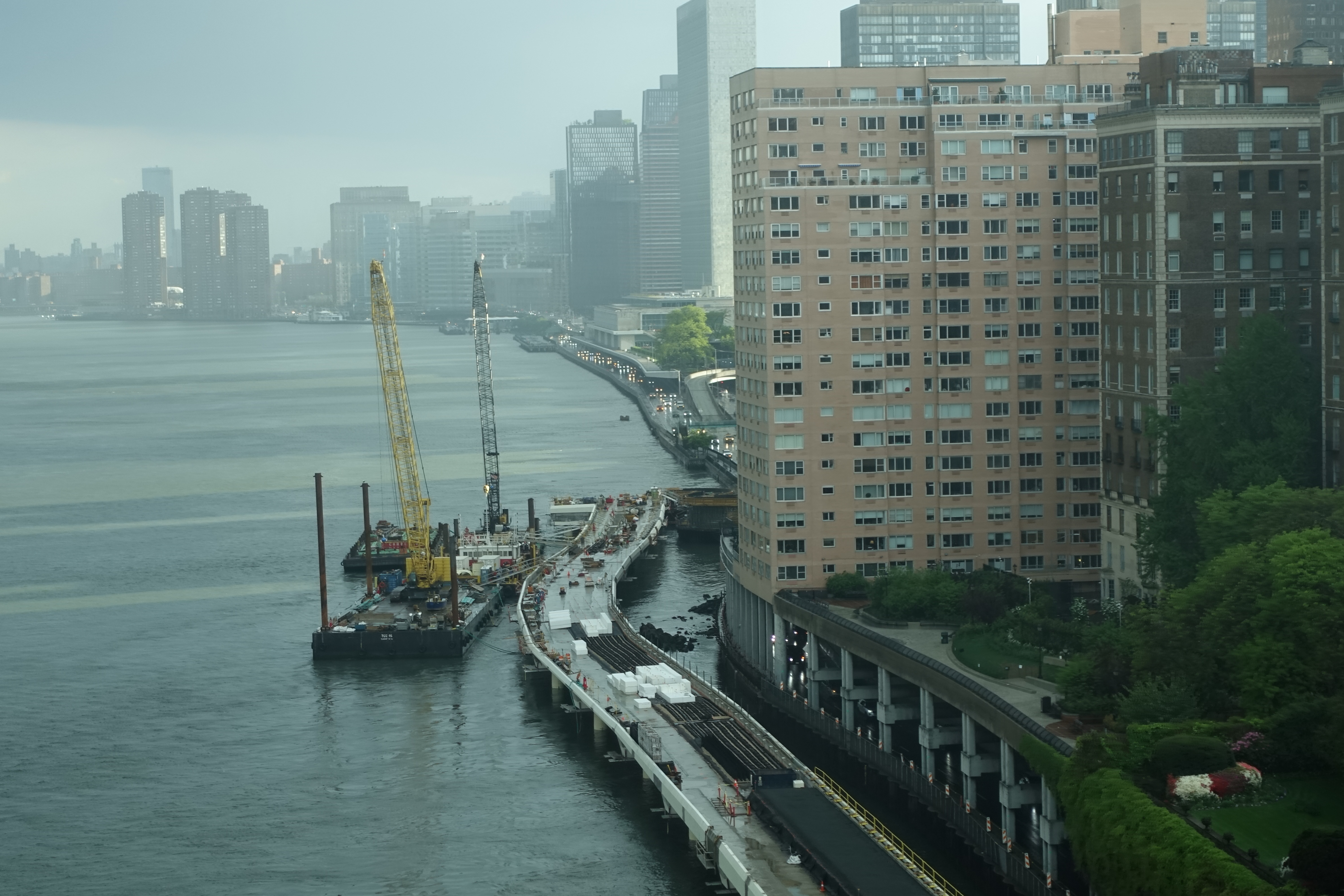
Construction of greenway between 53rd and 60th Streets in May 2022

The greenway section between 53rd and 60th streets began construction in November 2019. This section includes a new ADA-accessible bridge across the FDR Drive at 54th Street that provides a connection to the north end of Sutton Place Park South. The existing pedestrian footbridge at 51st Street and Peter Detmold Park was not used as an access point as it contains stairs on both sides and is not ADA-accessible. The 114-foot-long (35 m) bridge was fabricated in Nova Scotia, assembled in Brooklyn, and hoisted into place during a single overnight shift. The greenway segment was originally planned to utilize concrete pilings left in the river from a temporary outboard roadway that served as a detour for traffic during reconstruction of the FDR Drive. Installed in 2004, the pilings were scheduled to be dismantled in 2006 but were kept in place for a future extension of the waterfront esplanade. When the new segment was designed, it was decided to remove the old pilings and install new supports as it would cost more to retrofit the old pilings, which did not have the capacity to support the weight of the landscaping elements in the design for the new esplanade. New piles were driven to depths down to 130 feet (40 m) and were socketed into bedrock to support a 40-foot-wide (12 m) deck made of sections of precast concrete that has bike and pedestrian paths with a stormwater catchment system to irrigate the trees and plantings. The 53rd–60th Streets section of the greenway opened December 19, 2023.

In August 2024, the New York City Economic Development Corporation (EDC) announced plans to complete the greenway between 41st and 53rd streets. The extension would cost $120 million and open in 2028. The project would be funded by the city government, as the UN had reneged on a previous promise to fund the extension of the greenway.

=== Murray Hill/Kips Bay/Waterside ===
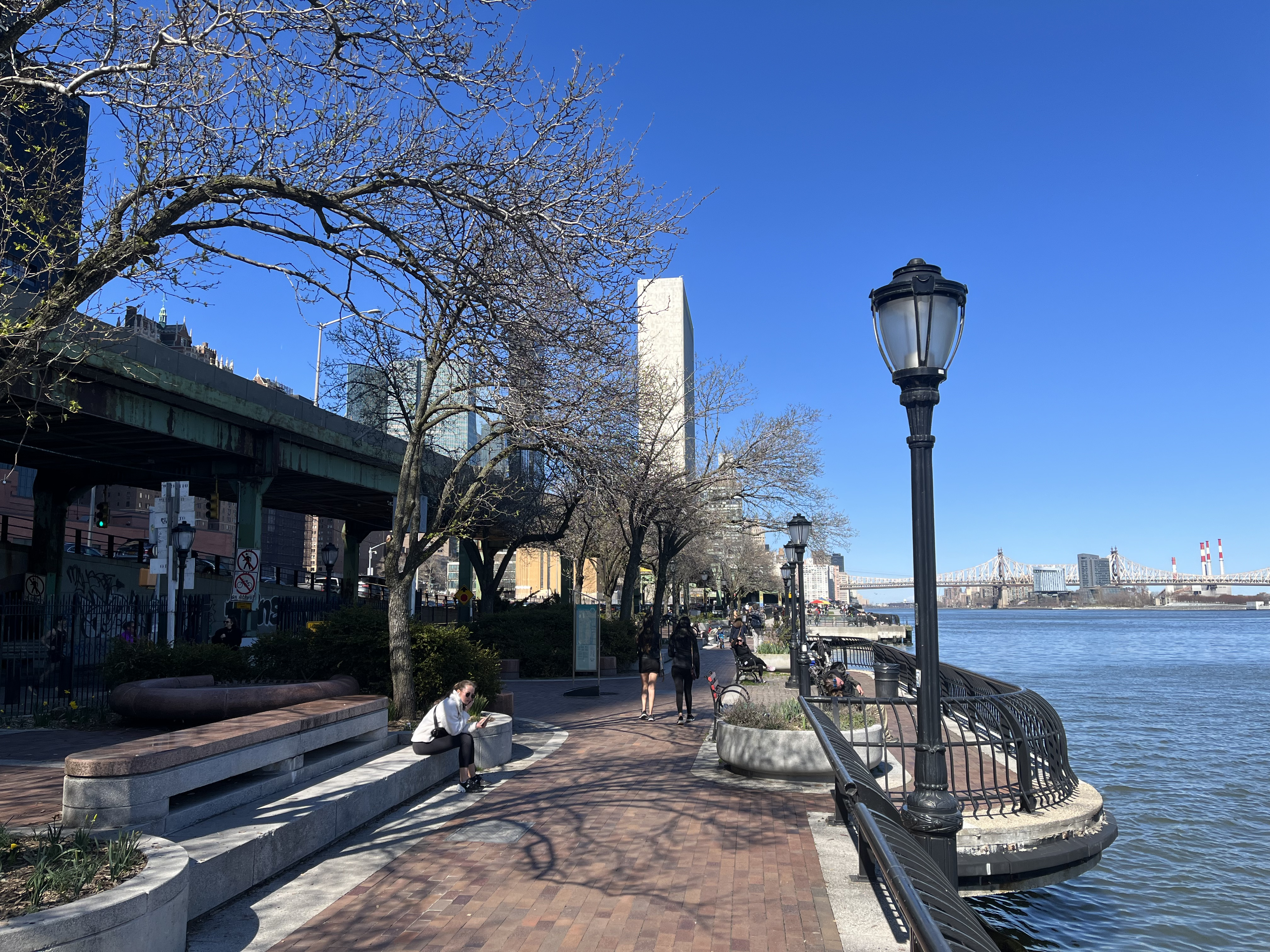
East River Esplanade Park, with the cantilevered overlook at 37th Street

South of the United Nations, the greenway enters East River Esplanade Park via a pedestrian underpass at 37th Street. Also known as Glick Park, East River Esplanade Park runs from 38th to 36th streets and was completed in 1992 by The Glick Organization in connection with City Planning Commission requirements to construct The Horizon, a high-rise condominium located on 37th Street between First Avenue and the FDR Drive. Approvals from 14 agencies were needed before construction of the park could begin, a process which took two years to complete. The park cost over $4 million and was designed by Thomas Balsley Associates, the same firm that had prepared a 1987 master plan for the future development of a waterfront esplanade between 41st and 34th streets for Community Board 6.

The entrance plaza of East River Esplanade Park at 37th Street was designed to include two small fountains made out of polished stone and an overlook cantilevered 12 feet (3.7 m) over the river. On the north and south of the entrance plaza, the rear sections of the esplanade were slightly elevated on a podium to provide unobstructed views of the river. The site of the park had been previously proposed by UNDC as the location of two 27-story apartment buildings to provide more housing for families of United Nations staff—a project that would have also included the development of a public promenade along the waterfront from 36th to 51st streets to gain the support of Community Board 6.

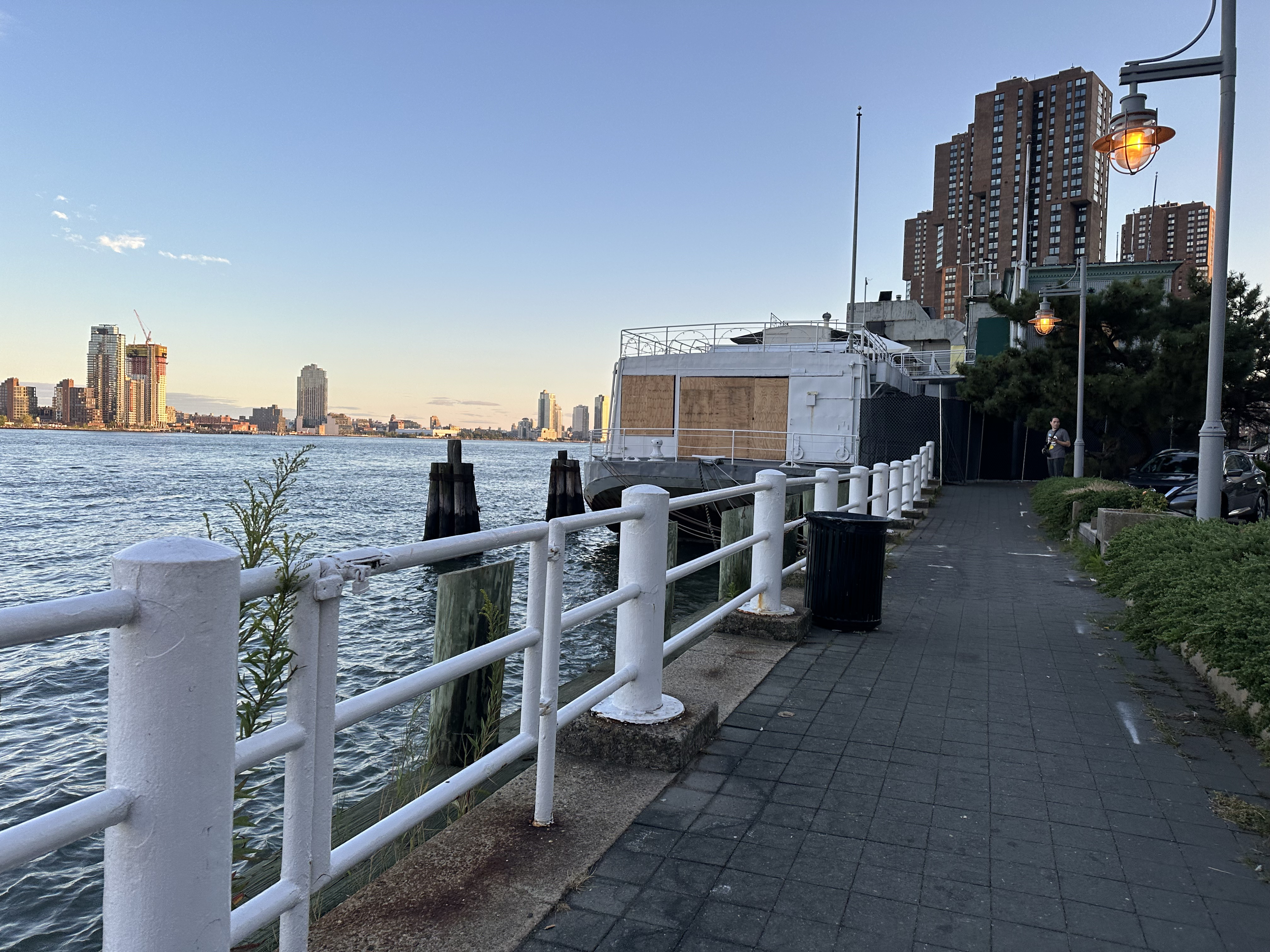
Greenway segment located north of The Water Club in 2024

The north end of East River Esplanade Park currently provides the only connection to Waterside Pier, which runs from 38th to 41st streets. South of East River Esplanade Park, the approximately three-quarters-mile (1.2 km) portion of the greenway, accessed by pedestrian crosswalks at 35th and 34th streets, contains the East 34th Street Ferry Landing, the East 34th Street Heliport and the former site of The Water Club. The section of the esplanade between 34th and 36th streets was improved in the mid-2000s with installation of new pavement, benches, landscaping, lighting, and railing as part of upgrades made to the adjacent ferry landing. The waterfront promenade on the north side of The Water Club was designed by M. Paul Friedberg and built by the restaurant as a required public amenity. The city has allocated funds to replace the parking lot that was formerly located at the foot of 34th Street with new open space and plans to create a "pop-up park" with turf, planters, benches, tables, and shade structures; the parking facility had been used by employees of NYU Langone Health and was removed in August 2025 after its lease expired. The new public open space at 34th Street is expected to be completed in Spring 2026.

The greenway portion and the apartment buildings that make up Waterside Plaza (as well as the neighboring United Nations International School) were constructed on top of platforms supported by over 2,000 concrete piles sunk into the East River. Developed by Richard Ravitch, the first apartment buildings opened in 1973 and the complex and greenway section was completed the following year.

In 2016, the New York City Department of Transportation announced plans to install bike lanes along the northbound service road of the FDR Drive from East 25th to East 34th streets to improve access for bikes traveling alongside The Water Club and Waterside Plaza. The bike lanes along this segment of the greenway were installed in 2019.

=== Stuyvesant Cove Park ===
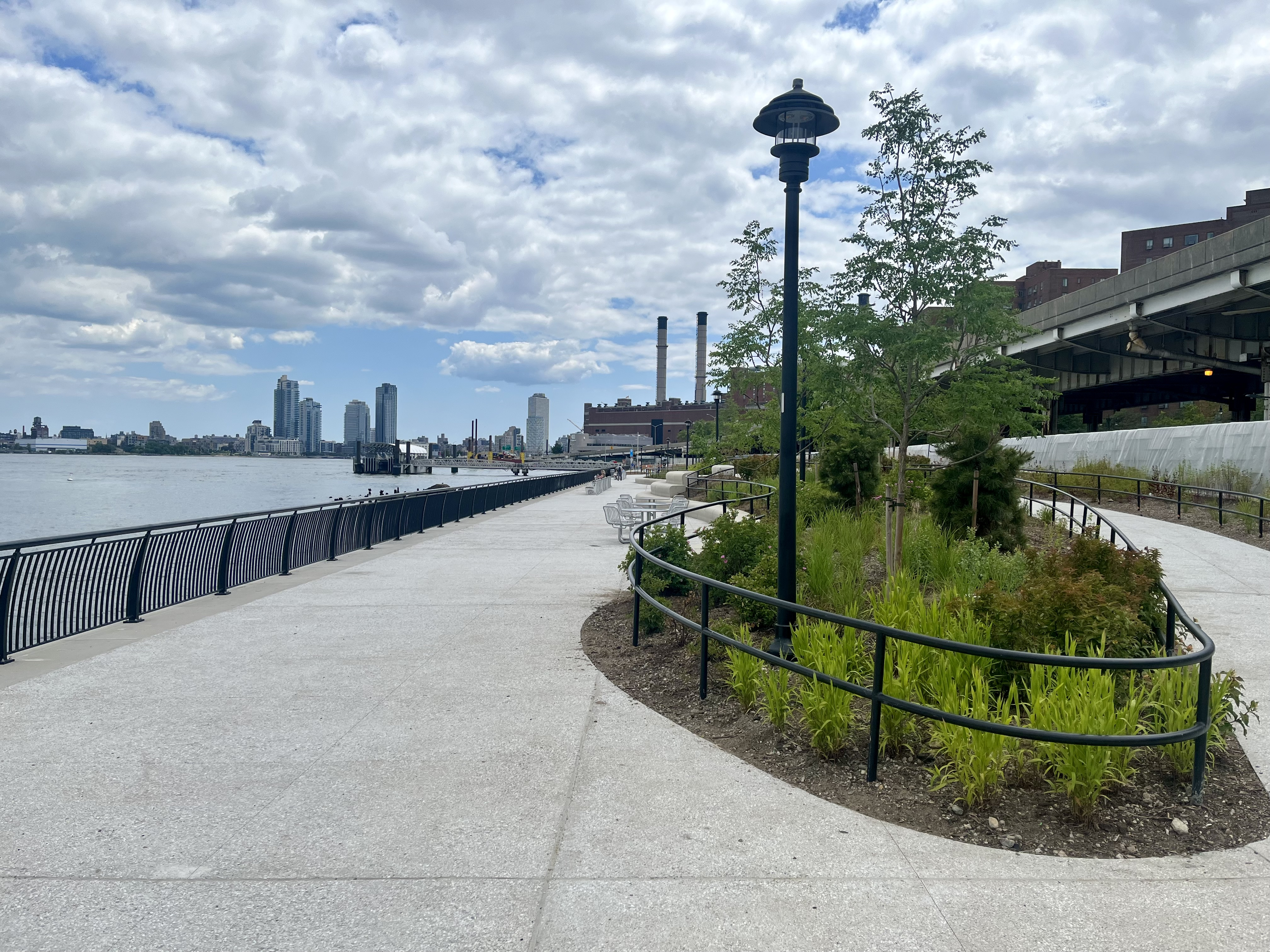
Looking south from Stuyvesant Cove Park

The greenway enters Stuyvesant Cove Park (at 40°43′59.5″N 73°58′26.5″W), a 1.9-acre (7,700 m^{2}) public park that runs from 23rd Street to 18th Street, east of Avenue C. It is located to the south of Waterside Plaza and to the north of the East River Park, connecting to the Captain Patrick J. Brown Walk on the south end.

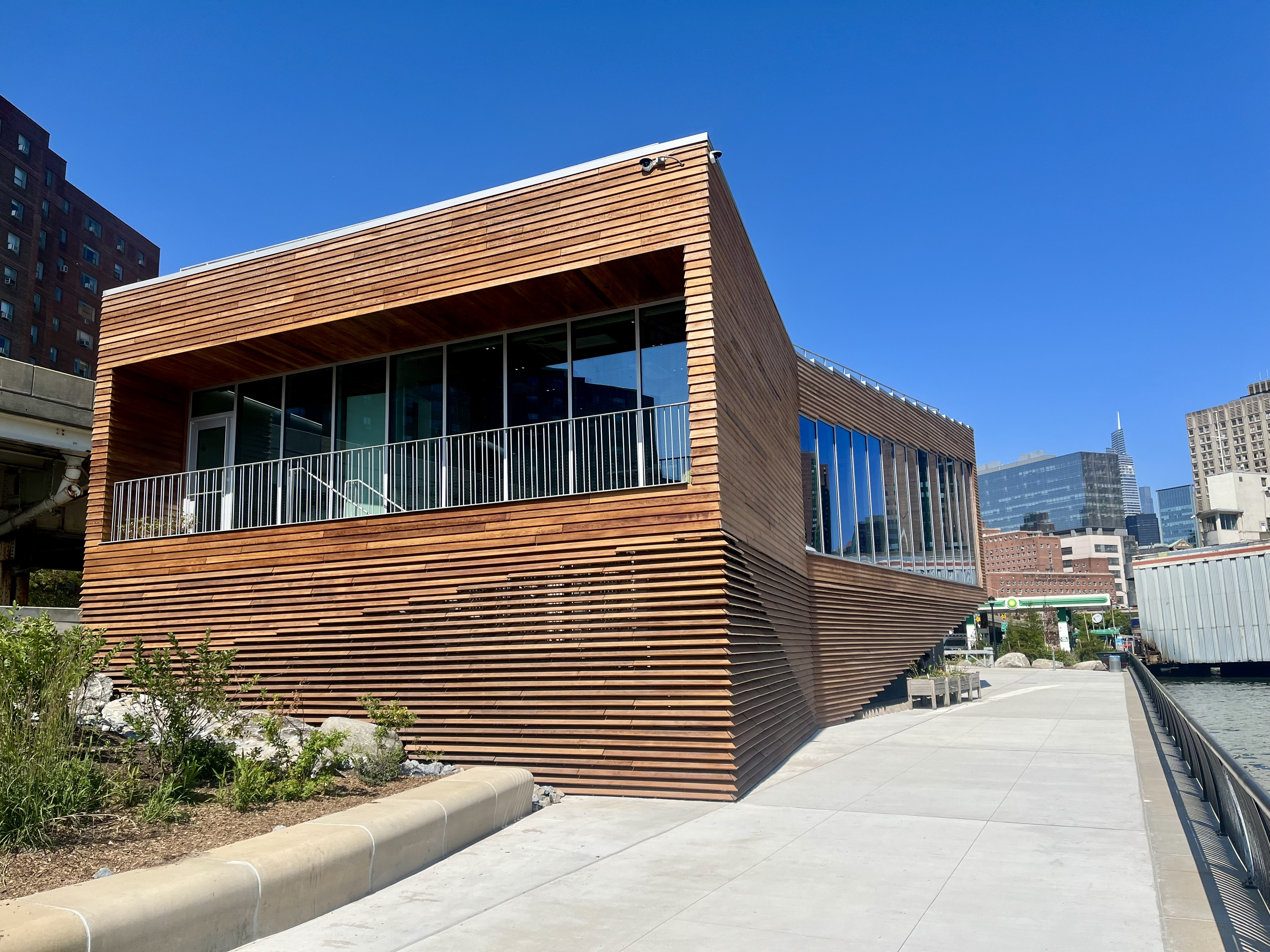
The esplanade adjacent to the Solar 1 environmental learning center

The park is located on the former brownfield site of a cement plant and a parking lot. The Riverwalk mixed-use development that would have included residential units, offices, a hotel and a marina was proposed in the 1980s but abandoned in 1992. A plan released in 1997 gave way to the current park. Surplus cement dumped from trucks into the East River has created a small beach in the middle of the park near the end of 20th Street.

The park, which was completed in 2002, cost $8.3 million and was designed by Donna Walcavage Landscape Architecture. From 2020 to 2023, the entire park was demolished and reconstructed in order to build a new floodwall with flood gates as part of the city's East Side Coastal Resiliency project. Solar 1, an environmental learning center, is located at the north end of the park.

=== Captain Patrick J. Brown Walk ===
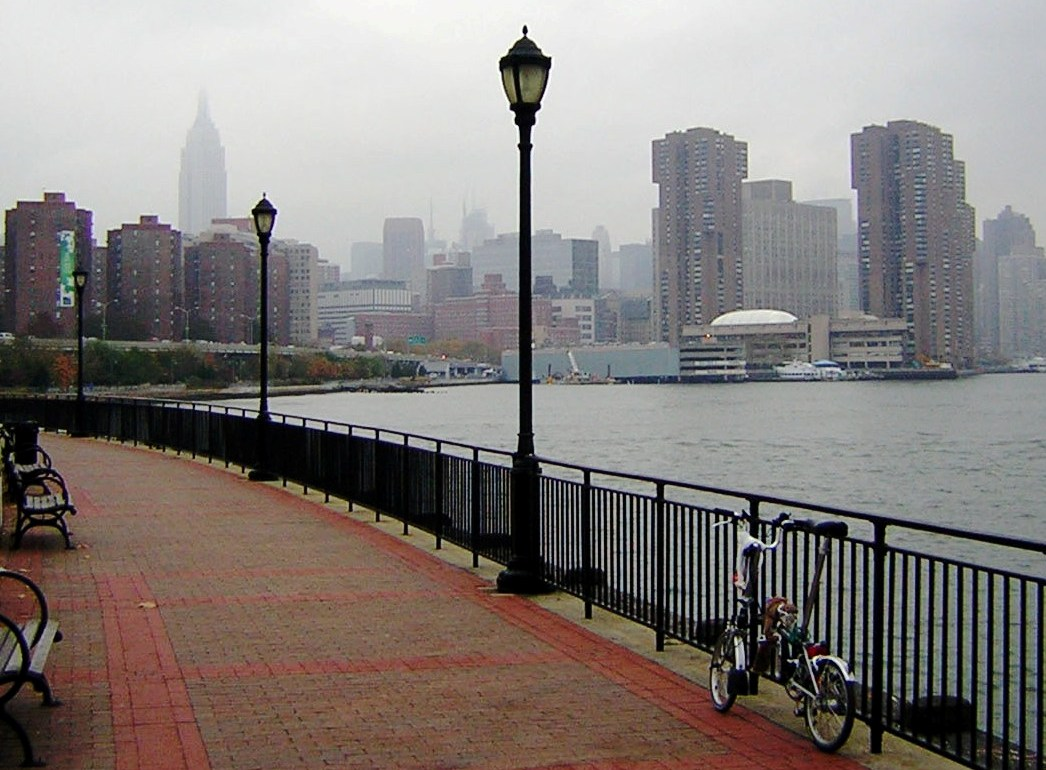
View of Midtown Manhattan skyline from Captain Patrick J. Brown Walk

The next part of the greenway is the Captain Patrick J. Brown Walk (at 40°43′51″N 73°58′23″W), a brick-paved walkway that connects Stuyvesant Cove Park on the north to East River Park to the south. Designed for use by pedestrians and cyclists, it runs approximately between 15th and 18th streets, and Avenues C and D, and was named in 2002.

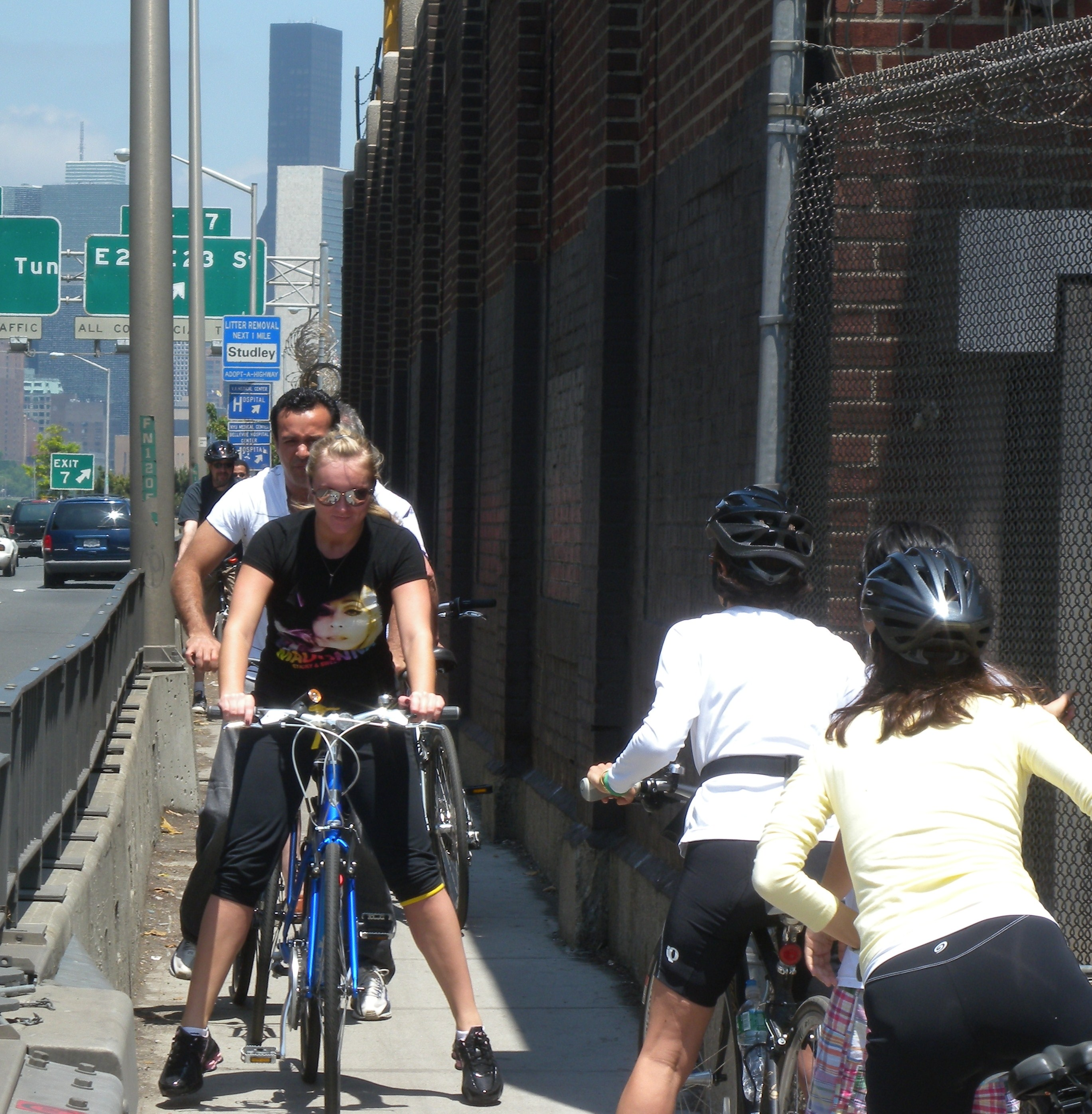
Bottleneck on greenway near 14th Street

The walk was named after Captain Patrick J. Brown, a firefighter who died in the September 11 attacks, and who lived in nearby Stuyvesant Town. The property is owned by the New York State Department of Transportation. Paul Goldberger, an architectural critic for The New York Times, has noted that the adjacent cove in the river "makes this one of the only places on the Manhattan shore that offers a splendid view back toward the borough's skyline."

The 2013 East River Blueway plan recommended replacing a bottleneck on the greenway located near 14th Street with an elevated path above the FDR Drive. This portion of the path narrows to 4 to 5 feet (1.2 to 1.5 m) in width adjacent to Con Edison's East River Generating Station. Footings for the new flyover bridge, which will span over the FDR Drive from 13th to 15th streets, are being installed as part of the city's East Side Coastal Resiliency project. The bridge will be subsequently built as part of a separate construction project. Funding has been set aside for construction of the new flyover, which was estimated to cost $151.5 million. In 2026, work began on the 14th Street Connector, a $163 million project to widen the bottleneck.

=== East River Park ===
Officially called the "East River Waterfront Esplanade", the greenway goes into East River Park (at 40°43′03″N 73°58′27″W), which is a 57.5-acre (20 ha) public park located on the Lower East Side. The park stretches from East 12th Street down to Montgomery Street on the east side of the FDR Drive. The southern entrance boasts good views of the Manhattan Bridge and Brooklyn Bridge. The amphitheater, built in 1941 just south of Grand Street, has been reconstructed and is often used for public performances. The park includes football, baseball and soccer fields, tennis, basketball and handball courts, a running track, and bike paths. Fishing is another popular activity. The park is bisected by the Williamsburg Bridge.

=== East River Waterfront ===
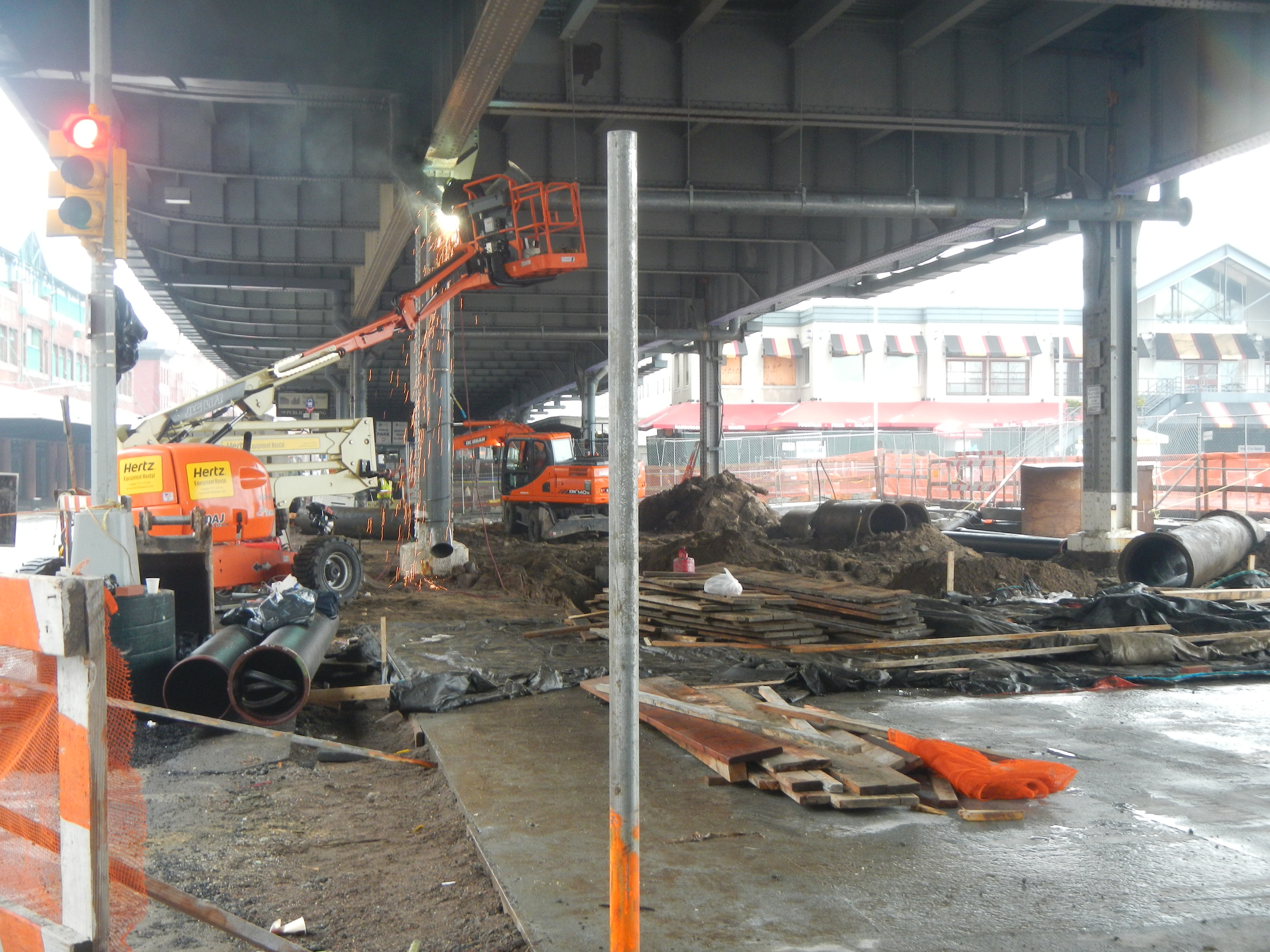
Construction site, 2013

The last part of the greenway is the East River Waterfront Project, also referred to as the "East River Esplanade", though the latter name includes other features along the waterfront. It consists of two miles (3.2 km) along the East River waterfront between Montgomery Street, along South Street, to the Battery Maritime Building east of Battery Park. A bike lane in Pike Street connects to the Manhattan Bridge. The project aims to rehabilitate the existing waterfront space and connect it to two existing waterfront parks, Battery Park and East River Park. Upon completion in 2015, the East River Esplanade is slated to feature three rebuilt piers (14, 15, and 35) new glass pavilions underneath the elevated FDR Drive, new bike lanes, recreational facilities, and waterfront seating.

==== Origins ====
The East River waterfront in Lower Manhattan was known for heavy maritime activity, with over 40 piers in operation by the later 1950s. The busy waterfront provided easy access to New York Harbor and the Atlantic Ocean in the south, the Hudson River on the west, with a connection to the Erie Canal. However, the rise of truck traffic and the transfer of port activity to the Port Newark-Elizabeth Marine Terminal drastically reduced maritime traffic on the river after the middle 20th century. With many piers now defunct, ambitious plans have been made to reclaim and reuse the pier space. The north–south arterial highway, the FDR Drive, was moved to an elevated location to allow convenient access to the piers. In the 1970s, the Water Street Access Plan was drafted to extend the confines of the traditional Financial District eastward and create a new business corridor along Water Street, south of Fulton Street. Noting the success of the World Financial Center, the East Side Landing plan was created in the 1980s to add commercial and office buildings along the waterfront, again south of Fulton Street, similar to Battery Park City. This plan never materialized.

In 1982, there was a plan to expand the Seaport Museum of New York and attract tourist activity. Parts of the district were devoted to retail, including the main building of the Fulton Fish Market. A modern shopping mall was then built on Pier 17 and was opened on September 11, 1985. Furthermore, the Fulton Fish Market formerly located around South Street and Fulton Street, was pressured to relocate in 2005 to Hunts Point in the Bronx due to plans for the redevelopment of the Manhattan waterfront.

The pedestrian and bike path was first established in the late 1990s between Montgomery Street on the Lower East Side and Broad Street in the Financial District. Benches were also added along the partially restored waterfront. The pedestrian path/bikeway has been well received by community members. Drawbacks exist however:

- The pedestrian path and bikeway are not segregated from each other; there is one lane in each direction which is shared by pedestrians and bikers.
- The path curves around FDR Drive viaduct pillars.
- The path occupies a narrow portion of the space below the viaduct; in most cases, the rest of the space is used as parking facilities and storage space.
- Amenities are few.
- Its legacy as a service and commercial zone offer limited pedestrian access.
- City services, such as the Department of Sanitation, use the waterfront for equipment.

During Michael Bloomberg's tenure as mayor, he spearheaded the PlaNYC 2030 initiative, which highlights projects and plans to transform the city by the year 2030. An important focus was put on the waterfront, including the East River waterfront. Bloomberg also stressed the importance of ferry transport, as an alternative to existing land transport options. The Pier 11/Wall Street ferry terminal has long operated East River waterfront, with regular trips to New Jersey. In June 2011, a ferry service to piers on Brooklyn's waterfront started.

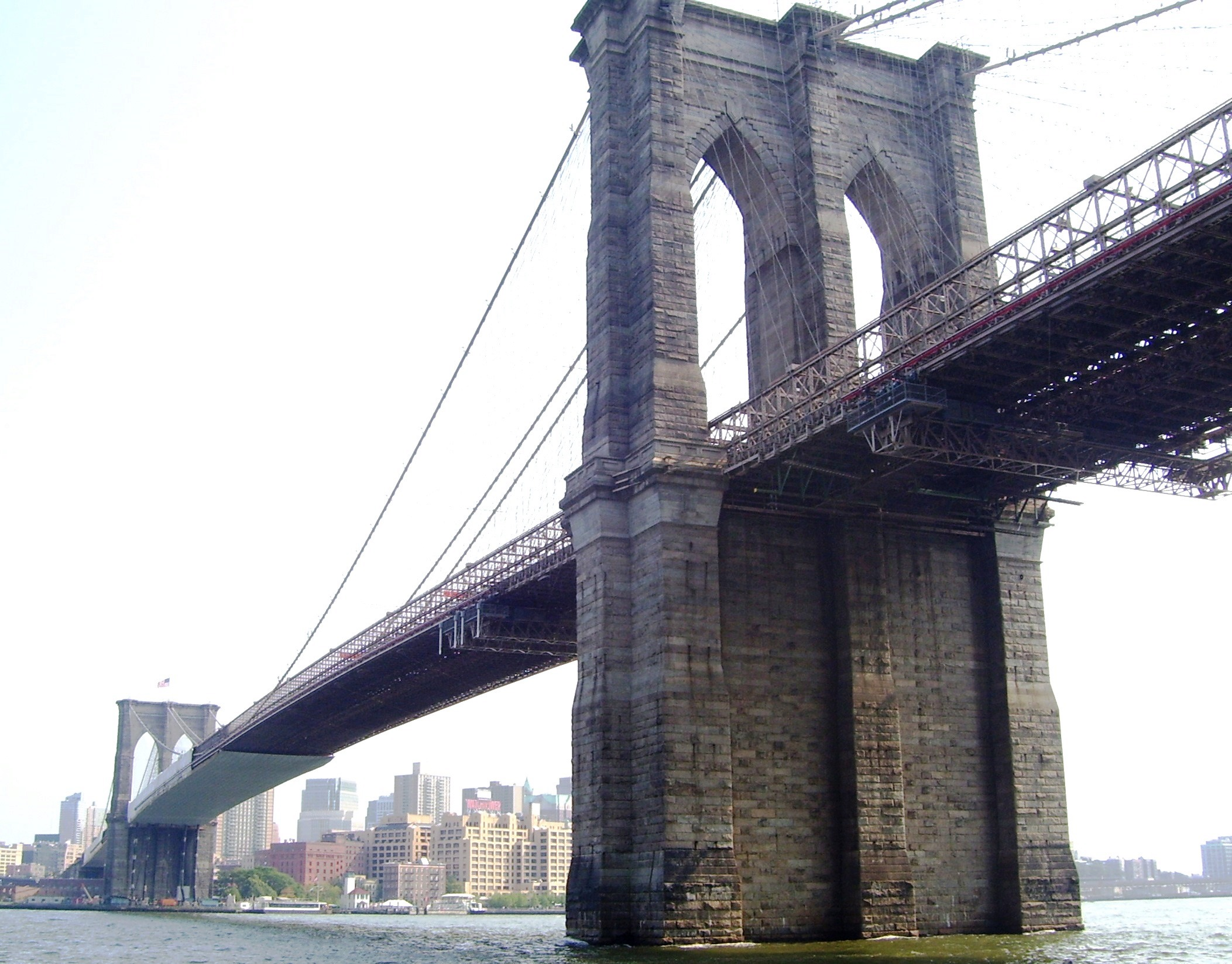
The Brooklyn Bridge as seen from the East River Esplanade

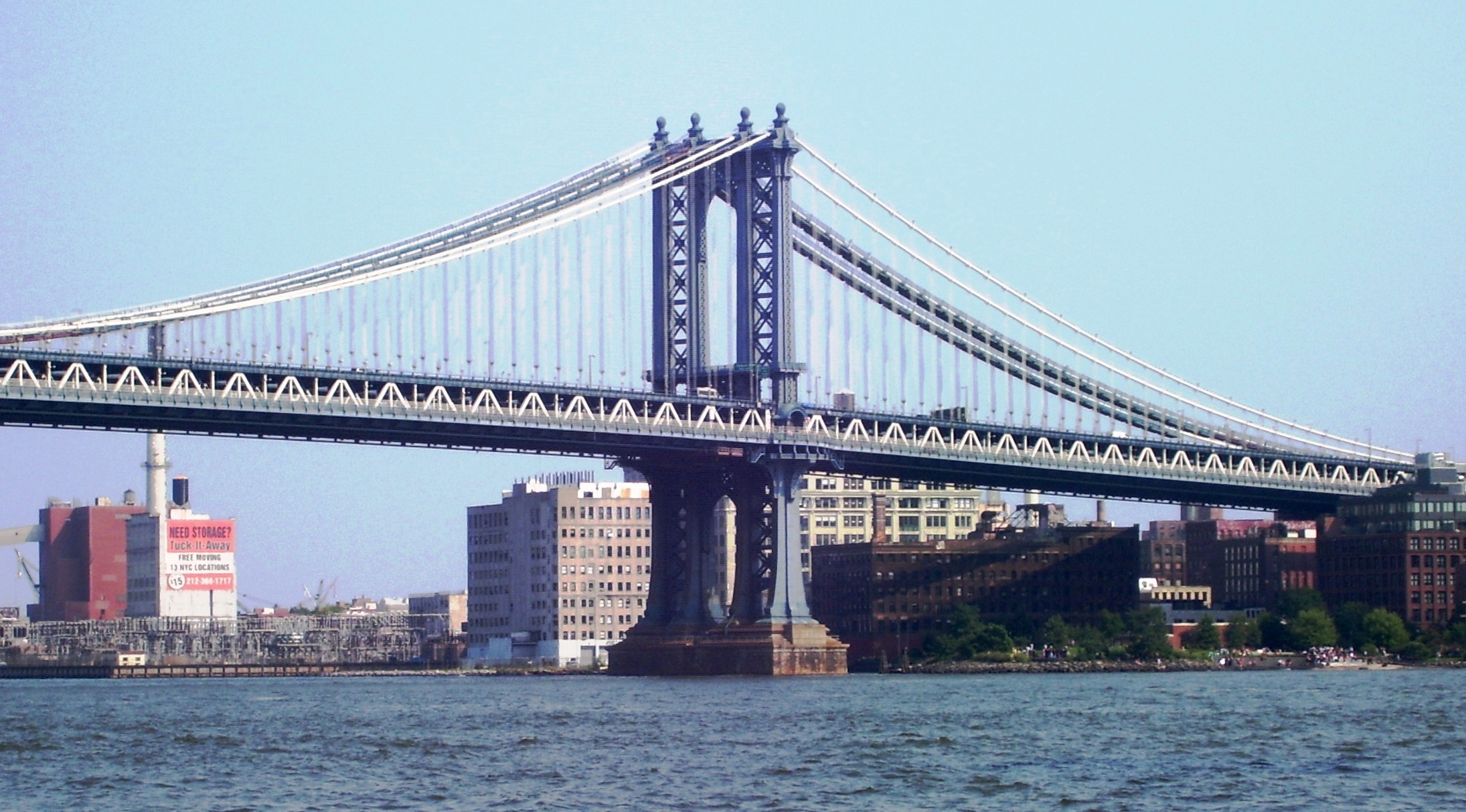
The Manhattan Bridge as seen from the East River Esplanade

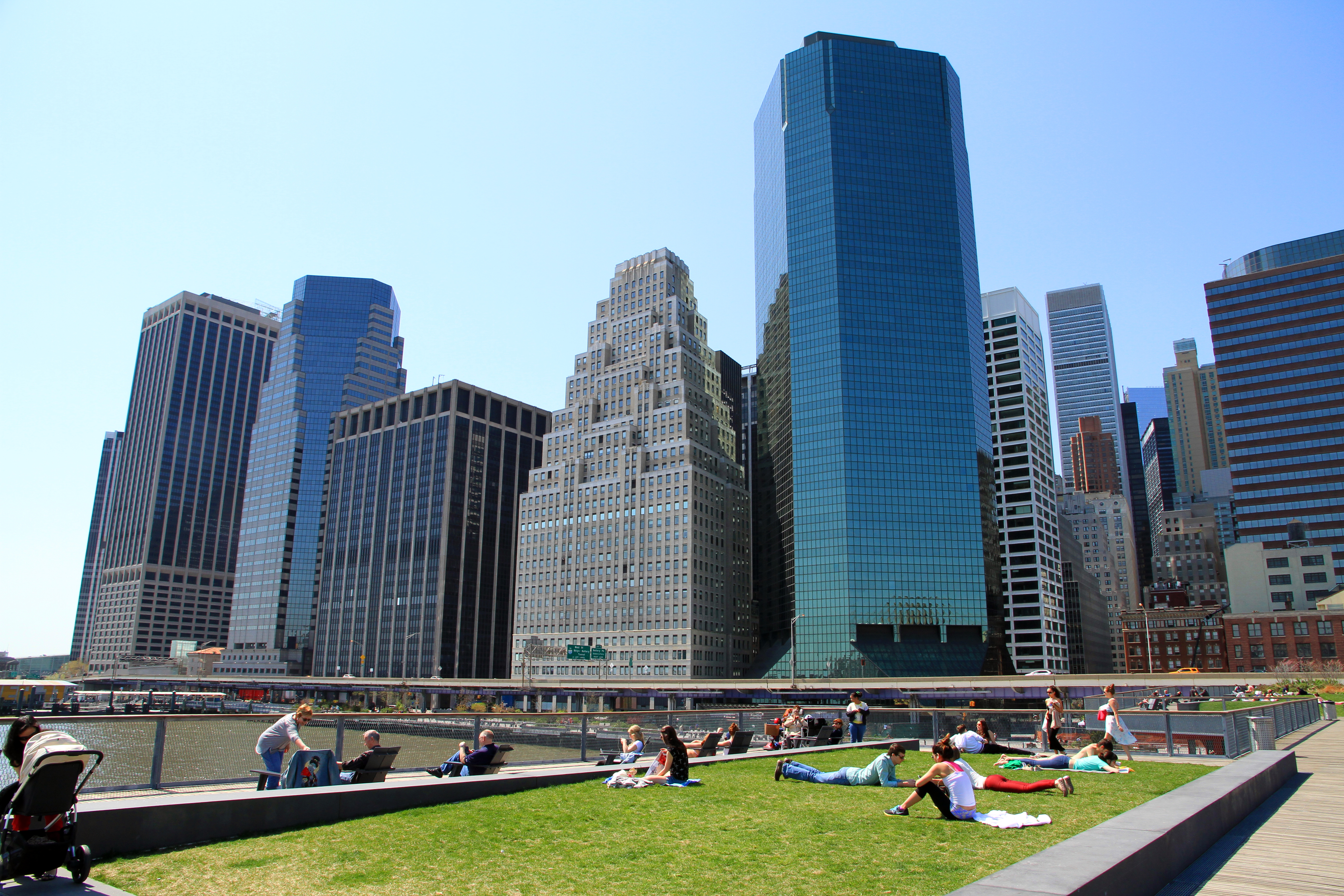
Pier 15

==== Renovation ====
SHoP Architects led the design process in the creation of the East River Esplanade, consulting community members during the planning years between 2002 and 2006. A year-long study was undertaken in 2004, allowing designers to derive ways that would "enhance waterfront access". Other groups critical to the project's planning phase include the New York City Department of Transportation, the Department of Parks and Recreation, the Economic Development Corporation, the Department of City Planning and other agencies and groups. $137 million was secured with the Lower Manhattan Development Corporation, and work began on a "pilot section" in 2009 between John Street and Wall Street.

According to the Department of City Planning, the overall plan is listed as:

- The esplanade itself: The new esplanade will consist of a recreation zone along the water's edge with seating and plantings, pavilions under the FDR Drive to support outdoor activities, and a bikeway along South Street that ties into the Manhattan Greenway. Consistent paving, seating, railings, and lighting will be used throughout.
- Pavilions and "get-downs": New, proposed pavilions will help reconnect the city to the river's edge, creating concentrated areas for recreation where appropriate. At Peck Slip and Rutgers Slip, the new esplanade design will mark historic locations by carving steps into the bulkhead line—creating means to "get down" to the water.
- Archipelago: In order to provide a continuous greenway between Battery Park and the new East River Waterfront, the path between the Battery Maritime Building and Old Slip will be extended over the existing shoreline, creating a walkway out over the water with a view of the city.
- Pier 15: The proposed pier will lift its primary recreation area to a second tier, offering new and intimate views of the tall, historic ships that could be docked in this location.
- Pier 35: This large pier will be opened to the public with a second tier, which will function as an amphitheater that faces west-southwest toward Governors Island, Brooklyn, Battery Park and the New York Harbor. It is connected to the greenway by a bridge.
- Sustainability: In keeping with the city's PlaNYC initiatives, the East River Waterfront project will seek LEED certification for its pavilions and park uses. Plans aim to reduce energy demand and consumption, conserve natural resources, improve air quality, and catch and reuse rainwater.

The FDR Drive viaduct will be clad, and South Street will be narrowed for much of its length to make room for additional sidewalk space. The glass pavilions will be located underneath the viaduct, and the bike lanes would be moved to the side of the pavilion, underneath the FDR Drive. The piers would be reconstructed to encourage marine growth, by having reef balls to attract fish populations.

Access to the Esplanade from the neighboring areas would be undertaken with the redevelopment of "slips" - wedge-shaped road shapes which previously allowed ships to berth. Some of these slips have been used as parking facilities, while others are the southern termini for critical north–south thoroughfares. Reconstructions of the existing slips in the Financial District, the Lower East Side and Chinatown will feature bikeways and landscaped medians. Five of these slip projects are at varying stages of construction. From east to west, they are Montgomery Slip, Rutgers Slip, Pike Slip, Peck Slip, and Burling Slip.

===== Renovation phases =====
The project was undertaken in three phases, with first phase completed (including Pier 15). Second phase construction started in summer 2011 (from Old Slip to the Battery Maritime Building). Construction on the third phase (Pike Slip to Pier 35, Montgomery Slip) began in fall 2011. This phase covered the rehabilitation underneath the FDR Drive from Maiden Lane to Pier 35. Phase 4 between Catherine and Pike Slips was completed in 2015. In 2019, the EDC announced plans to spend $21 million upgrading the segment between Catherine and Peck slips.

== Storm barrier ==
There are plans for a new storm barrier along the southern third of the greenway, between West 57th and East 42nd Streets. The final proposal, which is geographically U-shaped, will include many features. Under the elevated FDR Drive structure above South Street, storm barriers will hang from the viaduct's ceiling, and drop down in case of a storm. A "Battery Berm" will be located at Battery Park, and a maritime museum will be opened on the site of a former Coast Guard building there. The proposal, by Rebuild by Design, will also include components for storm barriers in Hunts Point, Bronx and on Staten Island. The first component, a 2.19-mile-long (4 km) barrier on the Lower East Side between Montgomery and East 13th Streets called "The Bridging Berm", will cost $335 million. In addition to storm protection, the berm—the first of three of the barrier's components—will also provide a pedestrian pathway and bikeway on top of the berm, boating and fishing docks, a slope down to current sports fields, upgraded ADA-accessible ramps for bridges across the FDR Drive, and construction materials such as "slurry walls, concrete blocks, a compacted embankment, a clay cap, topsoil and salt-tolerant landscaping." The total cost of the project is over $3.5 billion.
