= Community Environmental Center =

- Company type: 501(c)3 Not For Profit Corporation
- Founded: 1994
- Founder: Richard M. Cherry
- Defunct: 2014
- Headquarters: Long Island City, NY 11101
- Website: www.cecenter.org

Community Environmental Center (commonly referred to as CEC) was a not-for-profit provider of weatherization services for low-income eligible buildings and green building and sustainability services for all types of organizations in the New York City region. CEC was founded in 1994 to improve the lives of low-income families by making their homes more efficient, but then expanded to provide many different green building services to all types of buildings and organizations.

Community Environmental Center closed its doors in 2014.

In 2001, CEC created Solar 1 as an education and arts organization in Manhattan's Stuyvesant Cove Park.

In 2009, CEC partnered with the New York Mayor's Office on the NYC Cool Roofs pilot program, which was created to paint building roofs a reflective white color, and lower their impact on global warming.

== Weatherization Provider ==
CEC provided weatherization services to low-income housing through the national Weatherization Assistance Program, and was the implementer for parts of Brooklyn (Kings County) and Queens County.

== Energy Modeling and Green Building Services ==
CEC was a partnering Technical Assistance firm with NYSERDA in order to provide incentives to building owners and developers who build or renovate efficiently. CEC did work on the Multifamily Performance Program and the New Construction Program, among others.

CEC provided energy and LEED consulting services on two projects that have won the NYC Department of Environmental Protection's Green Building Design Competition: 1347 Bristow Street and The Lee. Both are low income housing multifamily buildings in New York City.

Enterprise Green Communities listed CEC as an approved Technical Assistance Provider. The Green Communities Criteria is an alternative to LEED, targeted at low-income housing.

== Additional Services That Were Provided by CEC ==
- Commissioning
- Cellulose Insulation and Air Sealing
- Green Operations Manuals
- Capital Needs Assessments
- Energy Auditing
