= Stuyvesant Cove Park =

Public park in Manhattan, New York

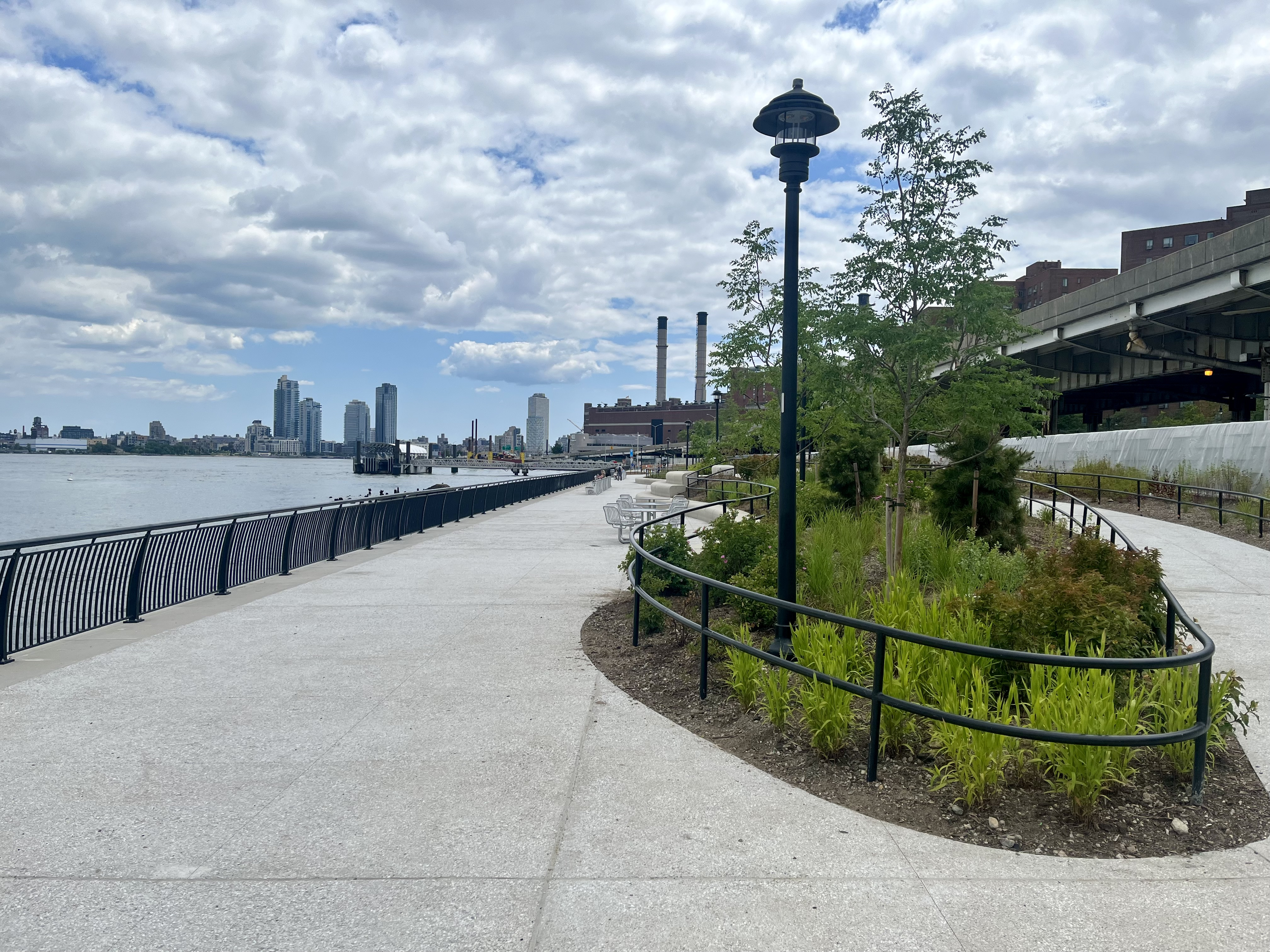
- Stuyvesant Cove Park in 2023
- Interactive map of Stuyvesant Cove Park
- Location: Manhattan, New York
- Coordinates: 40°43′59.5″N 73°58′26.5″W
- Area: 1.9 acres (0.77 ha)
- Opened: 2002
- Etymology: named after Peter Stuyvesant
- Owner: New York City Department of Small Business Services
- Manager: Solar One (on behalf of New York City Economic Development Corporation)

Stuyvesant Cove Park is a 1.9-acre (7,700 m^{2}) public park on the East Side of the New York City borough of Manhattan that runs from 18th Street to 23rd Street between the FDR Drive and the East River. Part of the East River Greenway, it is located to the south of the Waterside Plaza apartment complex, to the east of Stuyvesant Town–Peter Cooper Village, and to the north of the East River Park, and connects to the Captain Patrick J. Brown Walk on the south end. Stuyvesant Cove is served by the NYC Ferry Soundview route.

== History ==
=== Planning and construction ===
Located on what was once the brownfield site of a former ready-mix concrete plant and a parking lot, the park was created after the failure of the proposed Riverwalk mixed-use development that would have included residential units, offices, a hotel and a marina. Surplus concrete dumped from trucks into the East River has created a small beach in the middle of the park near the end of 20th Street, which is not intended to be accessed by pedestrians.

After the Riverwalk proposal was withdrawn, Manhattan Community Board 6 commissioned the landscape architecture firm of Heintz/Ruddick Associates to prepare an open space study for the site. The "Stuyvesant Cove Open Space Study" was completed in June 1993 in collaboration with Karahan/Schwarting Architecture Company and included plans for a waterfront park with a pedestrian esplanade, bike path, beach, boathouse for kayaks, dock with barges for sunbathing, 5,000-square-foot (460 m^{2}) environmental & education center, and restaurant and deck to be built above the parking garage at the adjacent Skyport Marina. The results of the open space study were incorporated into a 197-a plan submitted by Manhattan Community Board 6 in 1995, pursuant to Section 197-a of the New York City Charter. The 197-a plan was modified by the City Planning Commission and adopted by the City Council in 1997.

Advocates for a new waterfront park from Citizens United Against Riverwalk (CUAR), a neighborhood group that had opposed the Riverwalk mixed-use development proposal, formed a new group called the Stuyvesant Cove Park Association, which obtained federal, state, and city funding to finance the construction of the new park. The park, which was completed in 2002, cost $8.3 million and was designed by Donna Walcavage Landscape Architecture. Roadways in the surrounding area were reconfigured to maximize the size of the park, which included shifting the northbound service road of the FDR Drive from the east side to the west side of the elevated viaduct, converting Avenue C into a two-way boulevard between 18th Street and 23rd Street. The changes to the surrounding roadway network also extended northwards towards 25th Street where a new point of egress was added from Waterside Plaza to allow vehicles exiting the apartment complex to travel south and then under the FDR Drive viaduct to get to 23rd Street. Before the park was constructed all traffic exiting Waterside Plaza had to travel northbound to 34th Street.

=== Opening and early years ===
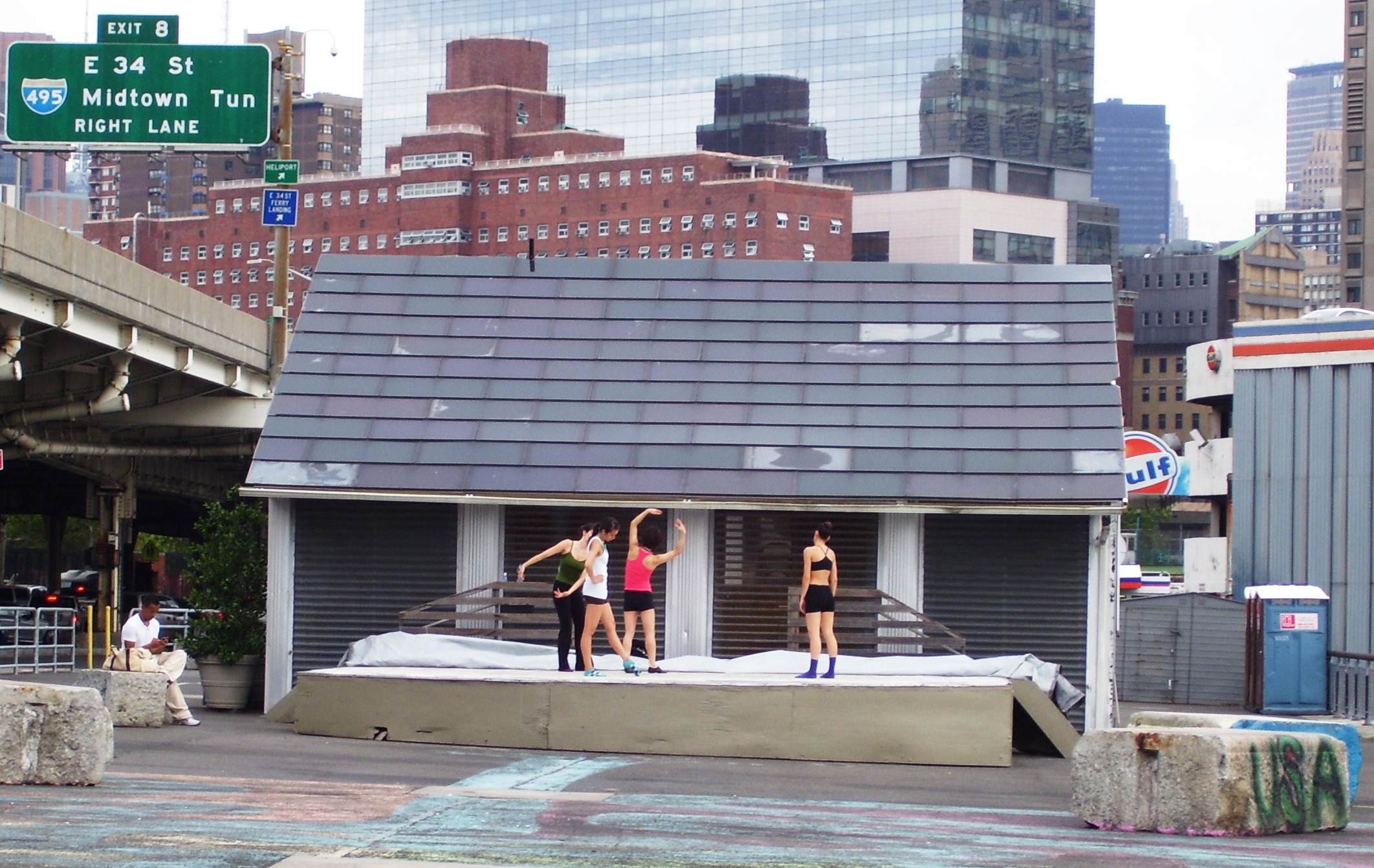
A dance company rehearses on the outdoor stage at Solar 1 in 2010

Solar 1, an environmental learning center with a small outdoor stage for public performances, opened at the north end of the park in 2003. The facility was a 500-square-foot (46 m^{2}) solar powered pavilion that was intended to be replaced by a larger building in the future. Community Environmental Center (CEC) agreed to maintain the new park for the New York City Economic Development Corporation (NYCEDC) in exchange for the use of city land for the environmental education center. CEC established "CEC Stuyvesant Cove, Inc." as a separate non-profit entity in 2004, which began using the name "Solar One" the following year.

Since its opening, Stuyvesant Cove Park has been planted with a variety of native plant species. The park was initially maintained by NYCEDC and most of the plantings died due to a lack of water. In 2002, when CEC was awarded the contract to take over the park, including its maintenance, Jon Cramer of CEC was titled the program director and he hired Jeff Tucker to be the first ever Chief Landscaper. Jon was responsible for constructing Solar 1, the first ever self-sustaining building in Manhattan running off of solar power. In 2018, park manager Emily Curtis-Murphy embarked on a program to showcase plant species originally native to Manhattan and Long Island in a manner that positions the park as an outdoor classroom for students attending local schools.

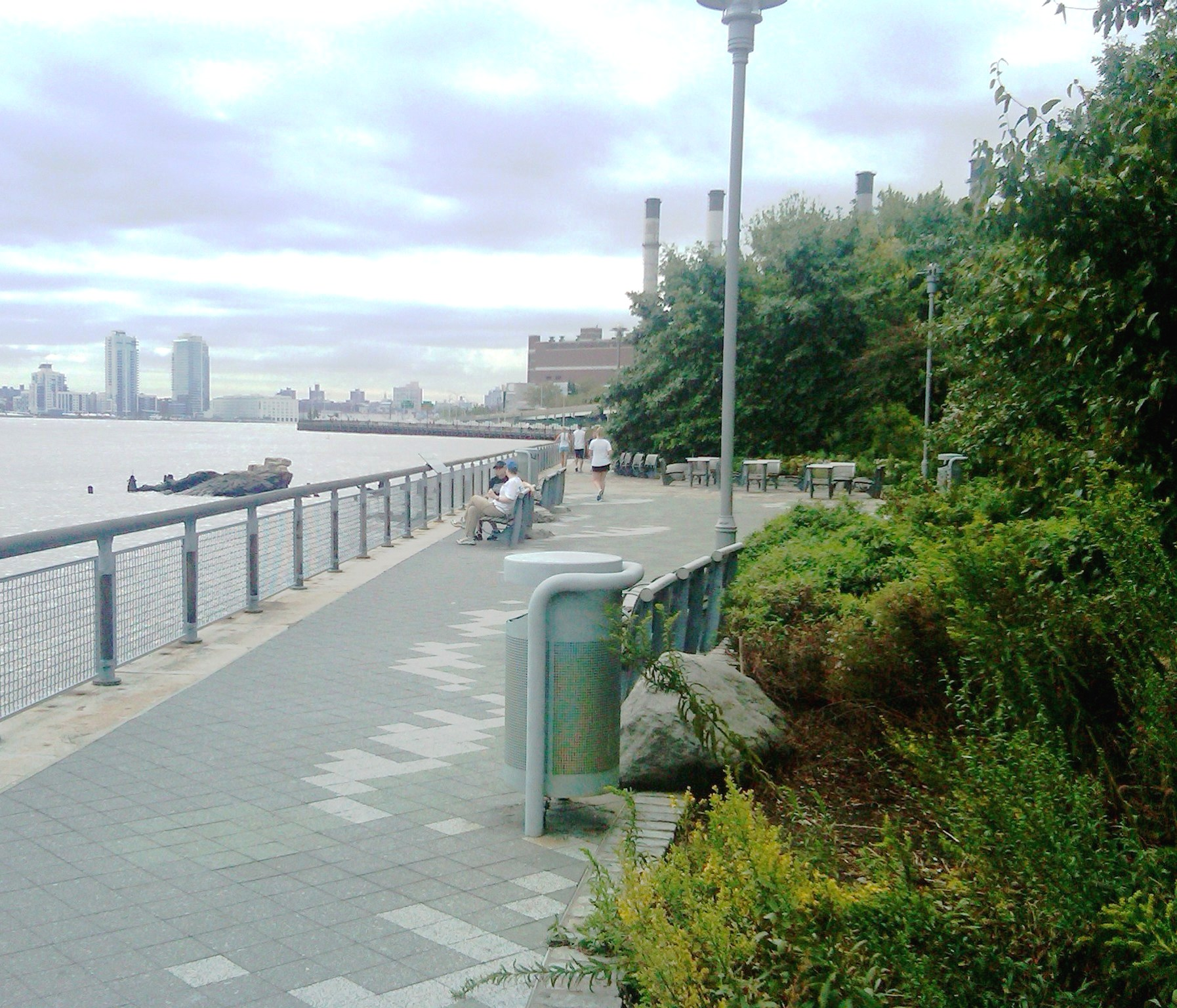
The park's walkway in 2011, prior to reconstruction for the floodwall

The western edge of the park contains a two-way bike path that runs alongside the FDR Drive viaduct. The eastern side of the park was designed to include a curved walkway of varying width that alternates between sections located adjacent to the bulkhead and others set back behind planting beds. Seating areas located within the park included covered gazebos, tables, chairs and benches designed by Carr, Lynch & Sandell.

In 2018, ferry service was added to the park with a stop on NYC Ferry's Lower East Side route. A new ferry landing was constructed near East 20th Street to accommodate NYC Ferry service, which consists of two 80-foot-long (24 m) gangways leading out from the bulkhead to a 35-by-90-foot (11 by 27 m) barge. The ferry landing has been served by NYC Ferry's Soundview route since 2020, when the Lower East Side route was discontinued.

=== East Side Coastal Resiliency project ===
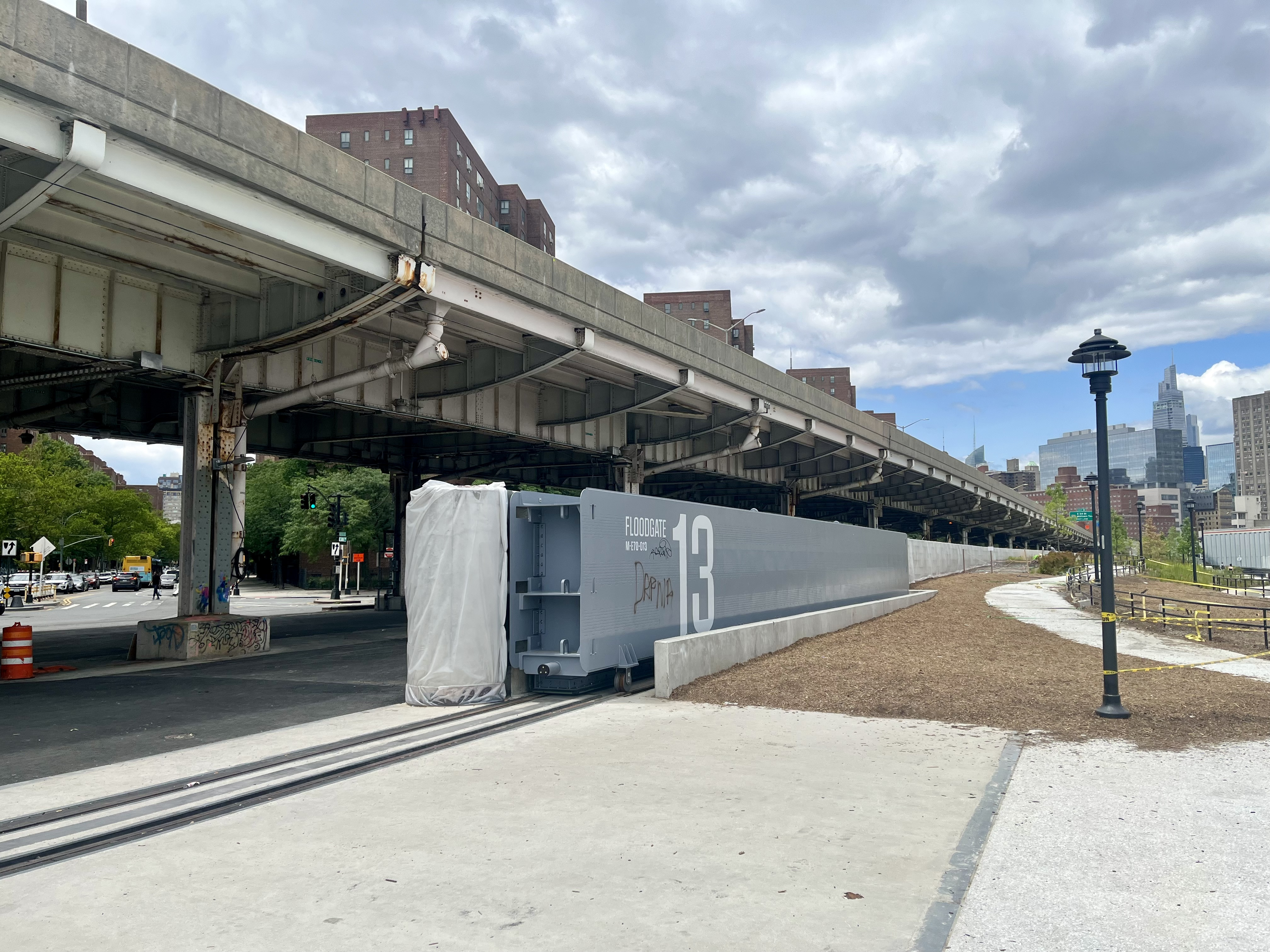
Floodwall and flood gate at East 20th Street entrance to park in 2023

The park was closed at the end of 2020 and rebuilt to allow for the construction of a new floodwall with flood gates as part of the city's East Side Coastal Resiliency project. The park was completely demolished in order to build the flood protection system. Prior to construction, thousands of native plants from the old park were donated by Solar One to over 30 community organizations in New York City. This project also removed the gazebos and some seating from the park, replacing it with stadium style seats and more tables. The northern section of the park was reopened to the public on May 31, 2023. The southern section of the park (south of 20th Street) was reopened in December 2023. The current park was designed by Mathews Nielsen Landscape Architects.

The parking lot under the FDR Drive viaduct adjacent to the park, which had been closed during construction of the floodwall, reopened at the beginning of 2024. Manhattan Community Board 6 and local residents have called for the parking facility to be converted into public space, similar to sections of the FDR Drive viaduct further downtown along South Street that include seating areas and recreational facilities such as courts and exercise equipment. The floodwall at Stuyvesant Cove Park was finished in late 2024.

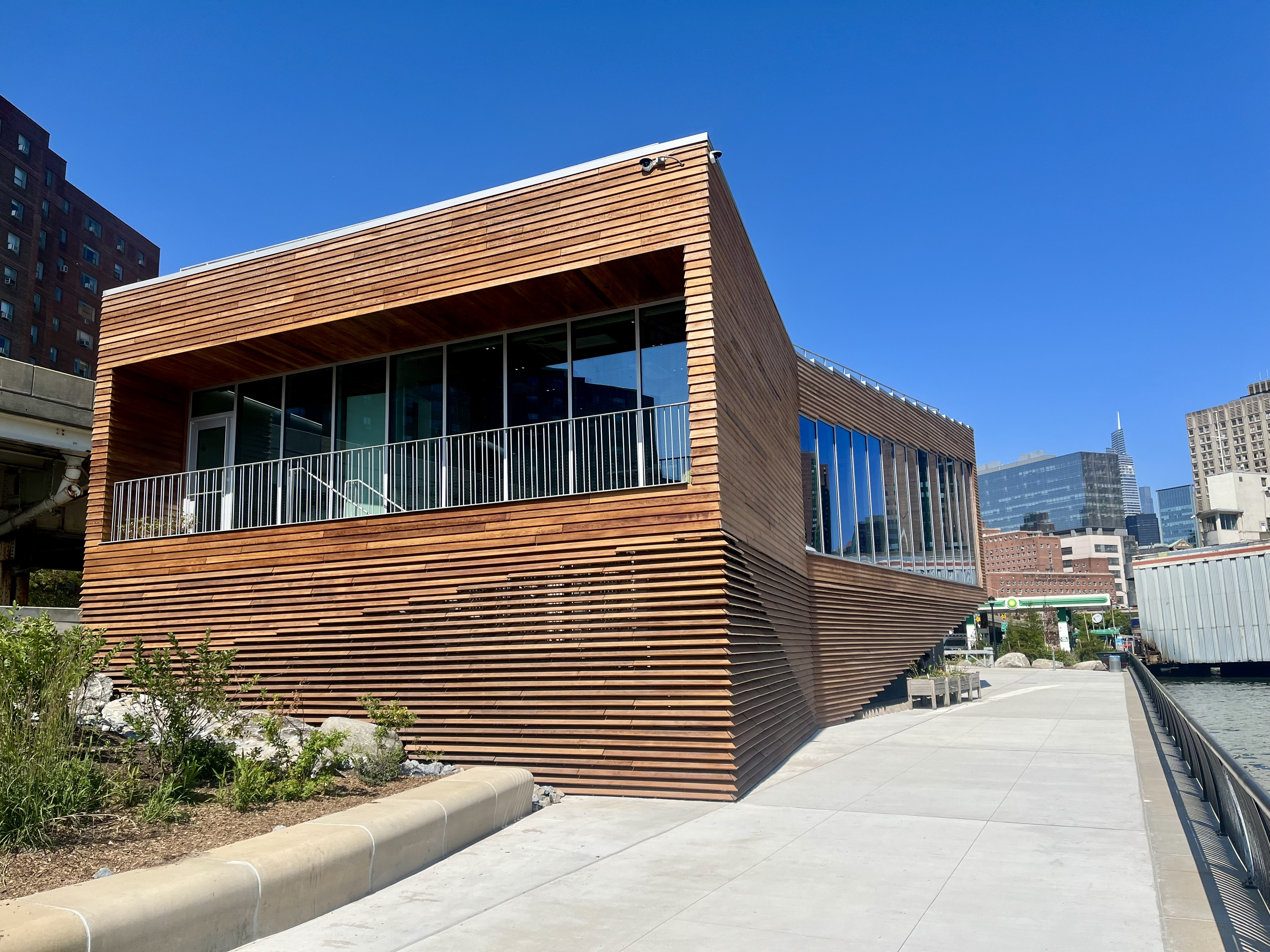
The Solar One building in 2025

A groundbreaking ceremony for the construction of a new two-story environmental education center at the north end of the park was held on September 13, 2023. The 6,500-square-foot (600 m^{2}) building was designed by Bjarke Ingels Group and will include flexible indoor space that can be used for classrooms or community functions as well as office facilities, storage areas, and a 25kW rooftop solar array with a battery energy storage system. The new building opened in September 2025.

== Native Plants of Stuyvesant Cove Park ==
As of 2016, these are the native plant species that vegetate at the park:

2016 Native Plants of Stuyvesant Cove Park
SYMBOL	Botanical Name	Common Name
ACRUR2	Actea racemosa	red baneberry
ACMI2	Achillea millefolium	common yarrow
AMCA4	Amelanchier canadensis	Canadian serviceberry
AMST80	Amelanchier stolonifera	running serviceberry
AMFR	Amorpha fruticosa	desert false indigo
AMTA2	Amsonia tabernaemontana	eastern bluestar
ANCA8	Anemone canadensis	Canadian anemone
ANTUT2	Anemone virginana	tuber anemone
AQCA	Aquilegia canadensis	red columbine
ARNU2	Aralia nudicaulis	wild sarsaparilla
AGAL5	Ageratina altissima	white snakeroot
ARUV	Arctostaphylos uva-ursi	kinnikinnick
ASIN	Asclepias incarnata	swamp milkweed
ASSY	Asclepias syriaca	common milkweed
ASTU	Asclepias tuberosa	butterfly milkweed
ASVE	Asclepias verticillata	whorled milkweed
BAHA	Baccharis halimifolia	eastern baccharis
BASE2	Baptesia tinctoria	serrate balsamroot
BEPO	Betula populifolia	gray birch
CARA2	Campsis radicans	trumpet creeper
CACA18	Carpinus caroliniana	American hornbeam
CAPE6	Carex pensylvanica	Pennsylvania sedge
CACA18	Carpinus caroliniana	American hornbeam
CEAM	Ceanothus americanus	New Jersey tea
CEOC	Celtis occidentalis	common hackberry
CHLA5	Chasmanthium latifolium	Indian woodoats
CHVI3	Chionanthus virginicus	white fringetree
CLVI5	Clematis virginiana	devil's darning needles
CLVI5	Clematis virginiana	devil's darning needles
CLAL3	Clethra alnifolia	coastal sweetpepperbush
COPE80	Comptonia peregrina	sweet fern
COCO13	Conoclinium coelestinum	blue mistflower
CORA6	Cornus racemosa	gray dogwood
COLA5	Coreopsis lanceolata	lanceleaf tickseed
COVE5	Coreopsis verticillata	whorled tickseed
CORO	Coreopsis rosea	pink tickseed
COWR3	Coreopsis zagreb	rock tickseed
DEPU2	dennstaedtia punctilobula	eastern hayscented fern
DICU	Dicentra cucullaria	Dutchman's breeches
DILO	Diervilla lonicera	northern bush honeysuckle
DIVI5	Diospyros virginiana	common persimmon
ECPU	Echinacea purpurea	eastern purple coneflower
ELHY	Elymus hystrix	eastern bottlebrush grass
ERSP	Eragrostis spectabilis	purple lovegrass
ERYU	Eryngium yuccifolium	button eryngo
ERAM5	Erythronium americanum	dogtooth violet
EUDI16	Eurybia divaricata	white wood aster
EUGR5	Euthamia graminifolia	flat-top goldentop
EUPU21	Eutrochium purpureum	sweetscented joe pye weed
FAGR	Fagus grandifolia	American beech
GEMA	Geranium maculatum	spotted geranium
GEMA4	Geum macrophyllum	largeleaf avens
GITR6	Gillenia trifoliata	Bowman's root
GRRU	Grass? (bed	San Francisco River leatherpetal
HAVE2	Hamamelis vernalis	Ozark witchhazel
HAVI4	Hamamelis virginiana	American witchhazel
HEAU	Helenium autumnale	common sneezeweed
HEHE5	Heliopsis helianthoides	smooth oxeye
HENO2	Hepatica nobilis	hepatica
HEVI2	Heuchera villosa	hairy alumroot
HIMO	Hibiscus moscheutos	crimsoneyed rosemallow
ILGL	Ilex glabra	inkberry
IRVE2	Iris versicolor	harlequin blueflag
LISC2	Liatris scariosa	devil's bite
JUVI	Juniperus virginiana	eastern redcedar
LOSE	Lonicera sempervirens	trumpet honeysuckle
LIAS	Liatris aspera	tall blazing star
LISP	Liatris spicata	dense blazing star
LISU	Lilium superbum	Turk's-cap lily
LOSI	Lobelia siphilitica	great blue lobelia
MEVI3	Mertensia virginica	Virginia bluebells
MODI	Monarda didyma	scarlet beebalm
MOFI	Monarda fistulosa	wild bergamot
MOPU	Monarda punctata	spotted beebalm
MOUT	Morus alba	Utah mortonia
MORU2	Morus rubra	red mulberry
MUCA2	Muhlenbergia capillaris	hairawn muhly
MYHA	Myrica pensylvanica	Sierra bayberry
OEFR	Oenothera fruticosa	narrowleaf evening primrose
OSCI	Osmunda cinnamomea	cinnamon fern
PAAM2	Panicum amarum	bitter panicgrass
PAQU2	Parthenocissus quinquefolia	Virginia creeper
PECA6	Penstemon calycosa	California penstemon
PEDI	Penstemon digitalis	talus slope penstemon
PHPA9	Phlox paniculata	fall phlox
PHST3	Phlox stolonifera	creeping phlox
PHVI7	Physocarpos opulifolius	roundtip twinpod
PHVI8	Physostegia virginiana	obedient plant
PIVI2	Pinus virginiana	Virginia pine
PORE2	Polemonium reptans	Greek valerian
PRMA2	Prunus maritima	beach plum
PRPE2	Prunus pensylvanica	pin cherry
PRSE2	Prunus serotina	black cherry
PYMU	Pycnanthemum muticum	clustered mountainmint
PYTE	Pycnanthemum tenuifolium	narrowleaf mountainmint
QUAL	Quercus alba	white oak
QUBI	Quercus bicolor	swamp white oak
QUCO2	Quercus coccinea	scarlet oak
QUIL	Quercus ilicifolia	bear oak
QUMA2	Quercus macrocarpa	bur oak
RHAR4	Rhus aromatica	fragrant sumac
RHGL	Rhus glabra	smooth sumac
ROCA4	Rosa Carolina	Carolina rose
RUAL	Rubus allegheniensis	Allegheny blackberry
RUTRT	Rudbekia fulgida	browneyed Susan
SAAN	Sabatia angularis	rosepink
SCMA2	Scrophularia marilandica-	carpenter's square
SIVI4	Silene virginica	fire pink
SOCA4	Solidago caesia	wreath goldenrod
SOGR4	Solidago graminifolia	Virginia goldenrod
SOSE	Solidago sempervirens	seaside goldenrod
SOST	Solidago stricta-	wand goldenrod
SPPA	Spartina patens	saltmeadow cordgrass
SPHE	Sporobolus heterolepis	prairie dropseed
SYOR	Symphoricarpos orbiculatus	coralberry
SYLA3	Symphyotrichum laeve	smooth blue aster
SYNO2	Symphyotrichum novea-angliae	New England aster
SYOB	Symphyotrichum oblongifolium	aromatic aster
THPU2	Thalictrum pubescens	king of the meadow
ULRU	Ulmus rubra	slippery elm
VEHA2	Verbena hastata	swamp verbena
VENO	Vernonia noveboracensis	New York ironweed
VIPR	Viburnum prunifolium	blackhaw
VILA10	Viola labradorica	alpine violet
VISO	Viola sororia	common blue violet
XASI	Xanthorhiza simplicissima	yellowroot
ZIAP	Zizia aptera	meadow zizia
ZIAU	Zizia aurea	golden zizia
