= New York City Waterfalls =

Public art in New York City

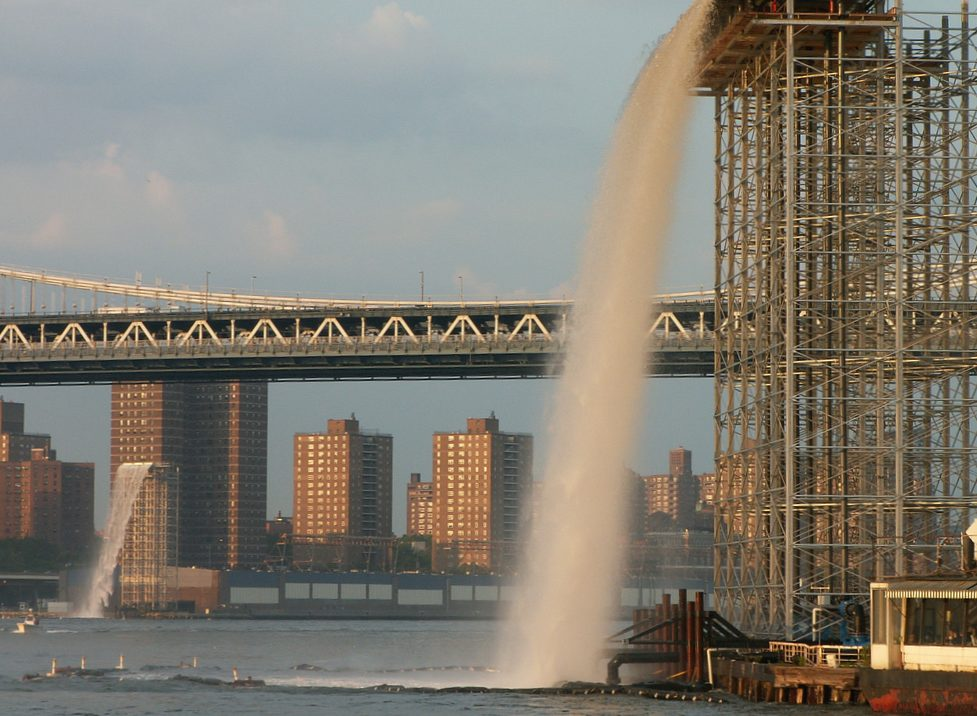
Waterfall under the Brooklyn Bridge. The bridge in the background is the Manhattan Bridge.

New York City Waterfalls is a public art project by artist Olafur Eliasson, in collaboration with the Public Art Fund, consisting of four man-made waterfalls placed around New York City along the East River. The most famous was at the Brooklyn Bridge in lower Manhattan. At $15.5 million, it is the most expensive public arts project since Christo and Jeanne-Claude's installation of The Gates in Central Park. The waterfalls officially began flowing on June 26, 2008. They ran from 7 am to 10 pm (under illumination after sunset) until October 13, 2008. The project drew approximately 1.4 million visitors and generated an estimated $69 million in economic activity for the city, exceeding initial projections of $55 million.

== Background ==
=== Location and construction ===
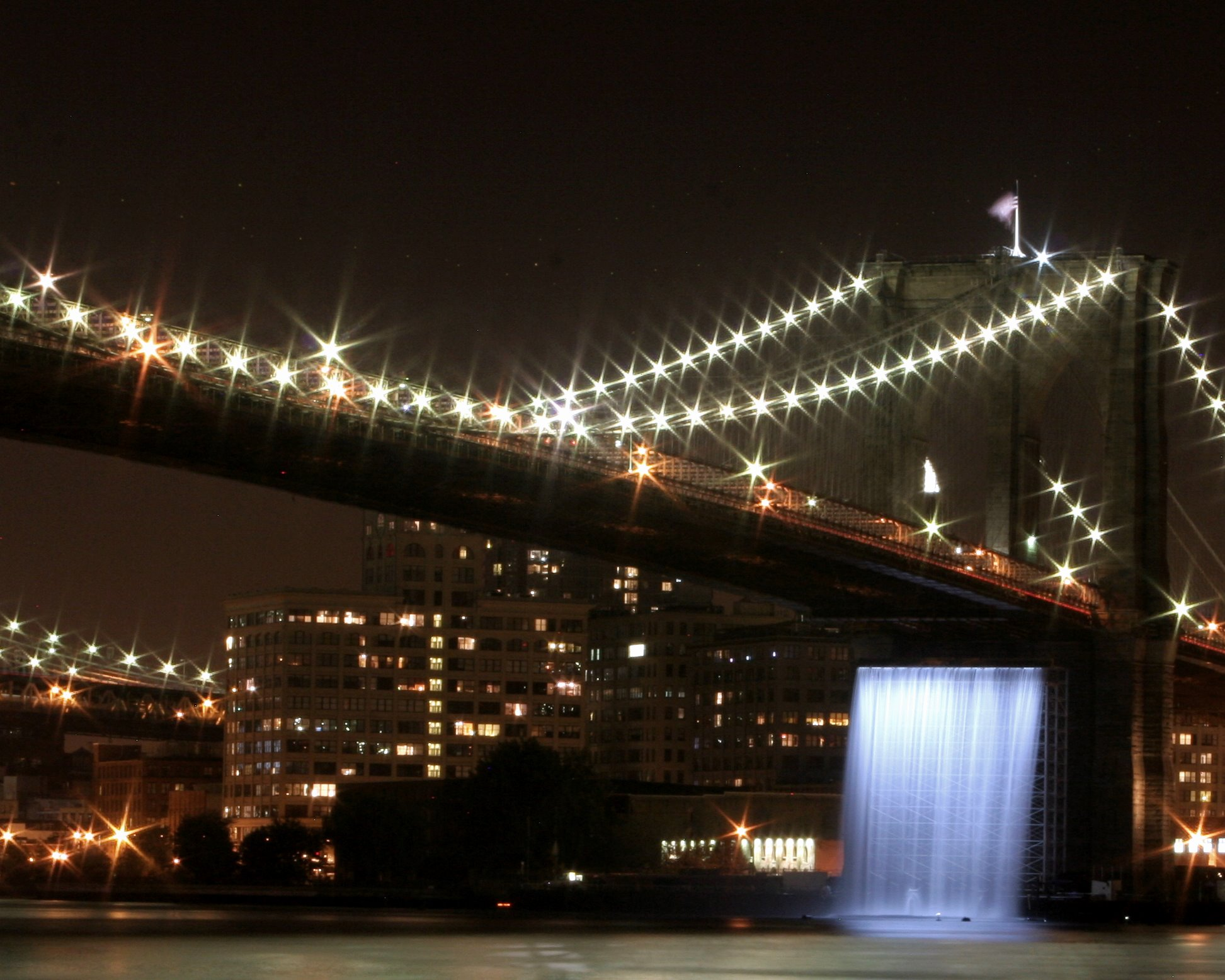
The Waterfall under the Brooklyn Bridge from the South Street Seaport

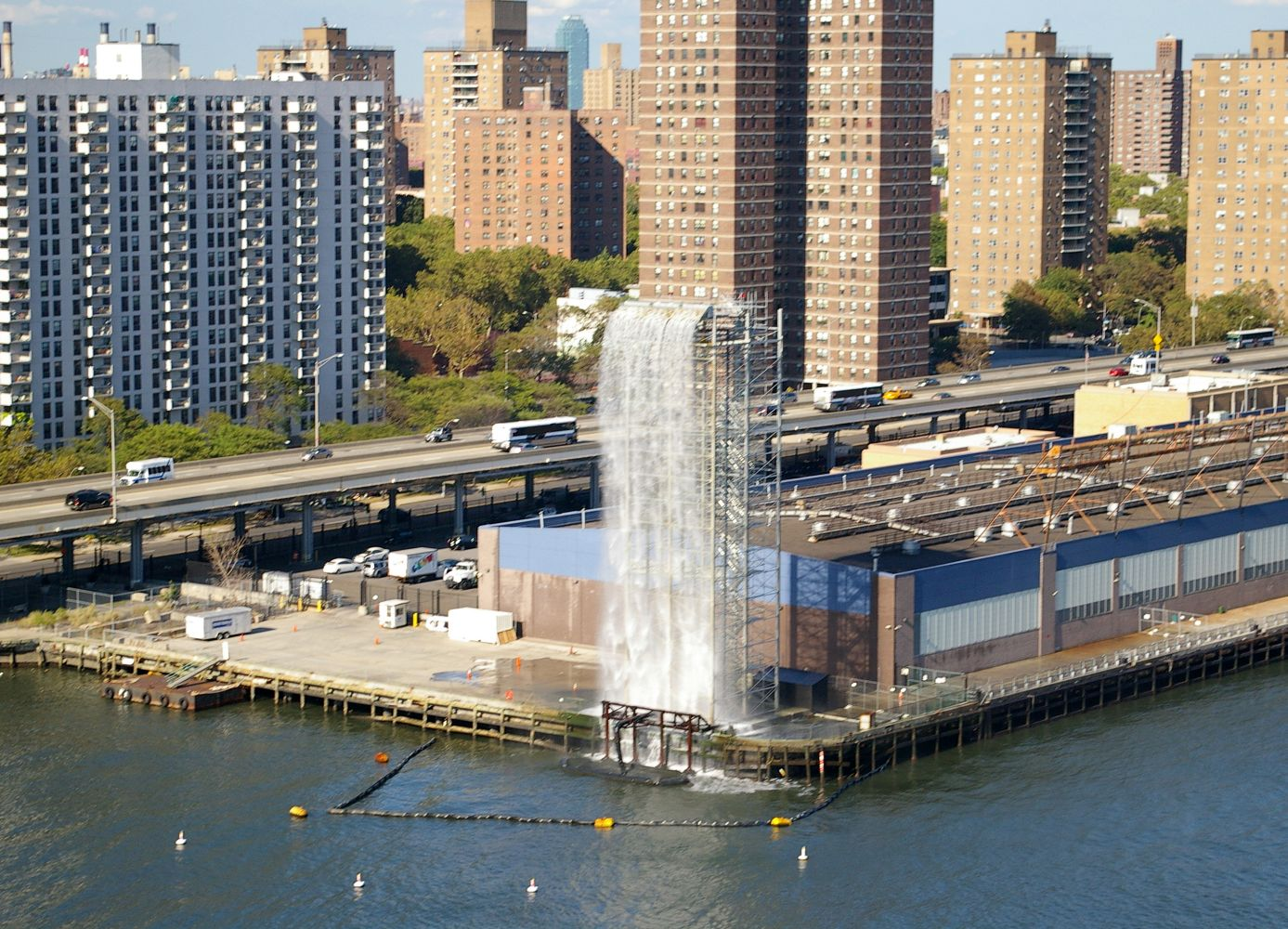
The Waterfall at Pier 35

The sites chosen for the four waterfalls were the East River Esplanade's Pier 35 in Manhattan; beneath the Brooklyn Bridge in DUMBO, between piers 4 and 5 near Brooklyn Heights Promenade; and Governors Island to activate spaces that typically were not.

Work on erecting the four support scaffolds began in mid-March, 2008. On the shore of Governors Island construction teams used pile driving to secure the scaffolding in place. This method was not used at the other locations for various reasons, including the effects of vibrations through car and subway tunnels. Once completed, the scaffolding would total 64,000 square feet (5,900 m^{2}) and weigh 270 tons. Eliasson has said that the scaffolds themselves were designed to blend in with their urban surroundings, but that he purposely did not try to conceal them, explaining he "want[s] people to know that this is both a natural phenomenon and a cultural one."

Construction involved the work of 108 different people, including two environmental consultants. The installation was designed to be ecologically-friendly. Some example of this are energy efficient LED lighting by US-based LED Lighting Designers & Manufacturers Boca Flasher, Inc., energy purchased from renewable sources and the filters used to keep aquatic life from taking a ride up-and-over the waterfall. When the project closed the materials were intended to be made available for re-use in a future project.

=== Costs ===
The over $15 million project had no city funding and was paid for entirely by private organizations, business and donors. Mayor Michael Bloomberg's company, Bloomberg LP, donated $13.5 million. With estimates that the waterfalls could generate up to $55 million for the local economies, the Lower Manhattan Development Corporation gave $2 million to the effort.

== Environmental impact ==
During the run, trees and shrubs along the Brooklyn Heights Promenade were damaged as a result of the saltwater blown into the parks during high winds. Several steps were taken to solve this problem which included cutting the running time to 50 hours a week instead of the original 101. At the Brooklyn Bridge, the owner of The River Café claimed customer loss and plant replacements as a result of the winds on the falls. The known damages were getting attention to the point that The Brooklyn Heights Association asked the committee to take down the falls after Labor Day, instead of the original date.

== Reception ==
Critical reaction to the project was largely positive. Writing in The New York Times, art critic Roberta Smith praised the installation, describing the four waterfall as evoking signs of a natural world largely paved over by the city and noting how they appeared miragelike when illuminated at night. In The Village Voice, Lynn Yaeger offered a more critical response arguing that Eliasson had persuaded the city to host a project that fell short of its ambitions. Public attendance exceeded expectations. According to a study by the New York City Economic Development Corporation, the installation drew approximately 1.4 million visitors and generated an estimated $69 million in direct and indirect economic activity for the city, surpassing the $55 million initially projected.
