= Solar 1 =

Coordinates: 40°44′05″N 73°58′28″W

- Type: Charity
- Founded: 2002
- Headquarters: Manhattan, New York City, United States
- Key people: Chris Collins, Executive Director
- Website: http://www.solar1.org

Solar 1 is New York City's only self-sustaining solar powered building. It houses educational facilities for Solar One, a non-profit organisation concerned with green energy, arts, and education. The Solar 1 building is located at the north end of Stuyvesant Cove Park, the city's only all-native plant park, which Solar 1 actively maintains. Situated on a brownfield site, Stuyvesant Cove Park offers opportunities for the local community to become involved in the park and learn about its special features. The Park has been designated a Wildlife Habitat by the National Wildlife Federation for providing a quality habitat by virtue of its standards of conscientious planning, landscaping and sustainable gardening. More than 250 volunteers and 80 student interns have spent more than 5,000 hours working in the park, planting, watering, and weeding the thousands of new plants that have been added over the years.

Solar 1 is a prototype for Solar 2, the first building in NYC to generate power in excess of what it uses, thereby putting more power into the grid than it takes out. It is a landmark and a model for future NYC buildings.

== History ==
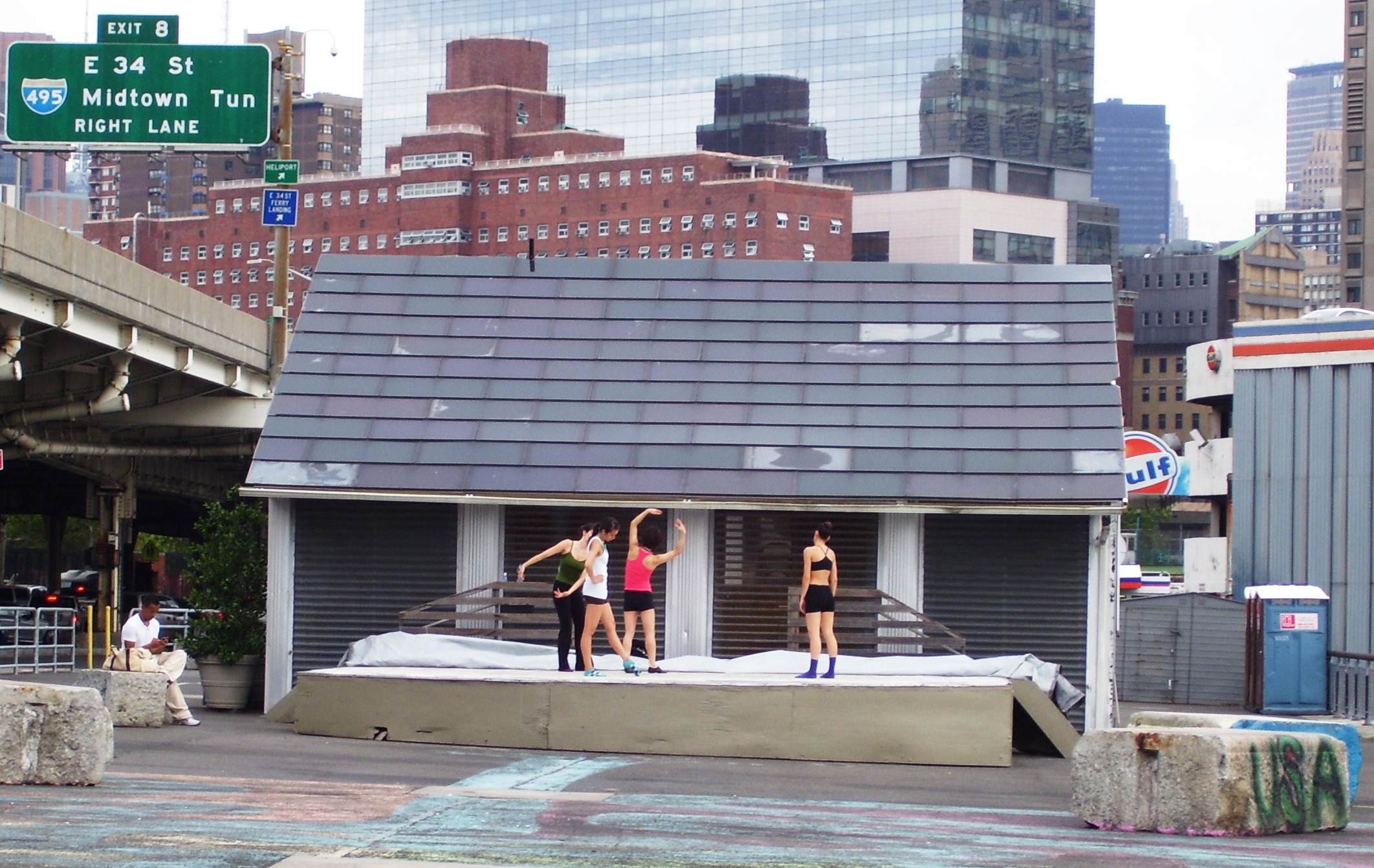
Solar 1 building in 2010

In 2001, the Community Environmental Center (CEC), a non-profit organisation, was designated by the New York City Economic Development Corporation (EDC) to develop and manage an environmental learning center in the recently constructed Stuyvesant Cove Park. Located along the East River between 18th and 23rd Streets in Manhattan on a brownfield site, the park opened to the public in January 2002. Under a 40-year lease with the EDC, CEC gained responsibility for the design and construction of Solar 2, educational programming, and park maintenance.

In May 2003, CEC opened Solar 1, a solar-powered building, where students and residents from the city and the greater Metro area learn first hand the principles about energy conservation in their urban neighbourhood. The Solar 2 Green Energy Arts and Education Center will be a new 8,000-square-foot (740 m^{2}) Platinum LEED certified "net-zero" building that will replace Solar 1 and will be the only one of its kind in New York City.

== Education ==
Solar One provides education initiatives to children in the five boroughs of New York through after-school and summer camp programs. The education initiatives focus on energy and design, educating future environmental city dwellers. The K-12 education programs are located at the Solar One education center. Program topics for the 1.5 hour classes include Renewable Energy, Sustainable Design and Estuary and Park Ecology. In addition to this, Solar One offers a longer-term education initiative called Green Design Lab. The Green Design Lab is a year-long curriculum guide for how to green a school. It provides hands-on learning opportunities that bring sustainability to life by using the school building as a teaching tool. It includes five units: Energy, Water, Air Quality, Materials and Food.

=== Energy Connections Program ===
Solar One Energy Connections (S1EC) connects New York City residents, businesses, and community-based organisations to energy efficiency and renewable energy resources through education, outreach, and project partnerships. Their mission is to make all New Yorkers part of our New York City's ambitious efforts to combat climate change and develop a clean, green economy.

=== Green Jobs Program ===
For several years, Solar One built programs with job training components. Beginning in 2009, they began to focus on developing a program focused solely on training people for jobs in the emerging green economy. Today, S1 runs a robust program with over a dozen workforce agency partners that covers many topics: Solar (PV) installation, energy efficiency and Weatherization, carpentry, plumbing and more. Workforce organisations that offer Green Training Programs includes: Strive, Vocational Foundation, Non-Traditional Employment for Women, Green City Force and Covenant House New York,

=== Green Arts ===
Solar One's Green Arts programming creates a new approach to learning about green energy and conservation. The Green Energy Arts Festival is an annual series of events that attract diverse audience members who might not otherwise attend a "green" event. Each year during the spring, summer and fall, S1 offers a variety of free, public programs and events, like the Solar-Powered Dance and Film Series, the Sun To Stars festival, Family Days, musical performances and more.

== Solar 2 ==
In 2012, S1 hopes to break ground on SOLAR 2, an 8,000 square foot 100% green-powered education and arts center that is slated to be New York's first Platinum LEED educational facility. SOLAR 2 was designed by the renowned green architecture firm Kiss & Cathcart, and engineered by the firm of Arup.

In November 2023, S2 begun construction in Stuyvesant Cove Park. The project officially opened it's doors in September 2025.

== Emissions data ==
Carbon Emission Reductions Achieved by Solar One for the Solar 1 Building:

- Monthly usage (kWh): 400
- Yearly savings (kWh displaced from grid): 3,600
- Yearly CO_{2} emissions saved (lbs.): 3.254
