= 400 First Avenue =

Building in Manhattan, New York

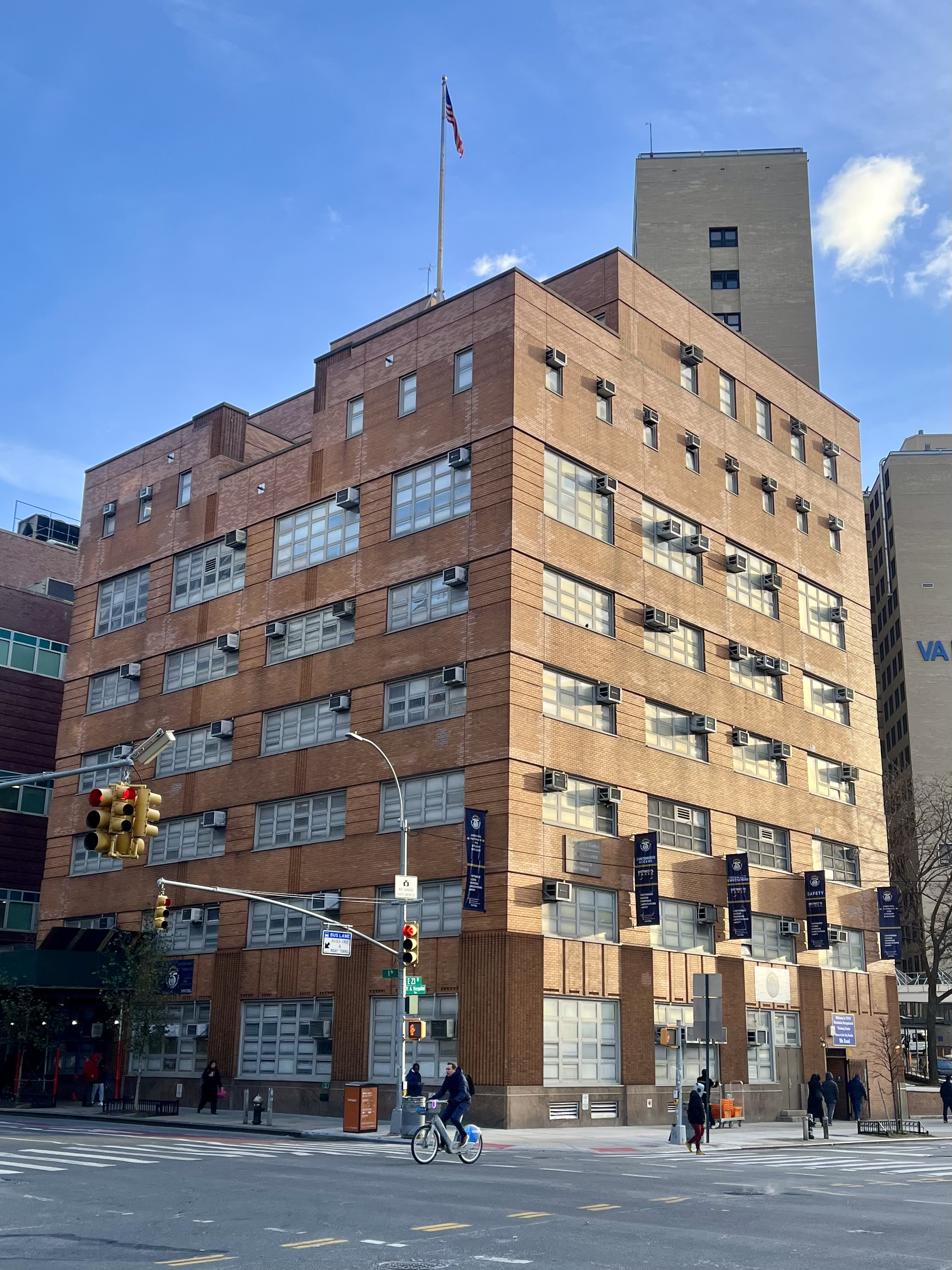
- The building in 2025
- Interactive map of the 400 First Avenue area

General information
- Architectural style: Art Deco-Art Moderne
- Location: 400 First Avenue; Manhattan, New York City, US
- Coordinates: 40°44′13″N 73°58′41″W
- Year built: 1930–1931
- Renovated: 1952–1954, 1973
- Owner: City of New York

Technical details
- Floor count: 8

Design and construction
- Architecture firm: Voorhees, Gmelin and Walker
- Developer: Institute for the Crippled and Disabled
- Main contractor: Cauldwell-Wingate Co.

400 First Avenue is an eight-story building located at the northeast corner of First Avenue and East 23rd Street in the Kips Bay neighborhood of Manhattan in New York City, United States. Designed by the architectural firm of Voorhees, Gmelin and Walker, the building opened in 1931 as the new home of the Institute for the Crippled and Disabled through a gift from Jeremiah Milbank. 400 First Avenue was sold to the City of New York in 1973 to serve as an expansion for Junior High School 47. As of 2025, the building is still owned by the city and accommodates a public school and administrative offices for a school district.

== History ==
In June 1930, philanthropist Jeremiah Milbank offered to contribute one million dollars for the construction of a new building for the Institute for the Crippled and Disabled (ICD), which was outgrowing its existing facilities at the northwest corner of Second Avenue and East 23rd Street in Manhattan. Milbank had been providing funds to ICD since World War I, when he helped the American Red Cross in founding the "Institute for Crippled and Disabled Men" to provide assistance to disabled servicemen with job training and placement as they returned to civilian life. In 1928, the organization changed its name to the "Institute for the Crippled and Disabled" when its mission was expanded to provide assistance to disabled women.

Milbank had been making plans for a new building for ICD on a lot he controlled at the northeast corner of First Avenue and East 23rd Street, located one block to the east of its current quarters—forming a building committee and engaging the architectural firm of Voorhees, Gmelin and Walker to prepare preliminary plans and estimates—before the matter was brought before ICD's board of trustees in June 1930. The land lot had frontages of 98 feet 9 inches (30.1 m) and 81 feet 6 inches (24.8 m) on First Avenue and East 23rd Street, respectively.

The public announcement of Milbank's gift was delayed until April 15, 1931, when ICD's annual commencement exercises were held in the auditorium of Public School 47. That year, the commencement speech was made by Dr. Ray Lyman Wilbur, the United States Secretary of Interior, who applauded ICD's 34 graduates and said "you have learned to work instead of whine." By then, construction of the new building had already been started. In July 1930, ICD had entered into an agreement with the Cauldwell-Wingate Company to serve as the general contractor. Concrete work had reached the third story by December 1930, and practically all of the structural work was completed by the following month. The total cost of the project, including property acquisition, construction and furnishings, came to about $800,000.

The new building contained a welding shop in the basement, an employment center and an artificial limb shop with fitting rooms on the first floor, a sheltered workroom on the second floor, a print shop on the third floor, instructional space for classes in case making, drafting, jewelry making and optical mechanics on the fourth floor, administrative offices on the fifth floor, a multi-purpose room that could be used as an auditorium, cafeteria, lounge, or recreational area on the sixth floor, a 24-room dormitory on the seventh floor, and two solaria with open terraces on the top floor. Two elevators were included to provide accessibility to all levels. The unique combination of uses in the new facility made it difficult to classify under the city's building code and it was ultimately accepted as a hospital by the State Board of Social Welfare. While the seventh floor was classified as a "hospital" on the building's certificate of occupancy, the rooms on the dormitory floor were intended to serve as low-cost living accommodations for out-of-town cripples so they could also benefit from the services provided by ICD.

Plans to add an occupational therapy center and treatment rooms to the building were later filed in 1952 by Voorhees, Walker, Foley & Smith; the renovations were completed in 1954, which converted the third and fourth floors into the occupational therapy center, the seventh floor into offices and the eighth floor into offices and classrooms. During the late 1950s and early 1960s, ICD began acquiring parcels of land on East 24th Street between First and Second avenues and planned to use the assembled properties to construct a new six-story building to supplement its facility at 400 First Avenue. ICD's Research and Vocational Training Building at 340 East 24th Street opened in 1962; ICD later partnered with New York University Medical Center to open a medical research facility at the site called ICD Research Laboratories.

In the early 1970s, ICD changed its name from the "Institute for the Crippled and Disabled" to the "International Center for the Disabled". During this same time period, ICD explored potential options for its property at 400 First Avenue, including a long-term lease of the site to the Veterans Health Administration and a sale of the site to the City of New York for use by the School for the Deaf. (Note: The buildings adjacent to 400 First Avenue were cleared in the early 1950s to make way for the New York Veterans Administration Hospital, which opened in 1954 and occupied the remainder of the site between First Avenue and Avenue A from East 23rd to East 25th streets.) (Note: The School for the Deaf, also known as Junior High School 47, was located on East 23rd Street between Second and Third avenues.) In 1973, the city purchased 400 First Avenue from ICD for $2.5 million, which it planned to use as an expansion for Junior High School 47. Meanwhile, ICD consolidated its operations into its other building located at 340 East 24th Street, which had been recently renovated.

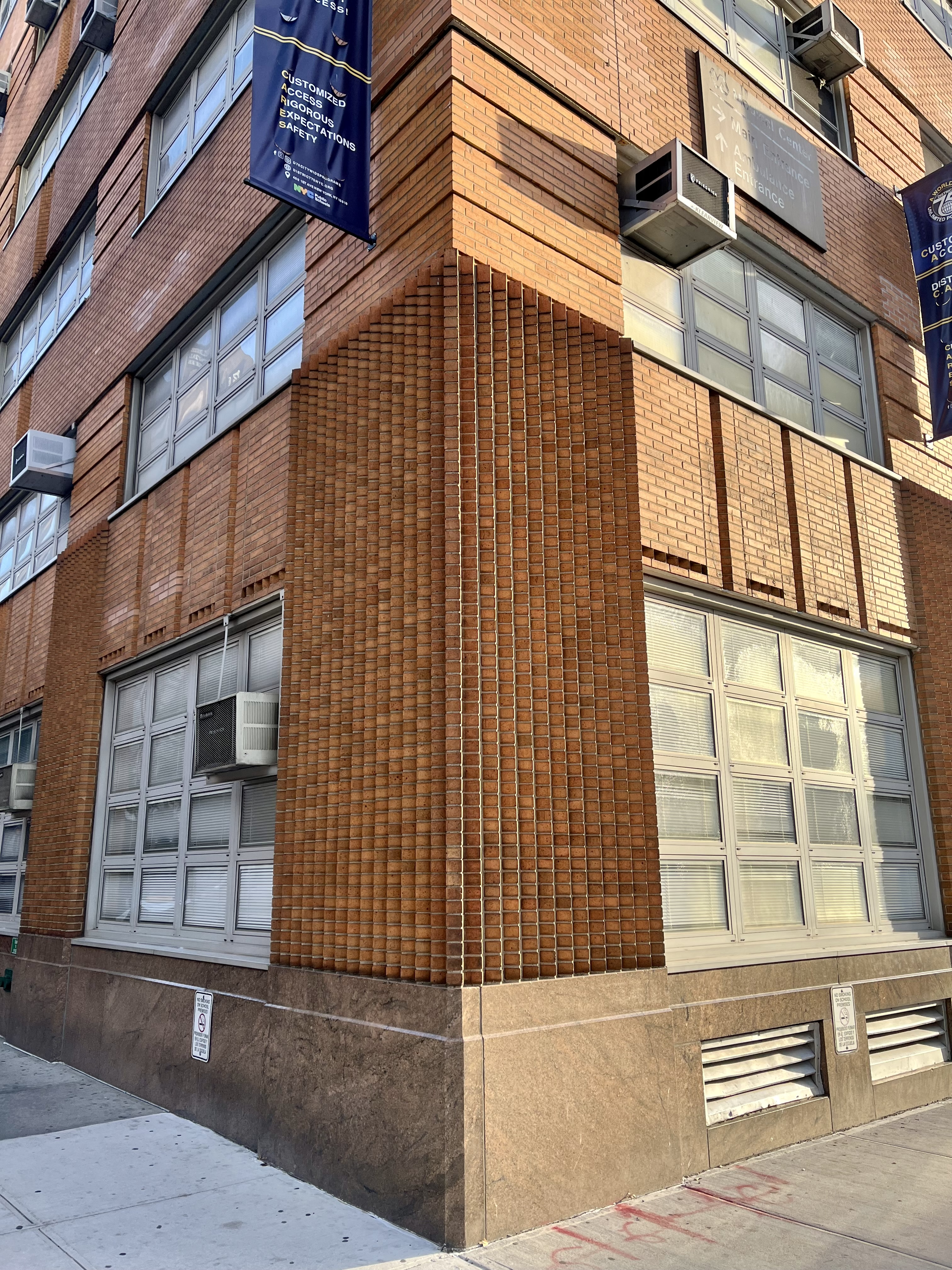
Detail of facade, showing diagonally-laid bricks that resemble a fluted column

In 2025, the Historic Districts Council, in partnership with the Rose Hill/Kips Bay Coalition, requested the New York City Landmarks Preservation Commission evaluate 400 First Avenue for potential designation as an individual landmark. As of 2025, the building is still owned by the city; it is used as administrative offices for District 75, a school district within the New York City Department of Education that provides specialized instructional support for children with challenges such as autism, cognitive delay, disabilities and sensory impairments, and is also one of the sites used by Public School 721M, the Manhattan Occupational Training Center.

== Architecture ==
The building was designed in the Art Deco-Art Moderne style by the firm of Voorhees, Gmelin and Walker. The exterior is clad in various shades of salmon pink-colored brick and is decorated by different patterns of brickwork including diagonally-laid bricks between the first and second floors that resemble fluted columns, horizontal bands and recessed bricks. A course of polished granite runs along the base of the building. The facades facing the streets are divided into four bays containing horizontal steel sash windows. Setbacks begin at the seventh floor.

In December 1931, Lewis Mumford wrote favorably about the design of ICD's new home in The New Yorker, calling it a "plain, simple, elegant, workmanlike building, with its generous window spaces and its fine command of standard materials and units" and "a sincere and straightforward achievement," preferring it over the design for the Irving Trust Company Building by Ralph Thomas Walker of Voorhees, Gmelin and Walker. In a 2010 article discussing the stretch of hospitals along First Avenue north of East 23rd Street, Christopher Gray of The New York Times described 400 First Avenue as "a nice little find, with sawtooth brickwork, oddball brick coursing and a rich, figured marble lobby."

== See also ==
- Art Deco architecture of New York City
