= 217 East 28th Street =

Building in Manhattan, New York

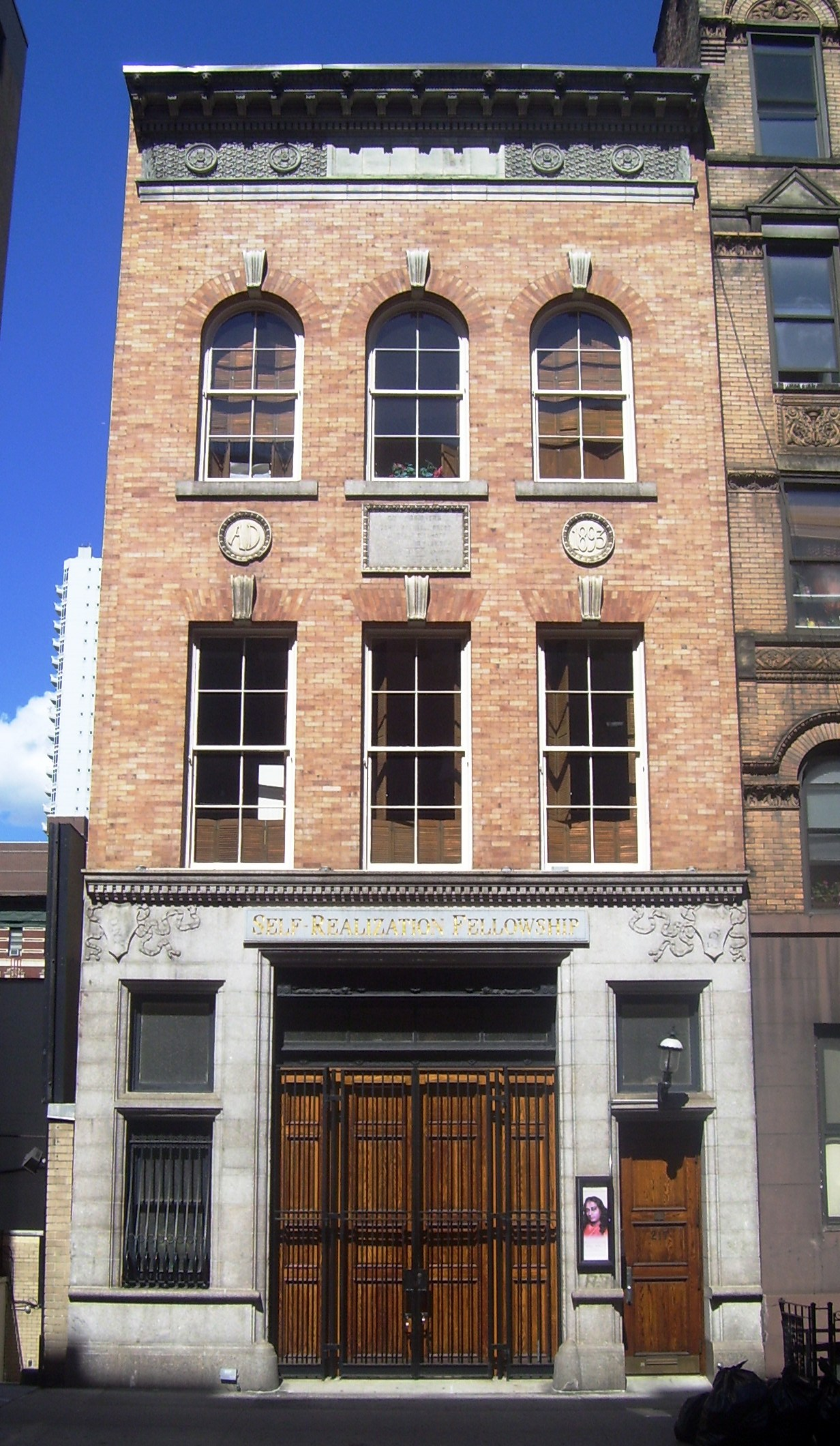
- The building in 2012
- Former names: Hook & Ladder 7

General information
- Location: 217 East 28th Street; Manhattan, New York, US
- Coordinates: 40°44′30″N 73°58′48″W
- Year built: 1893
- Renovated: 1903–1904, c. 1969, c. 1993

Design and construction
- Architecture firm: Napoleon LeBrun & Sons

217 East 28th Street is a building located between Second and Third avenues in the Kips Bay neighborhood of Manhattan in New York City. Designed by the architecture firm of Napoleon LeBrun & Sons, the structure was constructed in 1893 as a fire house for Hook & Ladder Company No. 7 of the New York City Fire Department. Following the decommissioning of the fire house in the late 1960s, the building was sold by the city at an auction and converted into a photo studio and residence. After subsequently being used as offices, the property was purchased in 1993 by the Self-Realization Fellowship to serve as the New York City Center of the religious organization.

== History ==
The building was originally constructed as a fire house for Hook and Ladder Company No. 7 of the New York City Fire Department. The land lot, which has a frontage of 23 feet 4 inches (7.1 m) and a depth of 98 feet 8 inches (30.1 m), had been acquired by the city on March 14, 1850. In 1893, Napoleon LeBrun & Sons prepared plans for a three-story brick and stone structure on the site to serve as a replacement to the existing fire house. A stable located at 140 East 32nd Street was leased from Solomon Loeb and used as temporary quarters by the hook and ladder company during construction of the new fire house. On October 12, 1903, a contract for alterations to the building was awarded to George Hildebrand; this work was completed on May 12, 1904. Ladder Company 7 was located at the site until the late 1960s, when it moved to a new building at 234 East 29th Street along with Engine Company 16.

On March 18, 1969, the city held an auction to sell the building at the Roosevelt Hotel, with the initial bid set at $42,500. It was purchased by fashion photographer Otto Storch for $153,000. Storch supervised the conversion of the former fire house into a combination of a photo studio and residence, which added a penthouse suite above the third floor of the original structure; the photo studio occupied the first and second floors while the third floor and penthouse served as the living quarters. The renovation included new plumbing, heating and electrical wiring systems but salvaged a number of components from the fire house and incorporated them into the redesigned space, including the brass fireman's pole, flooring, front doors, tile walls, tin ceilings, skylights, window walls and an iron spiral staircase. An elevator was added to serve the cellar through third floor; the spiral staircase on the ground floor was relocated to run between the residential space on the third floor and penthouse to comply with the local fire code.

A group of graphic designers—including Herb Lubalin and Alan Peckolick—purchased the property in 1978 and moved their studio into the building. Their graphic design firm was renamed from Herb Lubalin Associates to Lubalin, Peckolick Associates in 1980.

In 1993, the property was sold to the Self-Realization Fellowship, a religious organization founded by Paramahansa Yogananda, author of Autobiography of a Yogi. The building was renovated and converted into the New York City Center of Self-Realization Fellowship. It contains two chapels, Sunday school rooms, a bookshop, a family room and office space. The building is used for weekly meditation and devotional services. Before purchasing its own building, the New York City Center of Self-Realization Fellowship had previously conducted services at a variety of locations, including the Unitarian Church, the Hotel Wellington and the Fisk Building.

== See also ==
- 223 East 25th Street – the former fire house of Engine Company 16 in Kips Bay, also designed by Napoleon LeBrun & Sons
