= 223 East 25th Street =

Residential building in Manhattan, New York

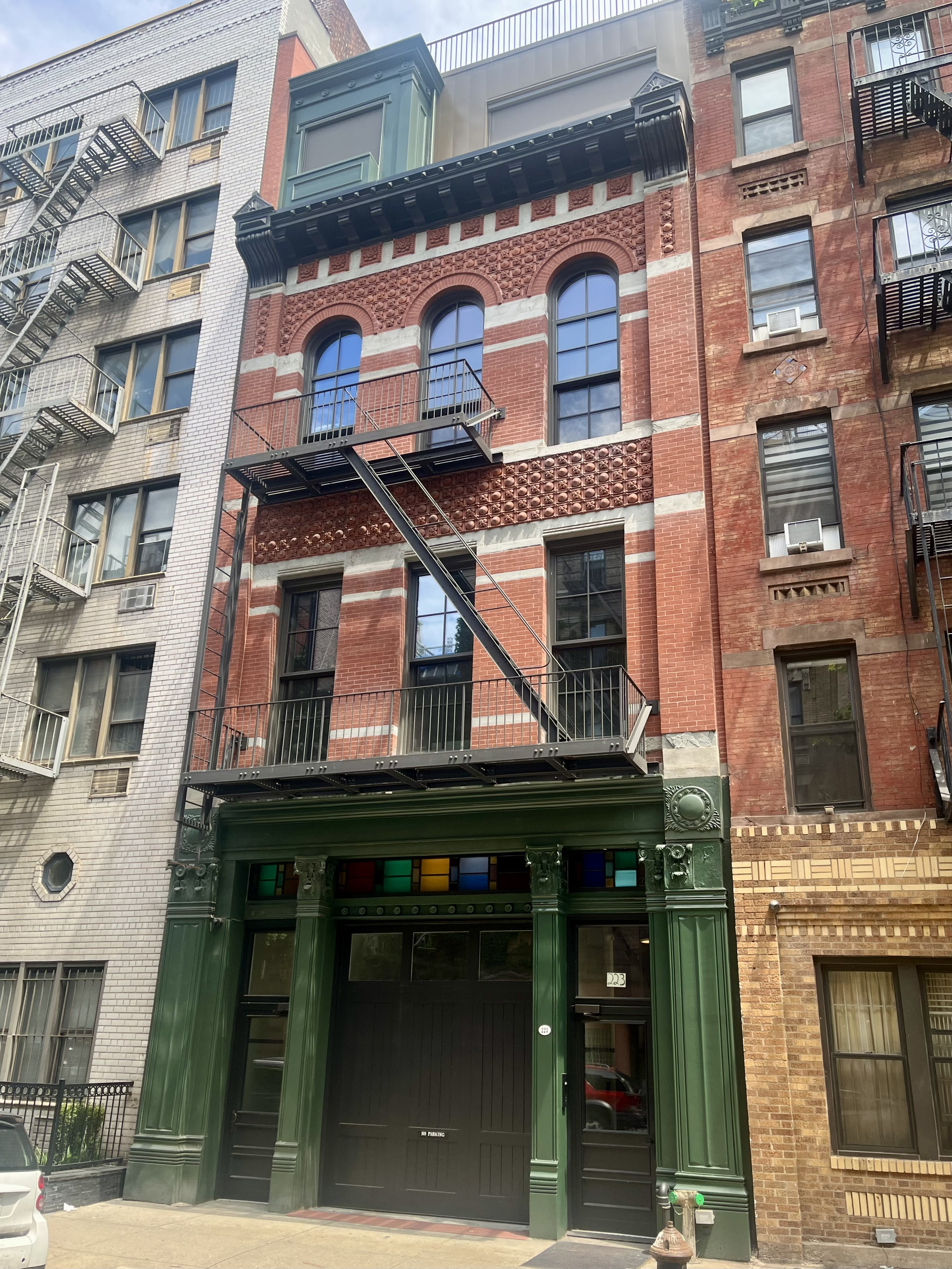
- The building in 2025
- Interactive map of the 223 East 25th Street area
- Former names: Engine 16; Ninth Church of Christ, Scientist

General information
- Architectural style: Victorian Gothic
- Location: 223 East 25th Street; Manhattan, New York, US
- Coordinates: 40°44′23″N 73°58′52″W
- Year built: 1882–1883
- Renovated: 1906, 1974, 2021–2022

Technical details
- Floor count: 5
- Floor area: 13,134 sq ft (1,220 m^{2})

Design and construction
- Architecture firm: Napoleon LeBrun & Sons

Renovating team
- Renovating firm: Baxt Ingui Architects

223 East 25th Street is a residential building located between Second and Third avenues in the Kips Bay neighborhood of Manhattan in New York City. Designed by the architecture firm of Napoleon LeBrun & Sons, the building was completed in 1883 as a fire house for Engine Company 16 of the New York City Fire Department. The fire house was decommissioned in the late 1960s and the building was later sold by the city at an auction to the Ninth Church of Christ, Scientist. After being used as a church, the property was purchased by a developer in 2018 and converted into a multi-family residential building, obtaining Passive House certification.

== History ==
The building was originally constructed as a fire house used by Engine 16 of the New York City Fire Department. Metropolitan Steam Fire Engine Company No. 16 had been established at the site in 1865, taking over the fire house formerly occupied by Engine Company No. 7. On August 1, 1882, Napoleon LeBrun & Sons filed plans for a new three-story fire house on the site to serve as a replacement to the existing fire house. The design of the building was nearly the same as another fire house designed by Napoleon LeBrun & Sons at 209 Elizabeth Street and similar to other fire houses that the firm designed at 269 Henry Street and 304 West 47th Street. The land lot has a frontage of 25 feet (7.6 m) and a depth of 98 feet (30 m). Construction of the fire house commenced in November 1882 and was completed in April 1883. In 1906, the building was renovated with the addition of new reinforced concrete floors and iron staircases by the Schaefer-Carroll Construction Company.

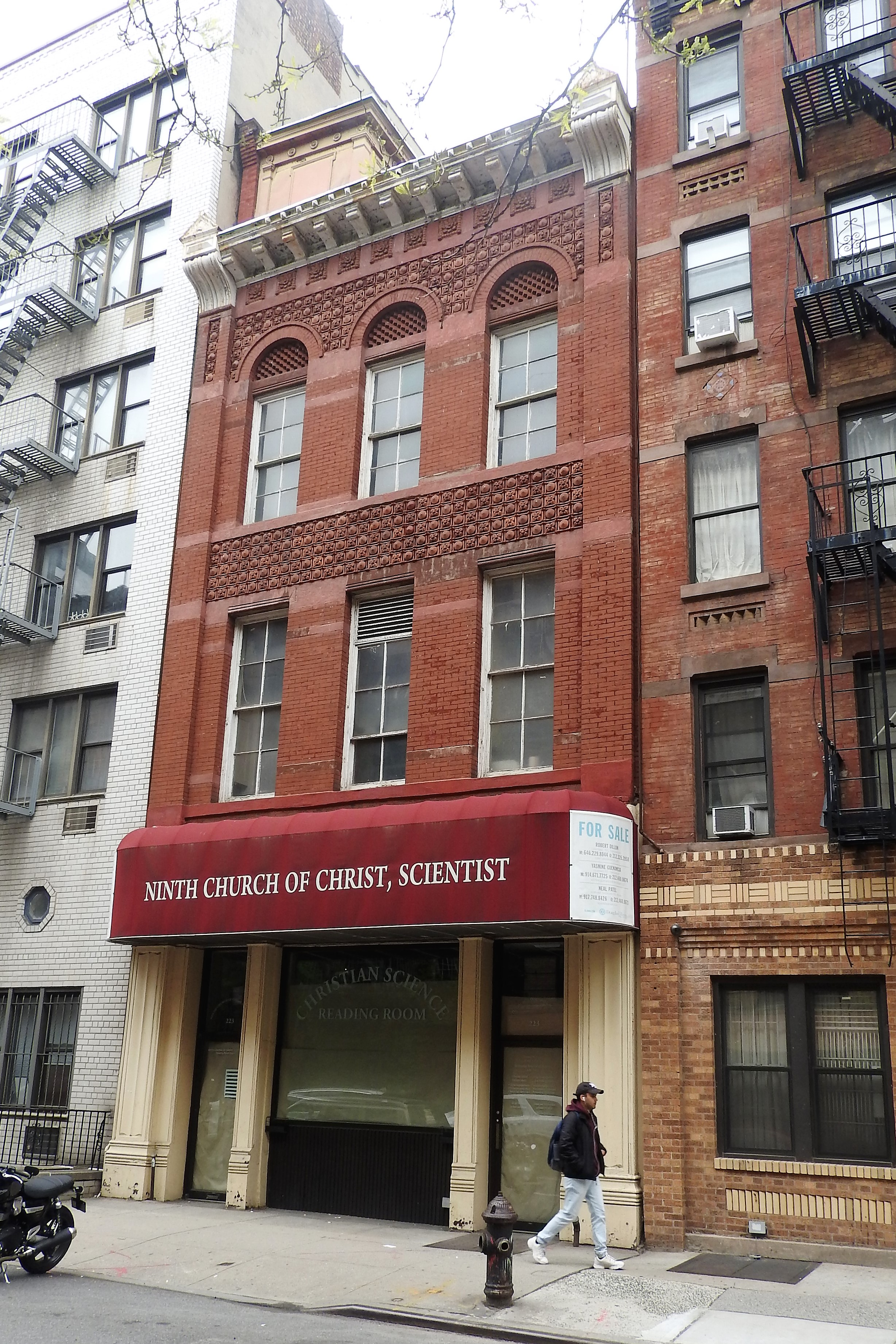
The building in 2019, prior to its residential conversion

Engine Company 16 was located at the site until the late 1960s, when it moved to a new building at 234 East 29th Street along with Ladder Company 7. The former fire house was then rented out to a photographer. On June 19, 1973, the city held an auction to sell the building at the Roosevelt Hotel, with the initial bid set at $24,000. A bidding war drove up the price of the property, which had been inspected by more than 1,000 people in the prior month. The building ended up selling for $217,000 to a woman representing the Ninth Church of Christ, Scientist. The church, a congregation of the Church of Christ, Scientist, had been previously meeting at the Gramercy Park Hotel. It desired the building due to its convenient location and because it could be easily converted. The conversion of the ground floor of the building into a church was completed in 1974.

In February 2018, the Ninth Church of Christ, Scientist sold the building to 223 East 25th Street, LLC for $6 million. Plans were approved in July 2019 for a residential conversion, adding two floors to create a multi-family building containing four apartments and ground-floor medical office space, while preserving the building's original façade. Renovations to the building began in January 2021 and were completed in July 2022; the gut rehabilitation resulted in a 13,134-square-foot (1,220 m^{2}) building that obtained Passive House certification from the Passive House Institute.

The renovation project was selected in October 2019 as a winner of the Buildings of Excellence competition sponsored by the New York State Energy Research and Development Authority (NYSERDA). Launched in 2019, the competition was established to increase the number of low-carbon buildings in New York State by recognizing widely adoptable projects that can achieve low-carbon performance and also provide financial benefits for owners. Engine 16 was a round one demonstration project winner in the late design phase category. Funding for the third round of NYSERDA's Buildings of Excellence competition was announced at an event held at the former Engine 16 building on April 7, 2022.

== Architecture ==
Similar to other fire houses designed by Napoleon LeBrun & Sons, the building is divided into three bays of doorways at ground level (including a single entrance for vehicles) and included a cast iron shed for drying hoses on the roof. On the ground floor, the cast iron façade has ornamentation that includes Corinthian pilasters and linenfold; on the upper floors, the brick façade is Victorian Gothic in style and has horizontal bands of granite belt course and elaborate terra cotta decorations, including diaper work between the second and third floors, above the third floor, and in the frieze. The second and third floors each have three windows flanked by brick pilasters on the sides of the building; brick arches are located above the third-floor windows. The top of the façade has a tin cornice with projecting modillions; the finials of the pilasters include a large scroll bracket topped with a sun burst decoration and a gable roof.

The residential conversion added two new floors to the building. The third floor of the original building was converted into two floors (now the third and fourth floors) and the fifth floor was added onto the roof of the original building. Of the four apartments, two are located on the second floor and include loft space, a duplex spans the third and fourth floors, and a triplex spans the third to fifth floors and includes interior floor openings to draw daylight from the skylights to the lower floors of the unit. The medical office space is located on the ground floor and in the cellar. As part of the renovation process, a number of components salvaged from the fire house were incorporated into the redesigned space, including cast iron and wooden railings, coat hooks, flooring material, interior windows and tin ceilings.

== See also ==
- 217 East 28th Street – the former fire house of Ladder Company 7 in Kips Bay, also designed by Napoleon LeBrun & Sons
