= 203 East 29th Street =

Historic house in Manhattan, New York

- House at 203 East 29 Street
- U.S. National Register of Historic Places
- New York State Register of Historic Places
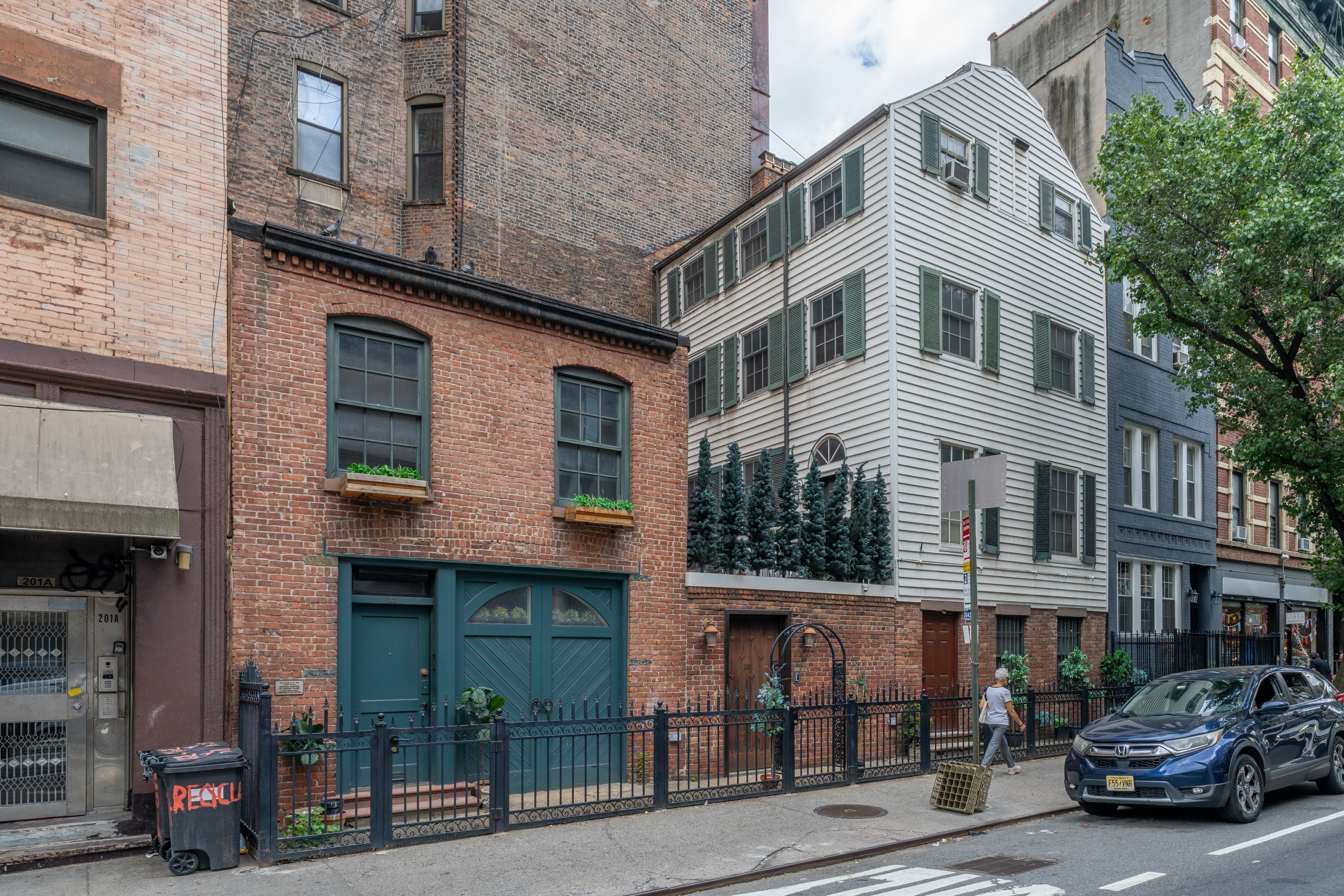
- (2026)

- Location within New York City Location within New York Location within the United States
- Location: 203 East 29th Street, New York, New York
- Coordinates: 40°44′33″N 73°58′48″W
- Built: 1790
- NRHP reference No.: 82003377
- NYSRHP No.: 06101.000651

Significant dates
- Added to NRHP: July 8, 1982
- Designated NYSRHP: June 1, 1982

203 East 29th Street is a historic house and carriage house located between Second and Third Avenues in Kips Bay, Manhattan, New York City, and one of the few remaining wooden houses on Manhattan Island. The year the house was built is uncertain, having been variously dated from as early as around 1790 to as late as 1870.

The house, which was added to the National Register of Historic Places on July 8, 1982, is privately owned and not open to the public. The architect was James Cali, and the restoration architect was John Sanguilano.

== See also ==
- National Register of Historic Places listings in Manhattan from 14th to 59th Streets
