= 47 The American Sign Language and English Secondary School =

High school in Manhattan, New York

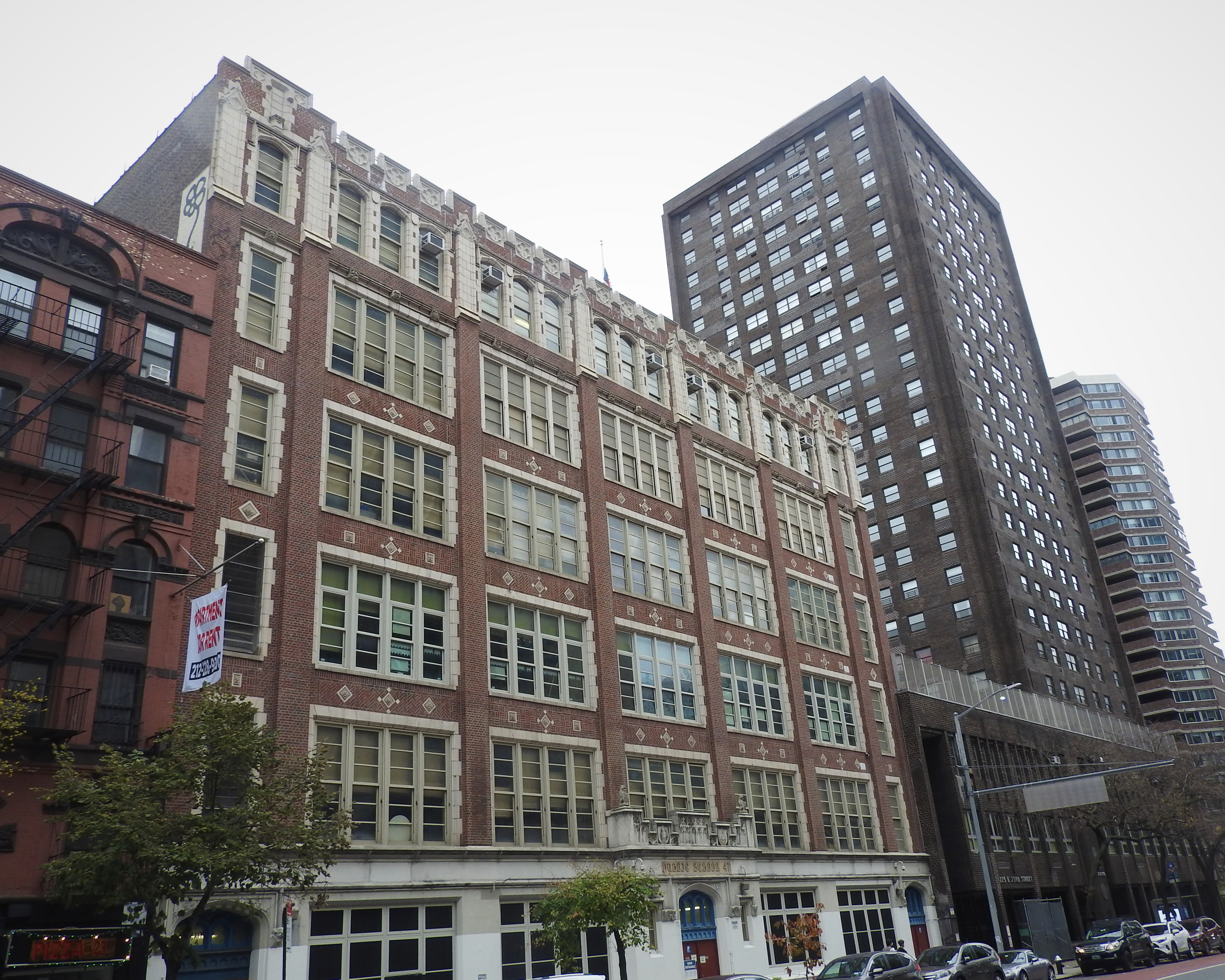
- View of school from 23rd Street

Location
- 225 East 23rd Street; New York City, New York 10010; United States; 40.7383°N 73.9814°W

Information
- Former name: P.S. 47
- Established: 1908
- School district: New York City Department of Education
- Teaching staff: 32.65 (FTE)
- Grades: 9-12
- Enrollment: 234
- Student to teacher ratio: 7.17
- Website: Official website

47 The American Sign Language and English Secondary School, is a public high school for the deaf in Kips Bay, Manhattan, New York City. Operated by the New York City Department of Education, it was previously known as "47" The American Sign Language and English Dual Language High School, Junior High School 47M, School for the Deaf, or Junior High School 47 (J.H.S. 47).

As of 2021 it only serves high school students. Elementary and middle school grades are covered by the separate PS 347 The 47 American Sign Language & English Lower School. The two schools share a building.

In the 1940s it was the only public school catering specifically to the deaf in New York City. This remained true in 1998.

== History ==
It was established in 1908 and was originally P.S. 47.

In 1973, the city purchased 400 First Avenue, located at the northeast corner of East 23rd Street, to serve as an expansion for JHS 47. Three years later, the school was expanded when a new wing was added into the base of an apartment tower at the corner of Second Avenue and East 23rd Street.

In 1998 the school was placed directly under the control of the NYC schools chancellor, and it was to begin teaching American sign language before teaching the English language. This made JHS 47 to be the first school in the United States to designate itself as an ASL language school. Despite its name at the time stating "junior high school", it actually served pre-kindergarten to the 10th grade. In 1998 the school announced it would serve up to grade 12, adding 25-40 students. By 1998 it served infants up to age 21. Martin Florsheim became the first deaf principal of the school.

In 2000 Florsheim attempted to move 35 teachers who did not have fluency in ASL out of his school and take in 35 who had ASL proficiency but the teachers' union opposed the move.

In 2002, its name changed to "47" The American Sign Language and English School. On February 1, 2005 Joel Klein, the chancellor of the school district, divided it into a K-8 and high school for budget reasons.

In 2010, the Department of Education proposed moving students from the Clinton School for Artists and Writers into the deaf schools building. This caused controversy over community members who feared this would disrupt the deaf environment.

== Student body ==
In the 2020–2021 school year, the school had 234 students.

== Instruction ==
The school uses ASL as its primary language. Previously the school had students use lip-reading, sign language, and whatever hearing abilities they had, which Jeff Archer of Education Week described as "an inconsistent mix". Florsheim stated that therefore, "There was no real clear-cut communication policy in our school" and that the school taught "a watered-down version of a general education curriculum". He stated that therefore the deaf students fell behind relative to hearing peers.

== Student discipline ==
In 2007, the State of New York had categorized it as a "persistently dangerous school". As of 2025, the school was no longer categorized this way by the State of New York.
