= Kips Bay Brewing Company =

Beer brewery in New York City (1894–1947)

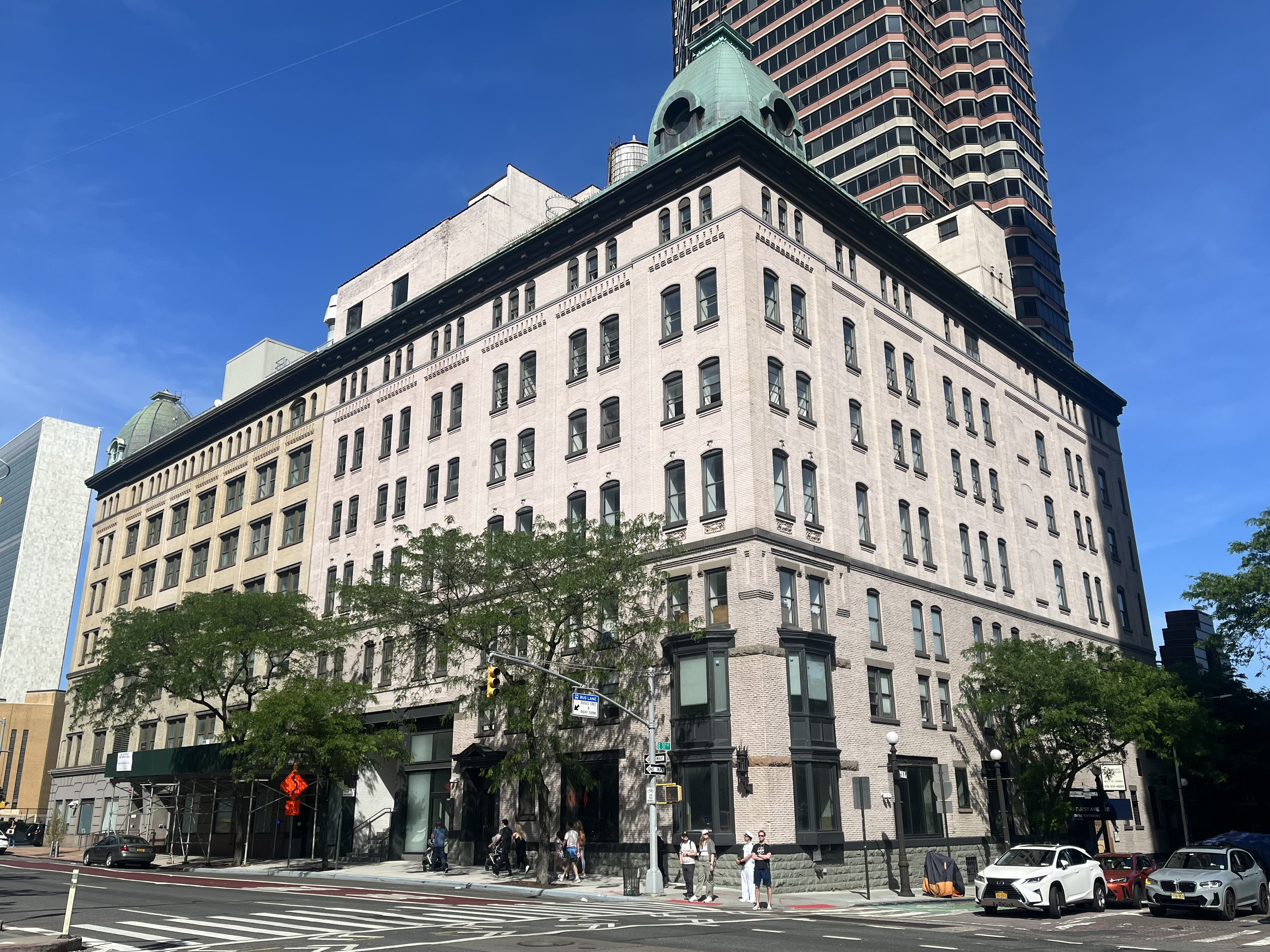
- Former Kips Bay Brewing Company buildings on First Avenue in 2023
- Interactive map of Kips Bay Brewing Company
- Location: Manhattan, New York City, US
- Coordinates: 40°44′45.5″N 73°58′17.5″W
- Opened: 1894
- Closed: 1947

Kips Bay Brewing Company, also known as Kips Bay Brewing and Malting Co. and Patrick Skelly Brewery, was a brewery located in Manhattan, New York City, that operated from 1894 to 1947. The former company's buildings have been repurposed into offices and apartments; they are one of two groups of surviving brewery structures in Manhattan from the period when brewing was a major industry in the city.

== History ==
=== Construction and early years ===
The brewery opened in 1894 on First Avenue between 37th and 38th streets and was originally named after Patrick Skelly, an Irishman who established the company. He renamed the business to Kips Bay Brewing Company the following year after the adjacent neighborhood of Kips Bay. Patrick died in 1908 and ownership of the brewery was turned over to his son Hugh, who served as its president until his death in 1943.

The brewery's facilities included the former Kips Bay Malt House, a six-story brick building located at the southeast corner of First Avenue and 38th Street, which Skelly bought at a trustee's auction in March 1892. The purchase included property having frontages of 148.1 feet (45.1 m) on First Avenue and 150 feet (46 m) on 38th Street and also contained more than 80 feet (24 m) of waterfront access on the East River. The malt house had been previously owned by brewers Simon Bernheimer and David Jones; its sale had been ordered by a court in 1890 as a result of legal action taken by the executors of the estate of David Jones following his death in 1881.

In September 1892, plans were prepared by architects Lederle & Co. for a brewery and stock house at 648-650 First Avenue having a frontage of 44.6 feet (13.6 m) and a depth of 125 feet (38 m). Maps published by G.W. Bromley & Co. and the Sanborn Map Company indicate that by 1899 the company's facilities had expanded southward along the east side of First Avenue to its intersection with 37th Street. According to the records of architects J. B. Snook & Sons, the firm was involved in designing several projects on the site including an addition to the roof at 648-650 First Avenue, a penthouse at First Avenue and 37th Street, and the "Kips Bay Brewery," the latter of which occurred in 1901.

=== 20th century ===
On the morning of January 25, 1905, a fire broke out in the grinding room on the fourth floor of the malt house, resulting in a three-alarm fire that drew twelve fire engines, four ladder trucks and three fireboats to the site. The water used in fighting the fire was absorbed by 115,000 US bushels (4,100,000 L) of grain and malt stored on the upper floors, which caused the building's walls on First Avenue and 38th Street to crack and ultimately collapse. The blaze was prevented from spreading into the adjacent brewery by a thick wall that separated the two structures and the actions of the firefighters to contain the blaze within the building where the fire originated. The Kips Bay Malt House was originally built by Otto Neidlinger in 1864; the building was characterized as "one of the oldest structures of the kind in this city" according to an article concerning the fire written in The Brooklyn Daily Times.

While the East Side of Manhattan was home to a number of large breweries in the late nineteenth and early twentieth centuries that took advantage of the East River for shipments of malt and hops by barge and the lagering of beer in the banks of the river, the Kips Bay Brewing Company was a neighborhood brewery that did not distribute its beer outside of Manhattan, catering only to patrons at its on-site taproom and to restaurants and saloons in the local area that were reachable by deliveries from the company’s horse drawn wagons.

In 1928, the brewery was shut down during Prohibition after a raid by federal agents discovered that five percent alcohol beer was being manufactured and smuggled out of the facility through garage doors that were camouflaged with brick and imitation steam and water pipes. The federal government seized the beer and took possession of the brewing equipment. The brewery reopened in 1934 after the repeal of Prohibition and remained in operation until 1947.

== Redevelopment ==
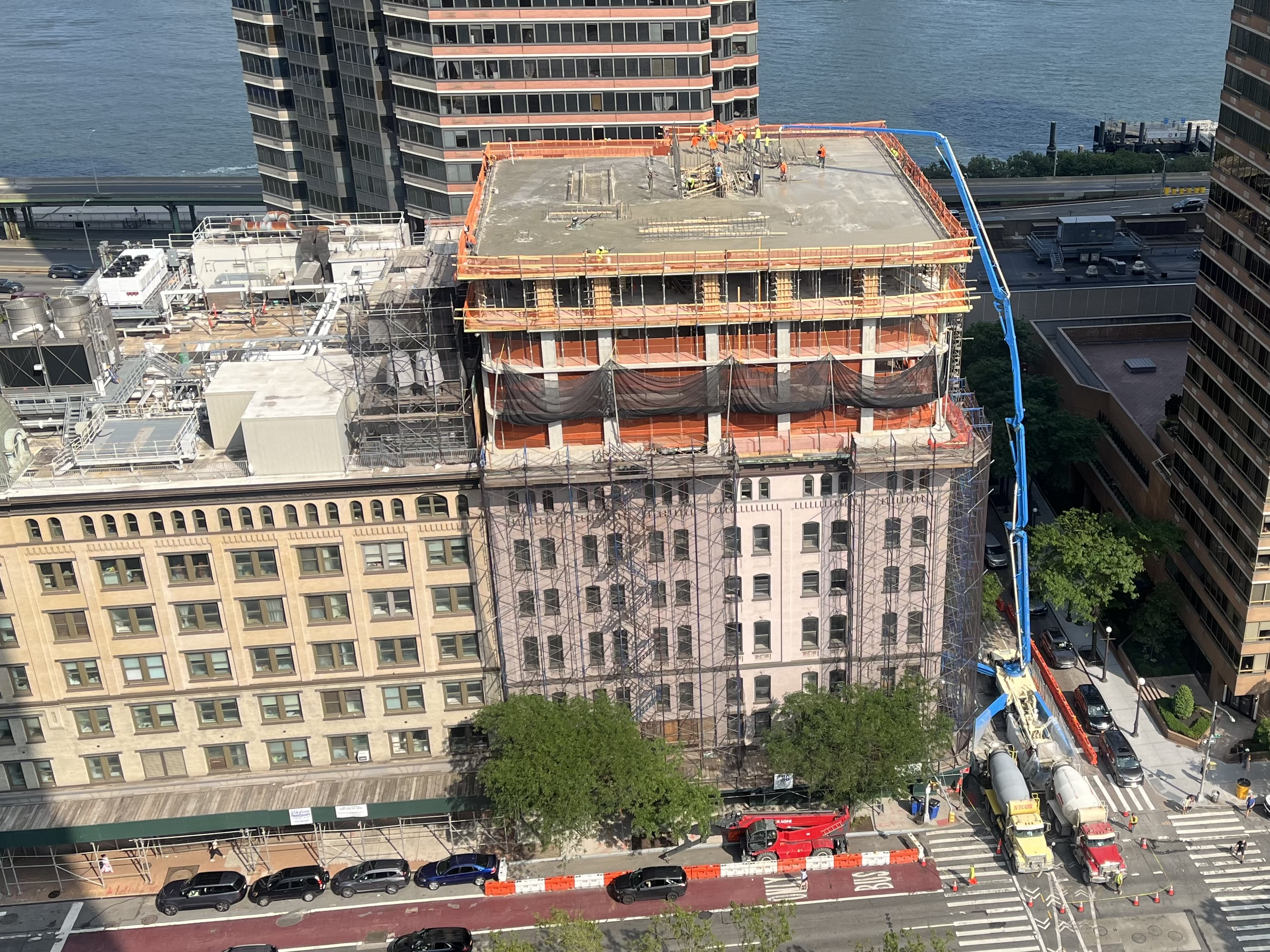
Construction of the residential conversion of 650 First Avenue in 2024

After the closure of the brewery, both of its seven story buildings remained intact and were subsequently converted into offices. These include 660 First Avenue at the southeast corner of 38th Street and 650 First Avenue at the northeast corner of 37th Street. Along with the former Yuengling Brewing complex on the Upper West Side, the Kips Bay Brewing Company is one of two groups of brewery buildings that survive in Manhattan from the period when brewing was a major industry in New York City. Each building had a copper-clad mansarded cupola in the French Second Empire style at the corner of the roof.

From 1953 to 1993, a major tenant in 660 First Avenue was CARE (Cooperative for Assistance and Relief Everywhere). The building served as CARE's United States headquarters for forty years until the organization moved to Atlanta. 660 First Avenue currently serves as medical office space for the nearby NYU Langone Health academic medical center. 650 First Avenue is a 125,000-square-foot (11,600 m^{2}) building that also primarily accommodates medical office space. While the former brewery's large floors and windowless space would normally not be appealing to most businesses, the buildings' proximity to hospitals and other doctors made them attractive as medical office space.

In March 2023, 650 First Avenue was purchased for $33.5 million by Lalezarian Properties, which planned to convert the structure into a residential building. Designed by Ismael Leyva Architects, the residential conversion revamped the interior of the building and added four new stories, raising the height of the structure to 125 feet (38 m) and removing the cupola at the corner of the roof. Over 11,000 square feet (1,000 m^{2}) of glass facade were used in the four-story addition to the top of the building. The residential conversion yielded a total of 111 apartments, 28 of which have been designated as affordable housing units.
