= Kips Bay, Manhattan =

Kips Bay
- Neighborhood of Manhattan
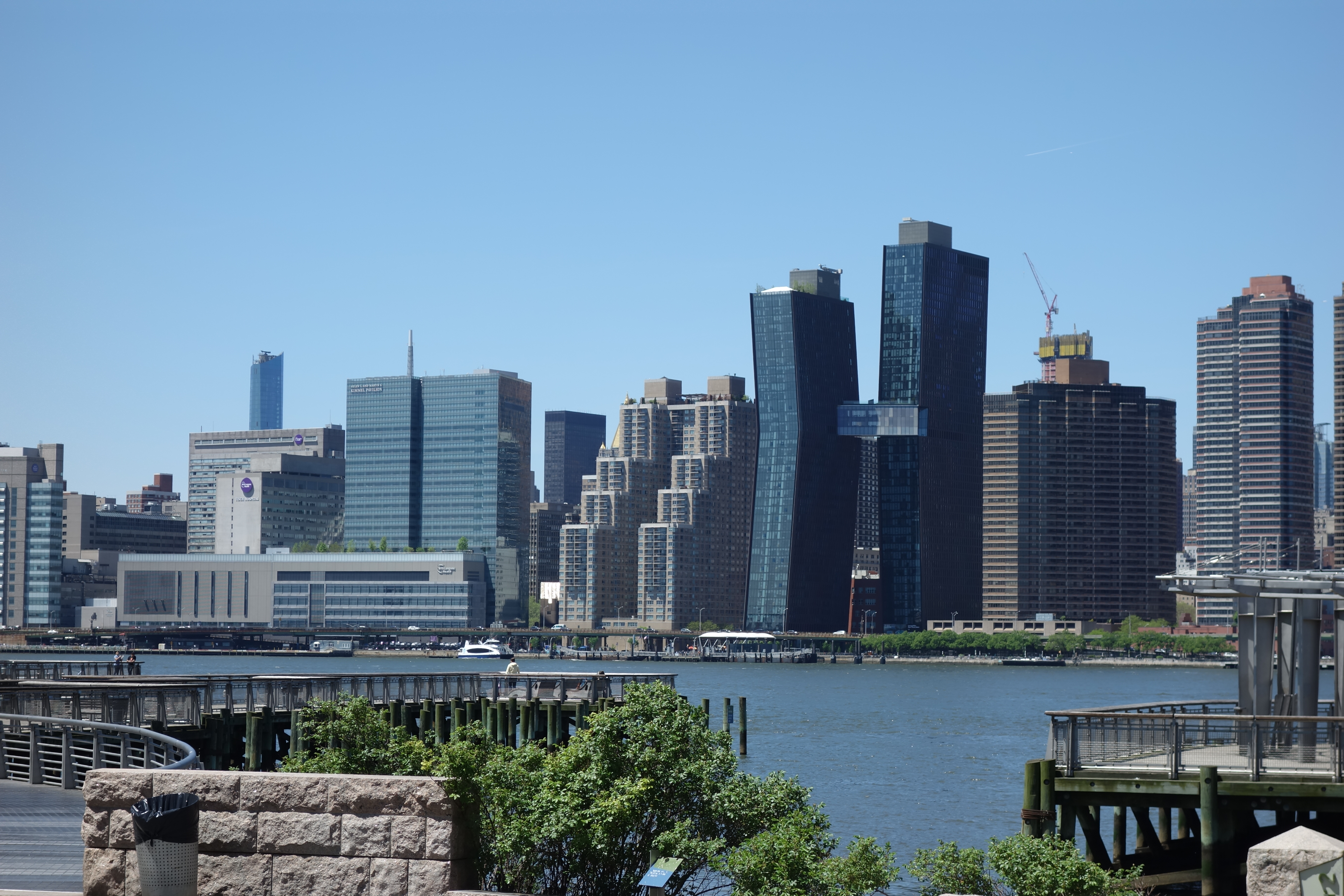
- Looking west at the Kips Bay from Long Island City
- Interactive map of Kips Bay
- Coordinates: 40°44′30″N 73°58′41″W
- Country: United States
- State: New York
- City: New York City
- Borough: Manhattan
- Community District: Manhattan 6

Area
  - Total: 0.5233 sq mi (1.355 km^{2})

Population (2010)
  - Total: 50,742
  - Density: 96,970/sq mi (37,440/km^{2})
- Neighborhood tabulation area; includes Murray Hill

Ethnicity
  - White: 66.6%
  - Asian: 16.2%
  - Hispanic: 9.9%
  - Black: 4.8%
  - Others: 2.5%

Economics
  - Median income: $99,107
- Time zone: UTC−5 (Eastern)
  - Summer (DST): UTC−4 (EDT)
- ZIP Codes: 10010, 10016
- Area code: 212, 332, 646, and 917

Kips Bay, or Kip's Bay, is a neighborhood on the east side of the New York City borough of Manhattan. It is roughly bounded by 34th Street to the north, the East River to the east, 23rd Street to the south, and Third Avenue to the west.

Kips Bay is part of Manhattan Community District 6, and its primary ZIP Codes are 10010 and 10016. It is patrolled by the 13th and 17th Precincts of the New York City Police Department.

== Geography ==
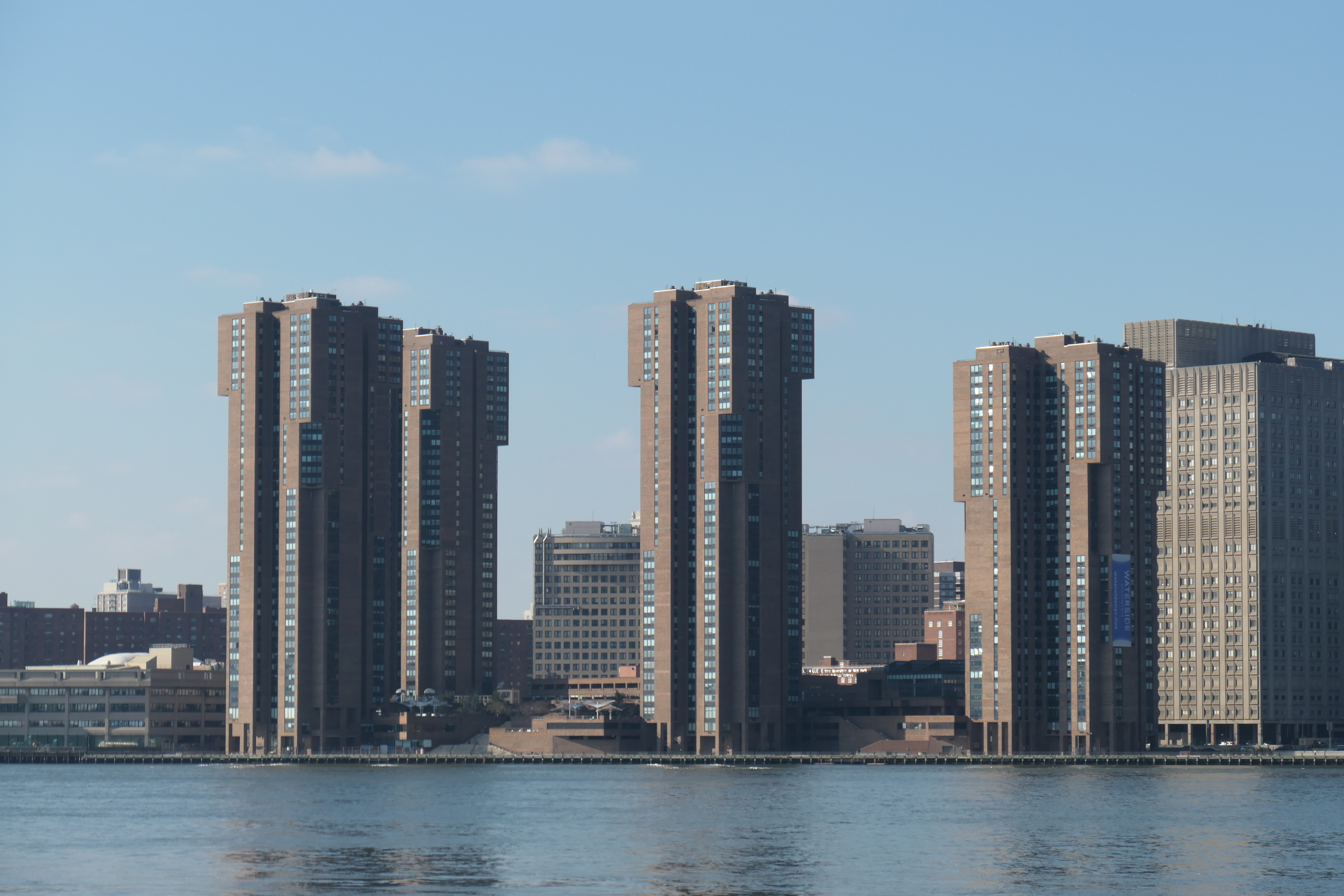
Towers of Waterside Plaza from across the East River

According to The Encyclopedia of New York City and the New York City Department of City Planning, Kips Bay proper is generally bounded by East 34th Street to the north, the East River to the east, East 27th Street to the south, and Third Avenue to the west. City documents have also used New York City census tract 70 (from 29th to 34th streets, First to Third avenues) as an approximation for Kips Bay, and referred to tract 66, immediately below it, as "Bellevue South".

The American Guide Series defines the combined Kip's Bay–Turtle Bay area as running from 27th Street north to 59th Street, and from Third Avenue to the East River, excluding the neighborhoods of Beekman Place and Sutton Place.

For its entry on Kips Bay, the American Institute of Architects' AIA Guide to New York City uses the area from 23rd Street north to roughly 38th Street, and from the East River west to just past Second Avenue. In AIA Guide, Kips Bay is adjacent to Tudor City and the United Nations/Turtle Bay area on the north, Murray Hill and Rose Hill on the west, and the Stuyvesant Square area and Peter Cooper Village on the south.

Other popular definitions of the neighborhood, such as that by The New York Times, include 23rd Street to the south, 34th Street to the north, Lexington Avenue to the west, and the East River to the east. To the north is Murray Hill; to the west is Madison Square, NoMad, and/or Rose Hill; and to the south is the Bellevue area or the Gramercy Park neighborhood and Peter Cooper Village.

== History ==
=== Colonial settlement ===
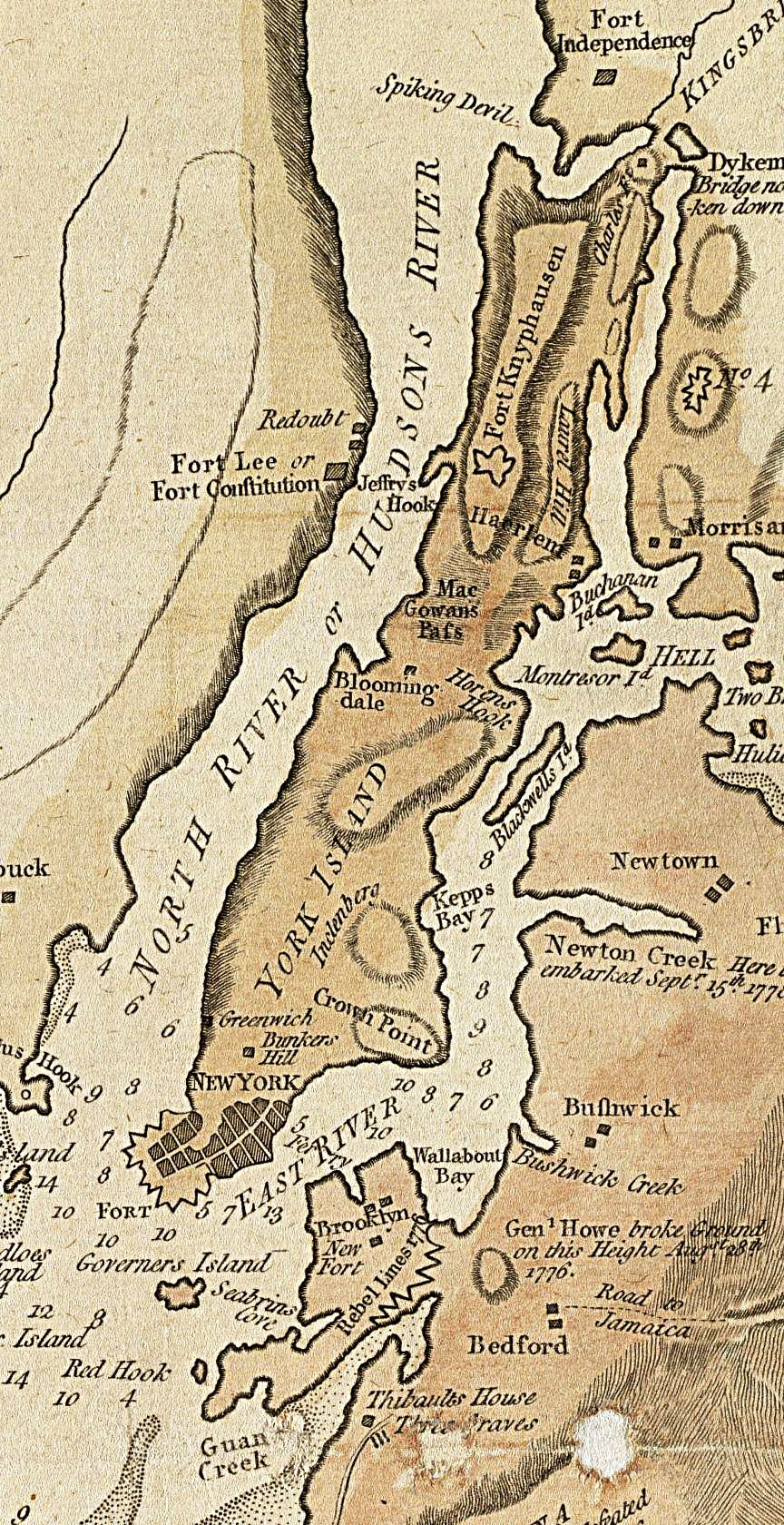
A 1781 British map depicting Manhattan; Kip's Bay is labeled as "Kepps Bay"

Kips Bay was an inlet of the East River running from what is now 32nd Street to 37th Street. The bay extended into Manhattan Island to just west of what is now First Avenue and had two streams that drained into it. Although the bay later became reclaimed land, Kips Bay remained the name of the area.

The bay was named after New Netherland Dutch settler Jacobus Hendrickson Kip (1631–1690); son of Hendrick Hendricksen Kip), whose farm ran north of present-day 30th Street along the East River. "Kip's Bay Farm" comprised a much wider area than the present neighbourhood and four properties established by early Dutch settlers: "Pieter van der Linde's Plantation", an area originally granted to Teunis Cray, "Gregorys Plantation" (probably in or near Midtown East) and "Schepmoes Plantation" (the northernmost, possibly in the vicinity of Lenox Hill). In 1655, Jacobus Kip built a large brick and stone house, near the modern intersection of Second Avenue and East 35th Street. The house was expanded more than once during the next two centuries, When the house was demolished (1851), it was the last farmhouse from New Amsterdam remaining in Manhattan. Iron figures fixed into the gable-end brickwork commemorated the year of its first construction. Its orchard was famous, and, when first President George Washington was presented with a specimen of its Rosa gallica during his first administration (1789–1793), when New York was serving as the first national capital city, it was claimed to have been the first garden to have grown it in the Thirteen Colonies.

Kips Bay was the site of the Landing at Kip's Bay, an episode of the American Revolutionary War (1775–1783) and part of the New York and New Jersey campaign. About 4,000 British Army troops under General William Howe landed at Kips Bay on September 15, 1776, near what is now the foot of East 33rd Street off the East River from a Royal Navy fleet which had first landed earlier on Staten Island, then Long Island for the pivotal Battle of Brooklyn (also known as the Battle of Long Island) the previous month. Howe's forces defeated about 500 American militiamen stationed at Kips Bay by Washington and commanded by Colonel William Douglas. The American forces immediately retreated, and the British occupied New York Town at the south point of the island, soon afterward forcing General Washington to retreat northward to the Harlem River.

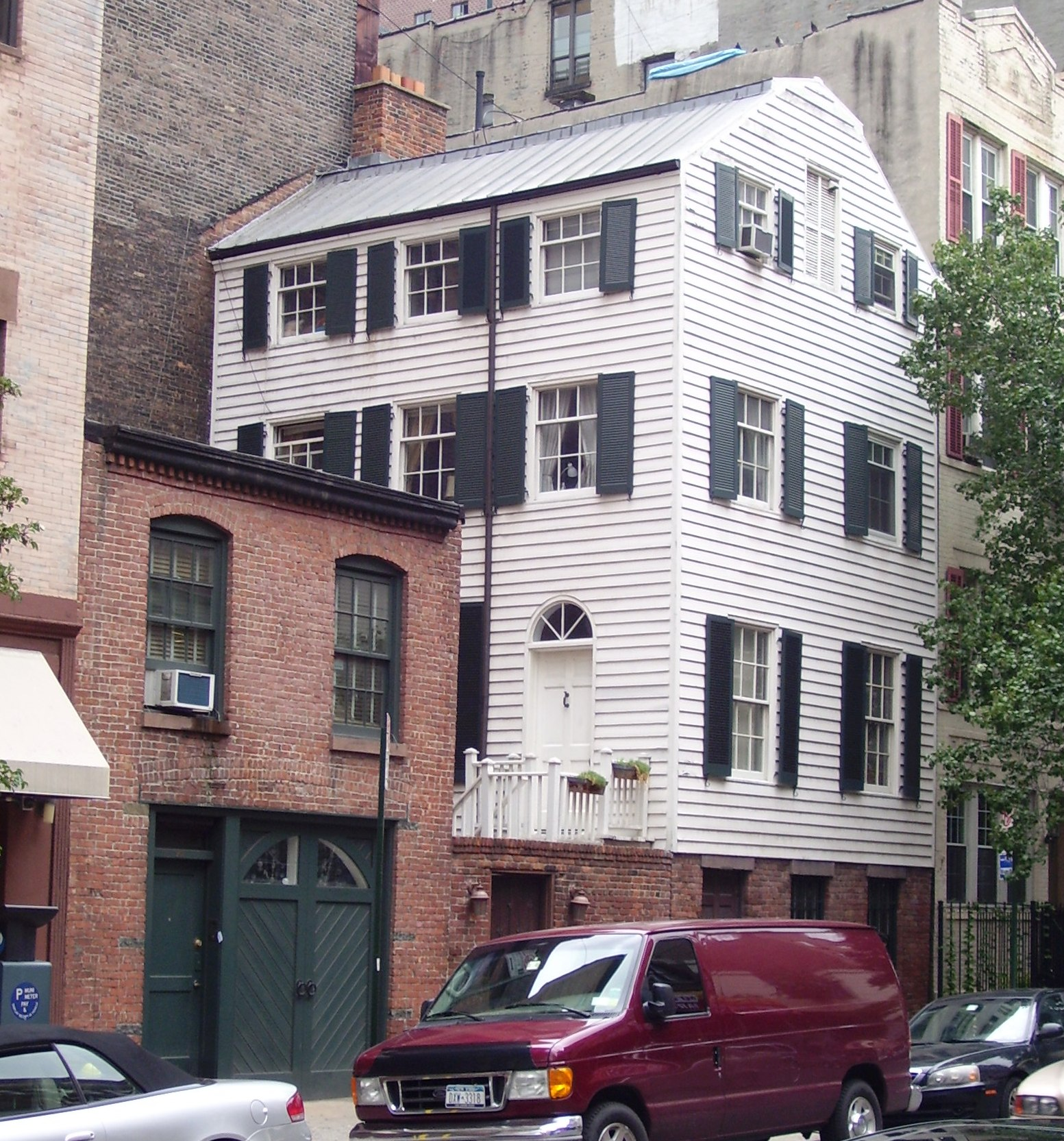
Wood-frame house and brick carriage house of uncertain age at 203 East 29th Street

A single survivor of the late 18th or early 19th century in the neighborhood is the simple vernacular white clapboard house, much rebuilt, at 203 East 29th Street. The house, standing gable-end to the street, is one of a mere handful of wooden houses that remain on Manhattan Island. Its date of construction is unknown but has been variously dated from around 1790 to as late as 1870; currently listed on the National Register of Historic Places, the house is privately owned and not open to the public.

South of the Kips Bay Farm stood the substantial Federal-style villa erected facing the East River by Henry A. Coster, in the thirty-acre estate that was purchased in 1835 by Anson Greene Phelps; towards the city, the Bull's Head cattle market fronting the Boston Post Road extended southwards from 27th Street to 23rd Street, affording a distinctly less rural aspect; the villa was removed to make way for row houses in the 1860s and the cattle market was moved farther out of town, to 42nd Street.

=== Later development ===
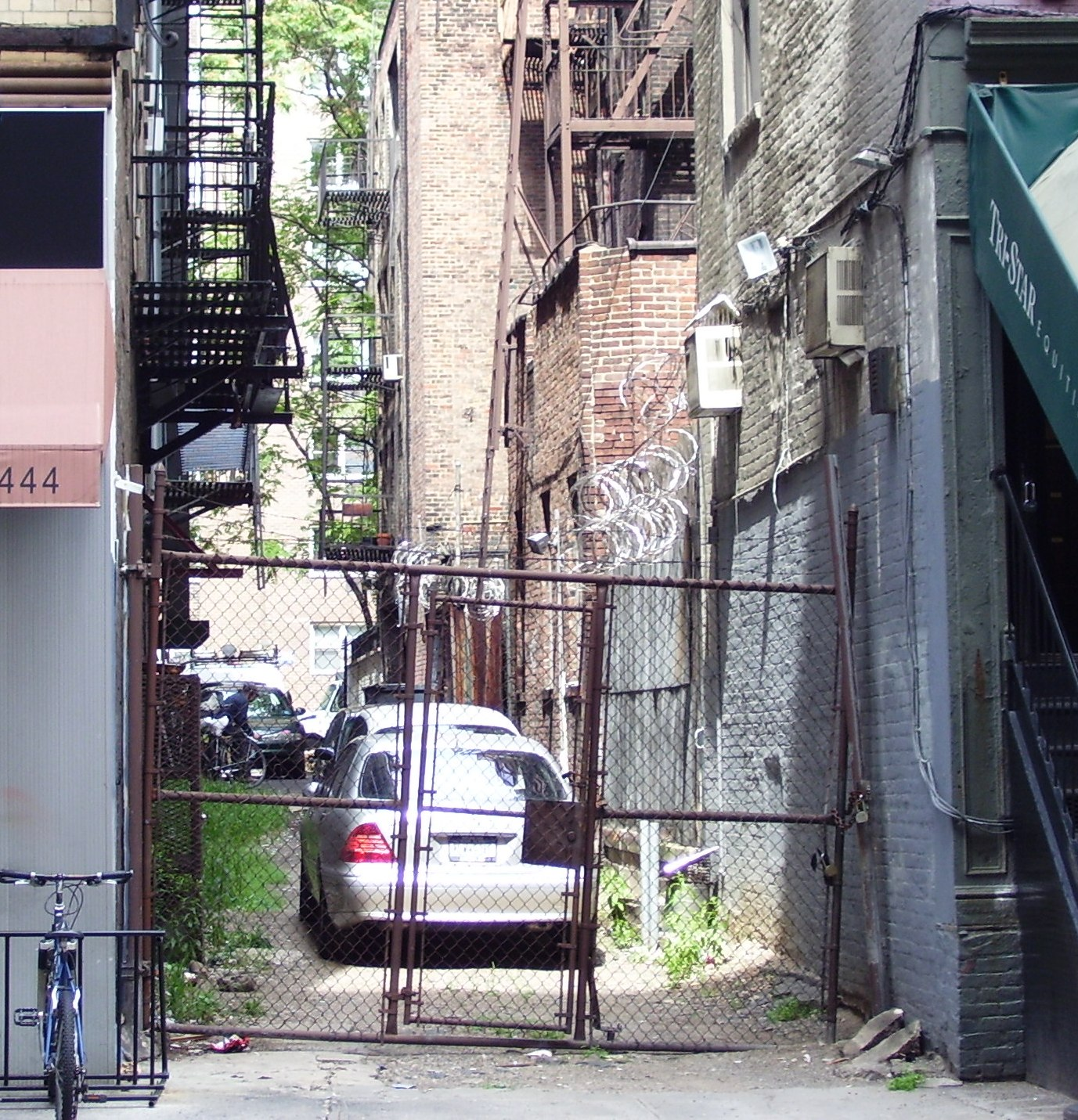
Broadway Alley in Kips Bay

The neighborhood has been rebuilt in patches, featuring both new high-rise structures often set back from the street, and a multitude of exposed party walls that were never meant to be seen in public. A nearly forgotten feature is the private alley called Broadway Alley, between 26th and 27th streets, halfway between Lexington and Third avenues, reputedly the last unpaved street in Manhattan (by 2024, the alley has been paved with asphalt); it is not known what this alley is named after, since it is not near the main Broadway.

In 1940 the Madison Square Boys (and later Girls) Club, which previously had been located on East 30th Street just east of Second Avenue, built its own facilities on East 29th Street (back-to-back with its older facility). In the 1990s, the Club sold its building to the Churchill School and Center, and moved its office in the Empire State Building.

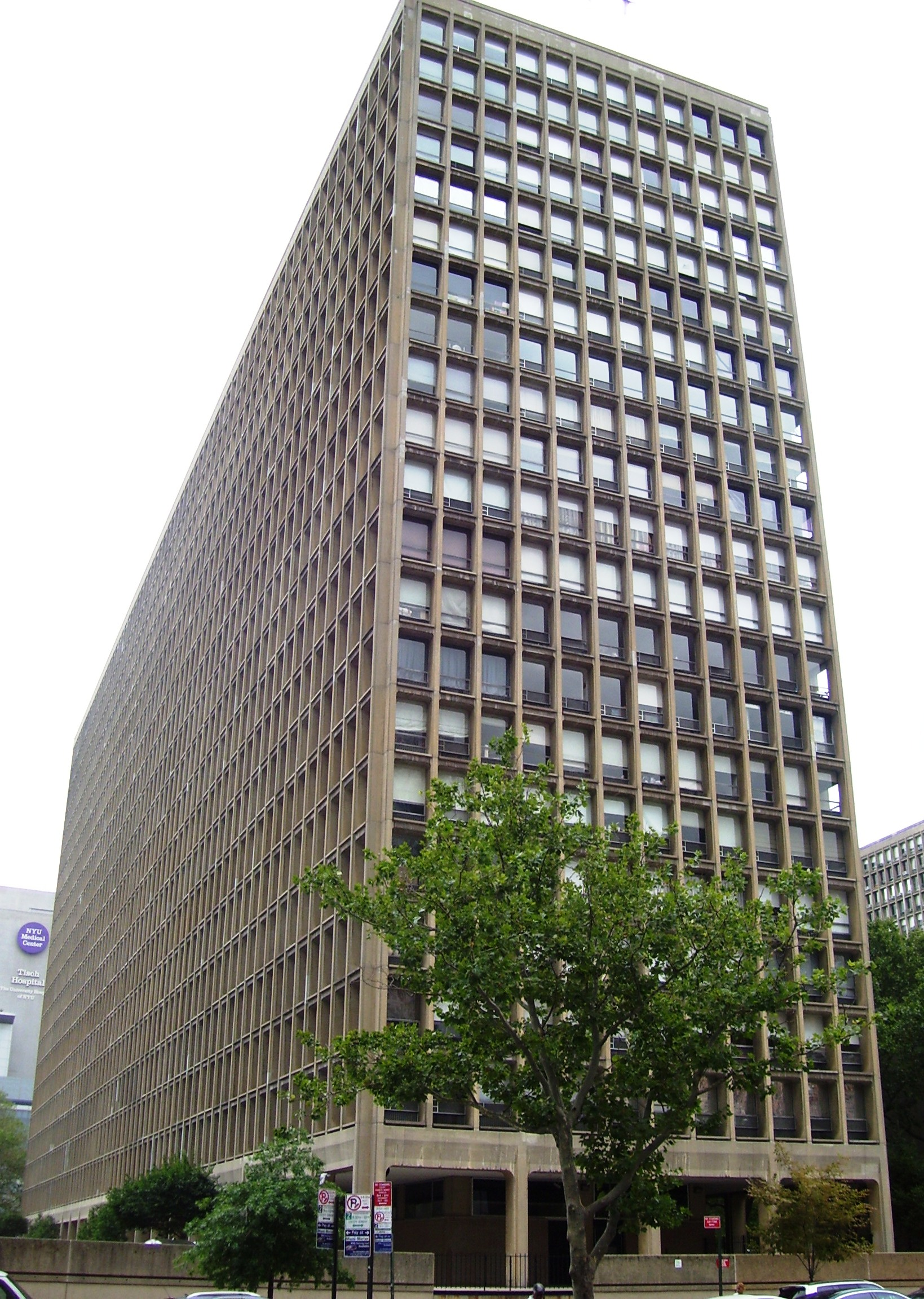
The North Building of the Kips Bay Towers (I. M. Pei, architect)

In the 1960s and 1970s, several high-rise apartment complexes were constructed between First and Second avenues as a result of urban renewal. Located between East 30th and 33rd streets, the NYU-Bellevue urban renewal project resulted in the development of Kips Bay Towers, a 1,112-unit apartment complex designed by architect I. M. Pei and completed in 1963. The Bellevue South urban renewal project, located between 23rd and 30th streets, resulted in multiple housing developments, including East Midtown Plaza and Phipps Plaza (named after 19th century industrialist and philanthropist Henry Phipps).

Waterside Plaza is a residential and business complex built on a pier above the East River between East 25th and 30th streets which is adjacent to another deck over the river constructed for the United Nations International School. There were plans to build River Walk, a development with additional above-water apartments, offices, and a hotel in the 1980s, but environmental concerns and community opposition doomed the project. Today, the waterfront south of Waterside Plaza is Stuyvesant Cove Park. The park includes a small man-made brownfield land mass extending out into the East River, which was created from excess concrete dumped into the river when the site was a ready-mix plant.

== Demographics ==
For census purposes, the New York City government classifies Kips Bay as part of a larger neighborhood tabulation area called Murray Hill-Kips Bay. Based on data from the 2010 United States census, the population of Murray Hill-Kips Bay was 50,742, a change of 2,323 (4.6%) from the 48,419 counted in 2000. Covering an area of 334.93 acres (135.54 ha), the neighborhood had a population density of 151.5 inhabitants per acre (97,000/sq mi; 37,400/km^{2}). The racial makeup of the neighborhood was 66.6% (33,818) White, 4.8% (2,423) African American, 0.1% (55) Native American, 16.2% (8,233) Asian, 0% (16) Pacific Islander, 0.4% (181) from other races, and 2% (1,008) from two or more races. Hispanic or Latino of any race were 9.9% (5,008) of the population.

The entirety of Community District 6, which comprises Kips Bay and East Midtown, had 53,120 inhabitants as of NYC Health's 2018 Community Health Profile, with an average life expectancy of 84.8 years. This is higher than the median life expectancy of 81.2 for all New York City neighborhoods. Most inhabitants are adults: a plurality (45%) are between the ages of 25 and 44, while 22% are between 45 and 64, and 13% are 65 or older. The ratio of youth and college-aged residents was lower, at 7% and 12% respectively.

As of 2017, the median household income in Community District 6 was $112,383. In 2018, an estimated 10% of Kips Bay and East Midtown residents lived in poverty, compared to 14% in all of Manhattan and 20% in all of New York City. One in twenty-five residents (4%) were unemployed, compared to 7% in Manhattan and 9% in New York City. Rent burden, or the percentage of residents who have difficulty paying their rent, is 42% in Kips Bay and East Midtown, compared to the boroughwide and citywide rates of 45% and 51% respectively. Based on this calculation, as of 2018, Kips Bay and East Midtown are considered to be high-income relative to the rest of the city and not gentrifying.

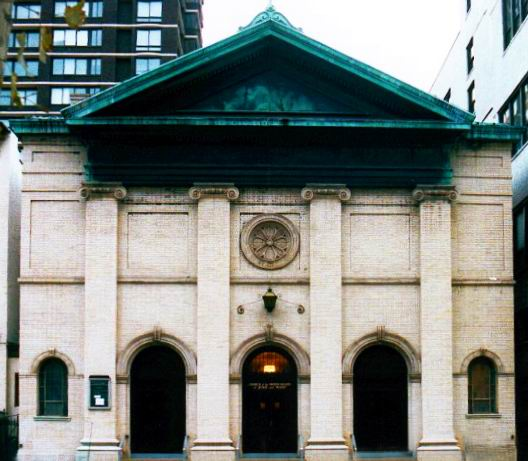
The now-demolished Church of the Sacred Hearts of Mary and Jesus (1915)

== Structures ==
Within Kips Bay, the area along First Avenue is dominated by the institutional buildings of New York University, including Tisch Hospital, NYU College of Dentistry, NYU School of Medicine, and Rusk Institute of Rehabilitation Medicine; Bellevue Hospital Center teaching hospital, including Hunter College's Brookdale Health Sciences Center and the Alexandria Center for the Life Sciences; and the Margaret Cochran Corbin Campus, a VA Hospital for the U.S. Department of Veterans Affairs. Further north on First Avenue, in Murray Hill between East 37th and 38th streets, is the former Kips Bay Brewing Company, originally constructed in 1895 and now occupied by offices.

Many businesses in the neighborhood use the neighborhood's name: e.g. Kips Bay Cinemas, Kips Bay Cleaners, Kips Bay Endoscopy Center and the Kips Bay branch of the New York Public Library.

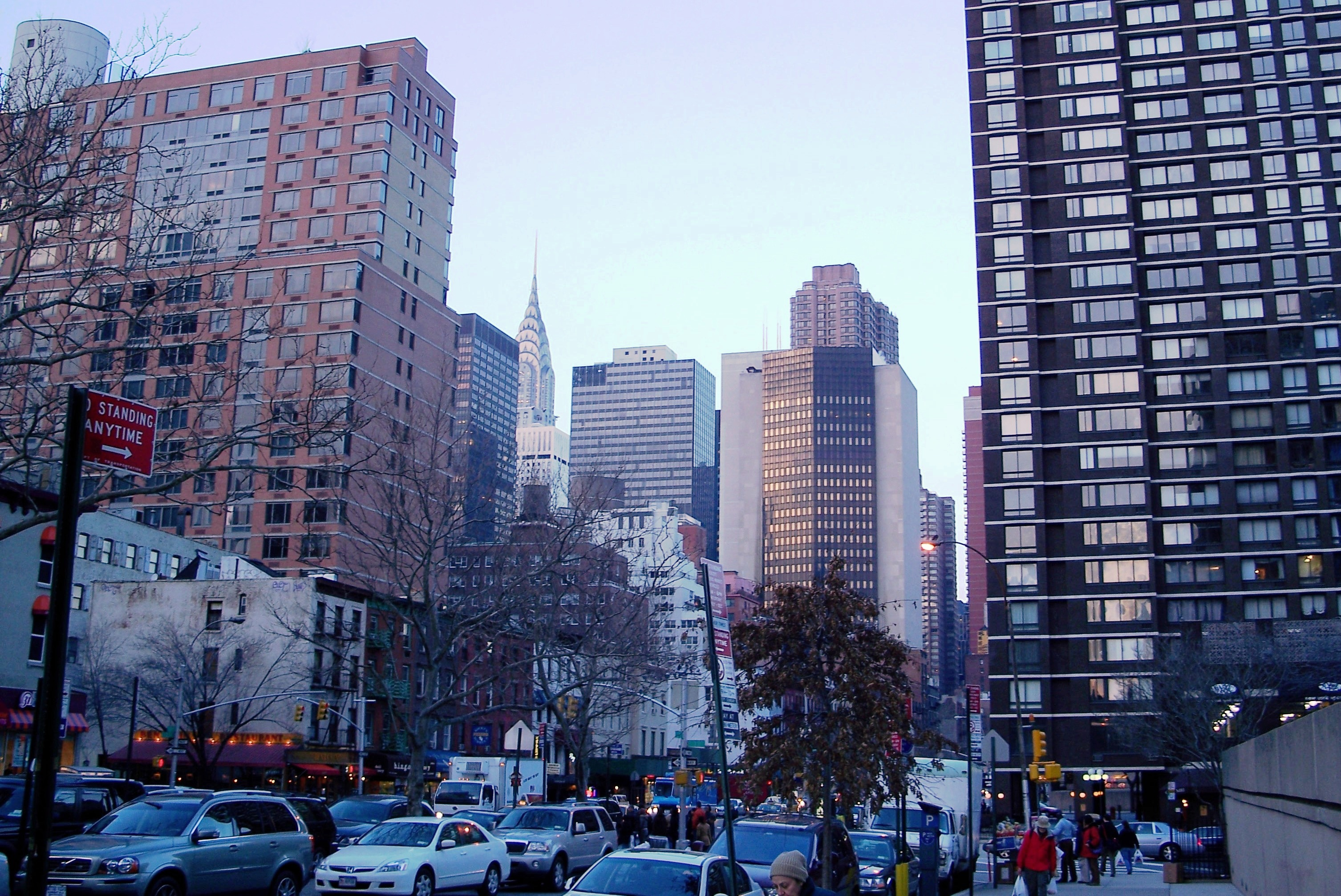
The view from the Kips Bay Mall on Second Avenue

Since 1965, the area has had a commercial strip mall on Second Avenue between East 30th and 32nd streets, set back from the street by a service road running parallel to Second Avenue. This group of stores is referred to as "Kips Bay Plaza".

New York City's first microapartment tower opened in Kips Bay in 2016. Named Carmel Place after its location at the intersection of East 27th Street and Mount Carmel Place, the building contains 55 units ranging in size from 260 to 360 square feet (24 to 33 m^{2}) and was constructed using modular units prefabricated at the Brooklyn Navy Yard. The project was the winner of a competition sponsored by the New York City Department of Housing Preservation and Development to design, construct and operate a microapartment building on a city-owned site and pilot the use of compact apartments to accommodate smaller households.

== Police and crime ==
Kips Bay is patrolled by two precincts of the NYPD. The 13th Precinct is located at 230 East 21st Street and serves the part of the neighborhood south of 30th Street, while the 17th Precinct is located at 167 East 51st Street and serves the part of the neighborhood north of 30th Street. The 13th and 17th Precincts ranked 57th safest out of 69 patrol areas for per-capita crime in 2010. The high per-capita crime rate is attributed to the precincts' high number of property crimes. As of 2018, with a non-fatal assault rate of 35 per 100,000 people, Kips Bay and East Midtown's rate of violent crimes per capita is less than that of the city as a whole. The incarceration rate of 180 per 100,000 people is lower than that of the city as a whole.

The 13th Precinct has a lower crime rate than in the 1990s, with crimes across all categories having decreased by 80.7% between 1990 and 2018. The precinct reported 2 murders, 18 rapes, 152 robberies, 174 felony assaults, 195 burglaries, 1,376 grand larcenies, and 37 grand larcenies auto in 2018. The 17th Precinct also has a lower crime rate than in the 1990s, with crimes across all categories having decreased by 80.7% between 1990 and 2018. The precinct reported 0 murders, 13 rapes, 63 robberies, 91 felony assaults, 80 burglaries, 748 grand larcenies, and 26 grand larcenies auto in 2018.

== Fire safety ==
Kips Bay is served by the New York City Fire Department (FDNY)'s Engine Company 16/Ladder Company 7 fire station, located at 234 East 29th Street. Completed in the late 1960s, the fire station consolidated Engine Company 16 (formerly located at 223 East 25th Street) and Ladder Company 7 (formerly located at 217 East 28th Street) into a single building.

== Health ==
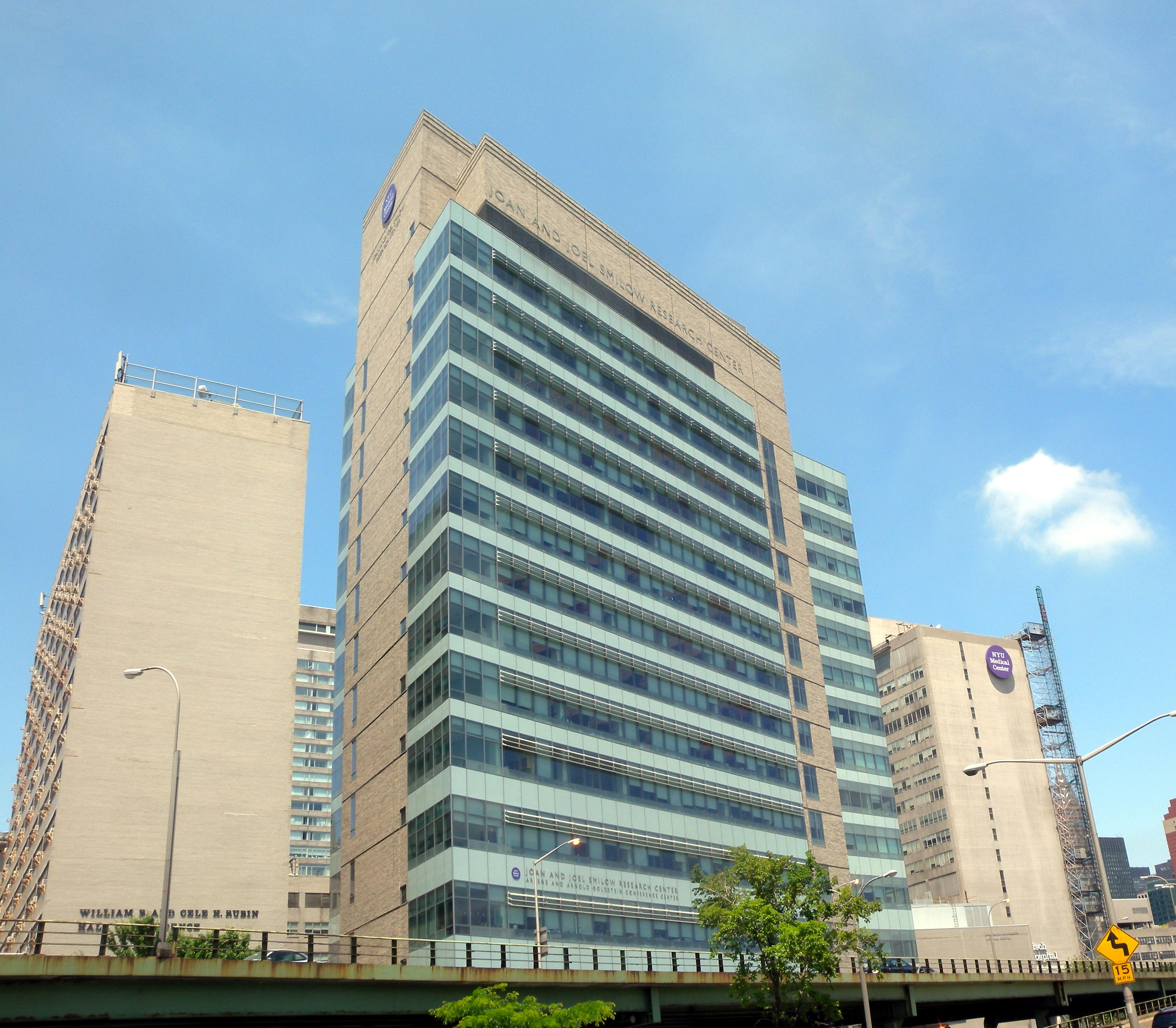
The Smilow Research Building of NYU Langone Health

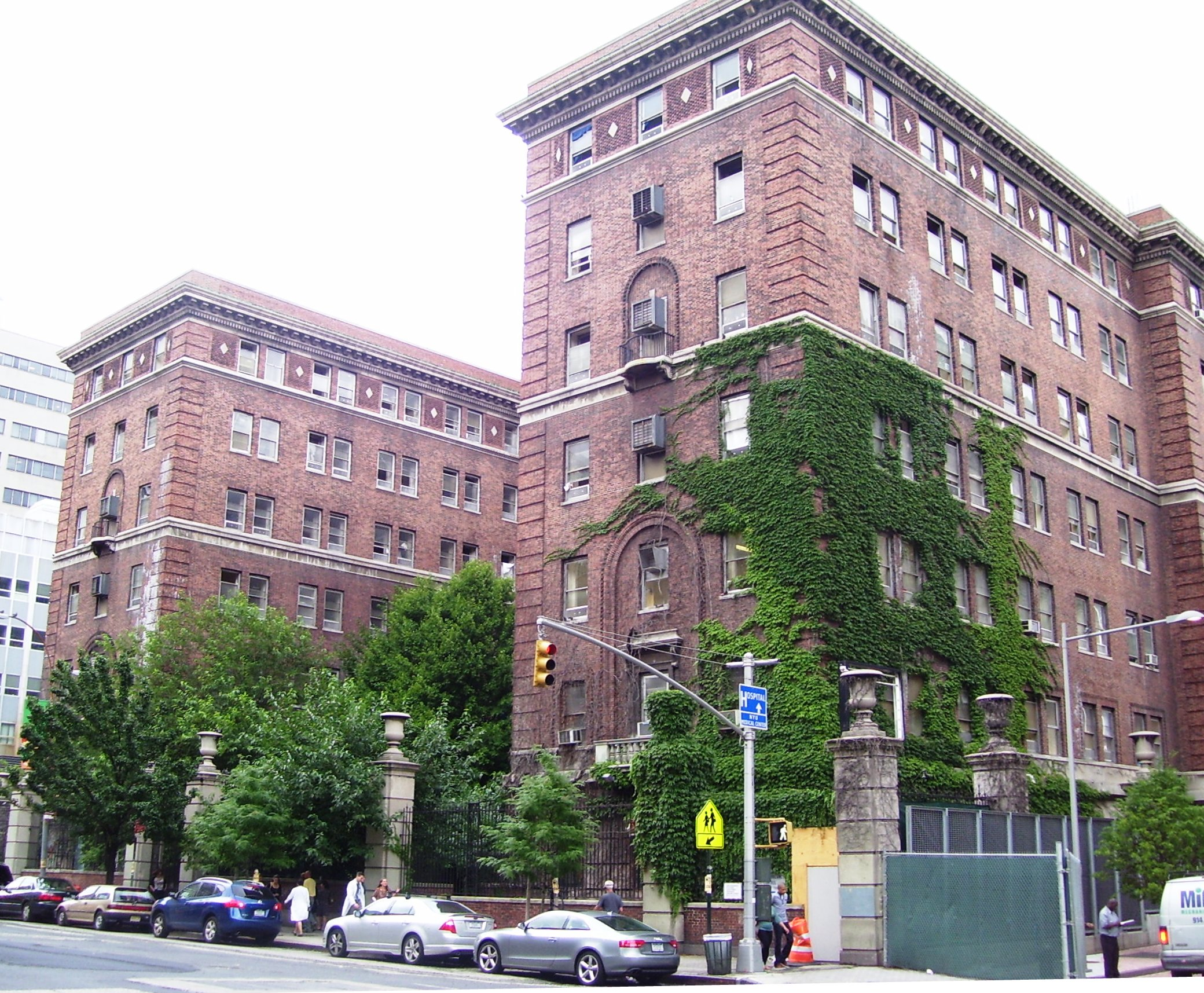
The original Bellevue Mental Hospital building

As of 2018, preterm births and births to teenage mothers in Kips Bay and East Midtown are lower than the city average. In Kips Bay and East Midtown, there were 78 preterm births per 1,000 live births (compared to 87 per 1,000 citywide), and 1.5 births to teenage mothers per 1,000 live births (compared to 19.3 per 1,000 citywide), though the teenage birth rate was based on a small sample size. Kips Bay and East Midtown have a low population of residents who are uninsured. In 2018, this population of uninsured residents was estimated to be 3%, less than the citywide rate of 12%, though this was based on a small sample size.

The concentration of fine particulate matter, the deadliest type of air pollutant, in Kips Bay and East Midtown is 0.0102 milligrams per cubic metre (1.02×10^{−8} oz/ft^{3}), more than the city average. Twelve percent of Kips Bay and East Midtown residents are smokers, which is less than the city average of 14% of residents being smokers. In Kips Bay and East Midtown, 10% of residents are obese, 5% are diabetic, and 18% have high blood pressure—compared to the citywide averages of 24%, 11%, and 28% respectively. In addition, 7% of children are obese, compared to the citywide average of 20%.

Ninety-one percent of residents eat some fruits and vegetables every day, which is higher than the city's average of 87%. In 2018, 90% of residents described their health as "good", "very good", or "excellent", more than the city's average of 78%. For every supermarket in Kips Bay and East Midtown, there are 7 bodegas.

The Bellevue Hospital Center and NYU Langone Health are located in Kips Bay, as is the Margaret Cochran Corbin campus of VA New York Harbor Healthcare System. In addition, Beth Israel Medical Center in Stuyvesant Town operated until 2025.

== Post offices and ZIP Codes ==
Kips Bay is located in two primary ZIP Codes. The area south of 26th Street is located in 10010, while the area north of 26th Street is in 10016. The United States Postal Service operates two post offices in Kips Bay:

- Murray Hill Station – 115 East 34th Street
- Madison Square Station – 149 East 23rd Street

== Education ==
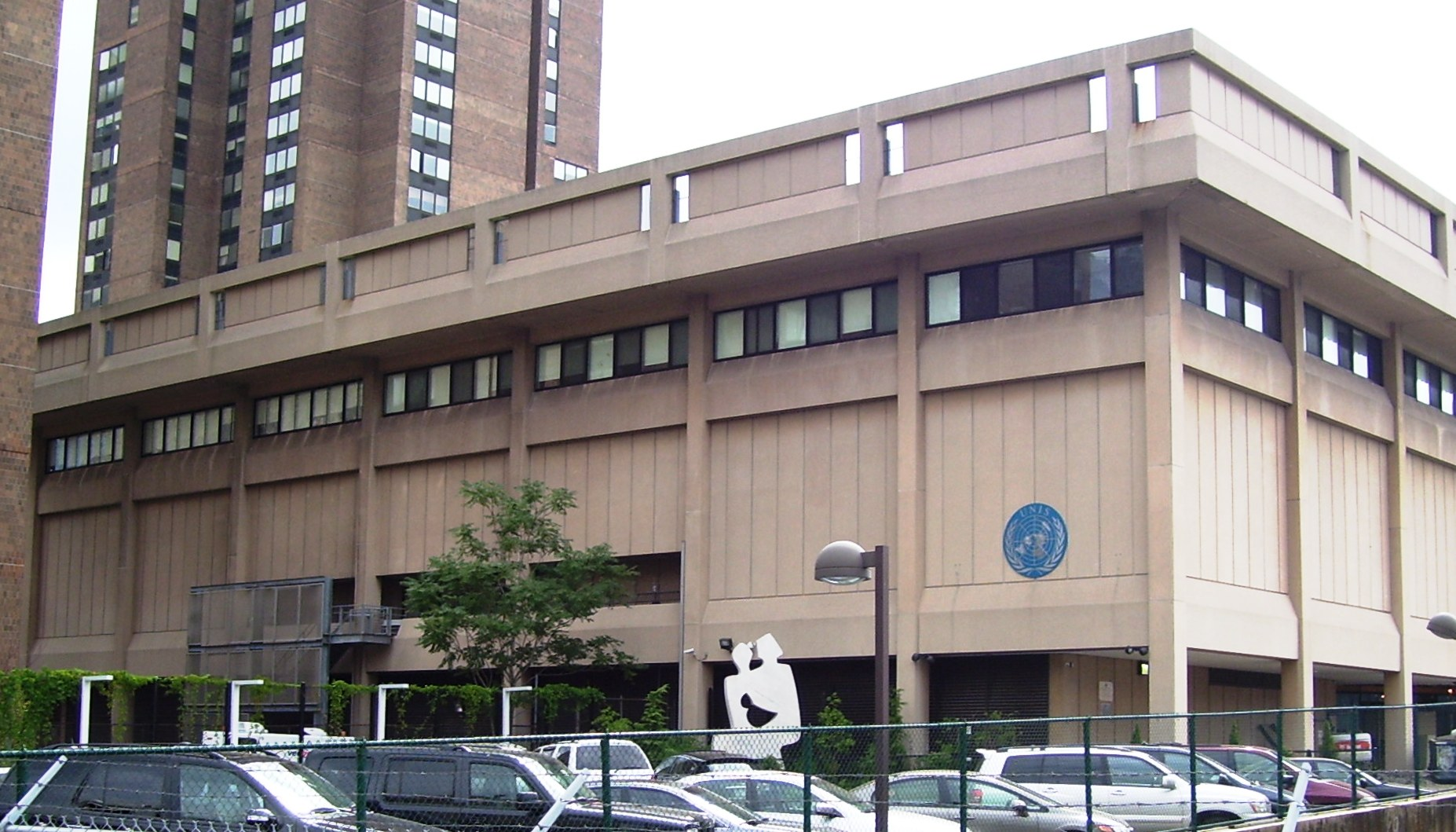
United Nations International School (UNIS)

Kips Bay and East Midtown generally have a higher rate of college-educated residents than the rest of the city as of 2018. A majority of residents age 25 and older (82%) have a college education or higher, while 3% have less than a high school education and 15% are high school graduates or have some college education. By contrast, 64% of Manhattan residents and 43% of city residents have a college education or higher. The percentage of Kips Bay and East Midtown students excelling in math rose from 61% in 2000 to 80% in 2011, and reading achievement increased from 66% to 68% during the same time period.

Kips Bay and East Midtown's rate of elementary school student absenteeism is lower than the rest of New York City. In Kips Bay and East Midtown, 8% of elementary school students missed twenty or more days per school year, less than the citywide average of 20%. Additionally, 91% of high school students in Kips Bay and East Midtown graduate on time, more than the citywide average of 75%.

=== Schools ===
The New York City Department of Education operates the following public schools in Kips Bay:

- PS 116 Mary Lindley Murray (grades PK-5) – the area's zoned elementary school
- PS 347 The 47 American Sign Language & English Lower School (grades PK-8) – provides American Sign Language immersion education for deaf and hearing children
- 47 The American Sign Language and English Secondary School (grades 9–12) - provides ASL immersion education for deaf and hearing children
  - The two ASL schools were a single institution until they were administratively divided in 2005. The two schools share the same building.

Students in grades 6-8 are zoned to IS 104 Simon Baruch School in Gramercy Park.

In addition, the British International School of New York is located in Waterside Plaza and the United Nations International School is located immediately south of Waterside Plaza.

=== Libraries ===
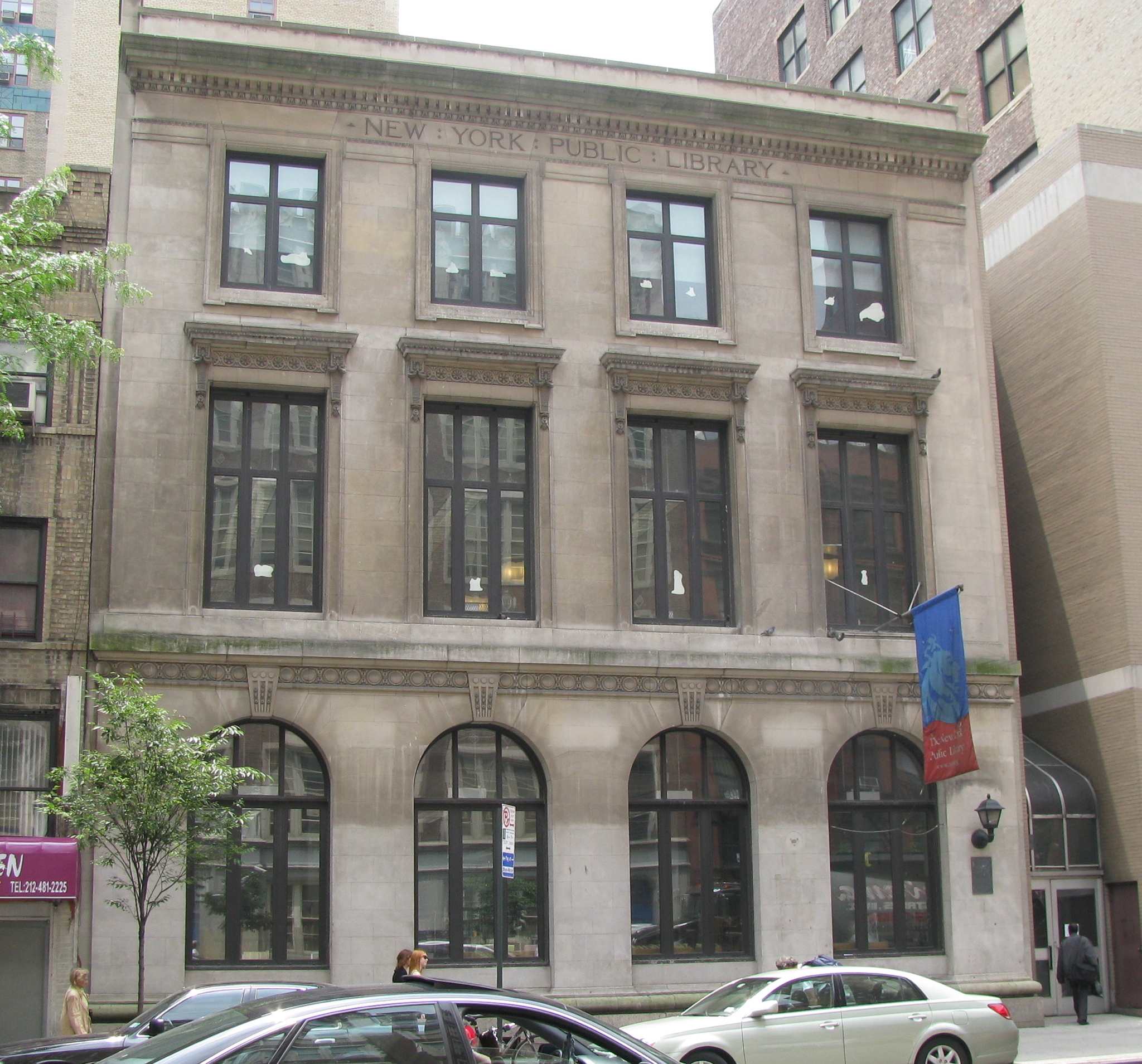
The New York Public Library's Epiphany branch on East 23rd Street

The New York Public Library (NYPL) operates two branches in the neighborhood:

- The Epiphany branch is located at 228 East 23rd Street. The Epiphany branch opened in 1887 and moved to its current structure, a two-story Carnegie library, in 1907. It was renovated from 1982 to 1984.
- The Kips Bay branch is located at 446 Third Avenue. The one-story branch opened in 1972 as a replacement for the St. Gabriel's and Nathan Straus branches, which had been torn down to make way for construction of the Queens–Midtown Tunnel and Kips Bay Towers, respectively.

== Parks and recreation ==
Manhattan Community District 6, which includes Kips Bay, has the lowest ratio of public park space per capita of all community districts in the borough and also ranks second to last among all community districts in New York City with regards to the percentage of district land that is parkland. There are three public parks in Kips Bay:

- Asser Levy Recreation Center is located on the west side of the FDR Drive between East 23rd and 25th streets and includes indoor and outdoor pools and an outdoor playground. The playground was expanded in 2014 when Asser Levy Place was closed to traffic and added as an extension to the park.
- Bellevue South Park, located from East 26th to 28th streets mid-block between First and Second avenues, was originally planned in the 1960s as part of the Bellevue South Urban Renewal Area but did not open until 1979 due to a lack of municipal funding during the city's fiscal crisis.
- Vincent F. Albano Jr. Playground is located at the northwest corner of Second Avenue and East 29th Street on a parcel of land that was originally purchased by the Triborough Bridge and Tunnel Authority in 1965 as right-of-way to construct the proposed Mid-Manhattan Expressway.

The East River Greenway, a waterfront path for walking or cycling, runs along the east side of Kips Bay and forms part of the Manhattan Waterfront Greenway.

== Transportation ==
The nearest New York City Subway stations are the 23rd Street–Baruch College and 28th Street stations at Park Avenue South, served by the 6 and <6> trains. The Second Avenue Subway is expected to eventually expand south to Lower Manhattan and pass through the neighborhood. New York City Bus routes include the M9, M15, M15 SBS, M23 SBS, M34 SBS and M34A SBS.

Kips Bay is served by two ferry landings on the East River, Stuyvesant Cove in Stuyvesant Cove Park near East 20th Street and the East 34th Street Ferry Landing. Stuyvesant Cove is served by NYC Ferry's Soundview route and East 34th Street is served by three NYC Ferry routes (Astoria, East River, and Soundview) as well as Seastreak.

Other transportation facilities in the area include the East 34th Street Heliport and the New York Skyports Seaplane Base, the latter of which is located in the East River at the foot of East 23rd Street.
