= Jeremiah Milbank (philanthropist) =

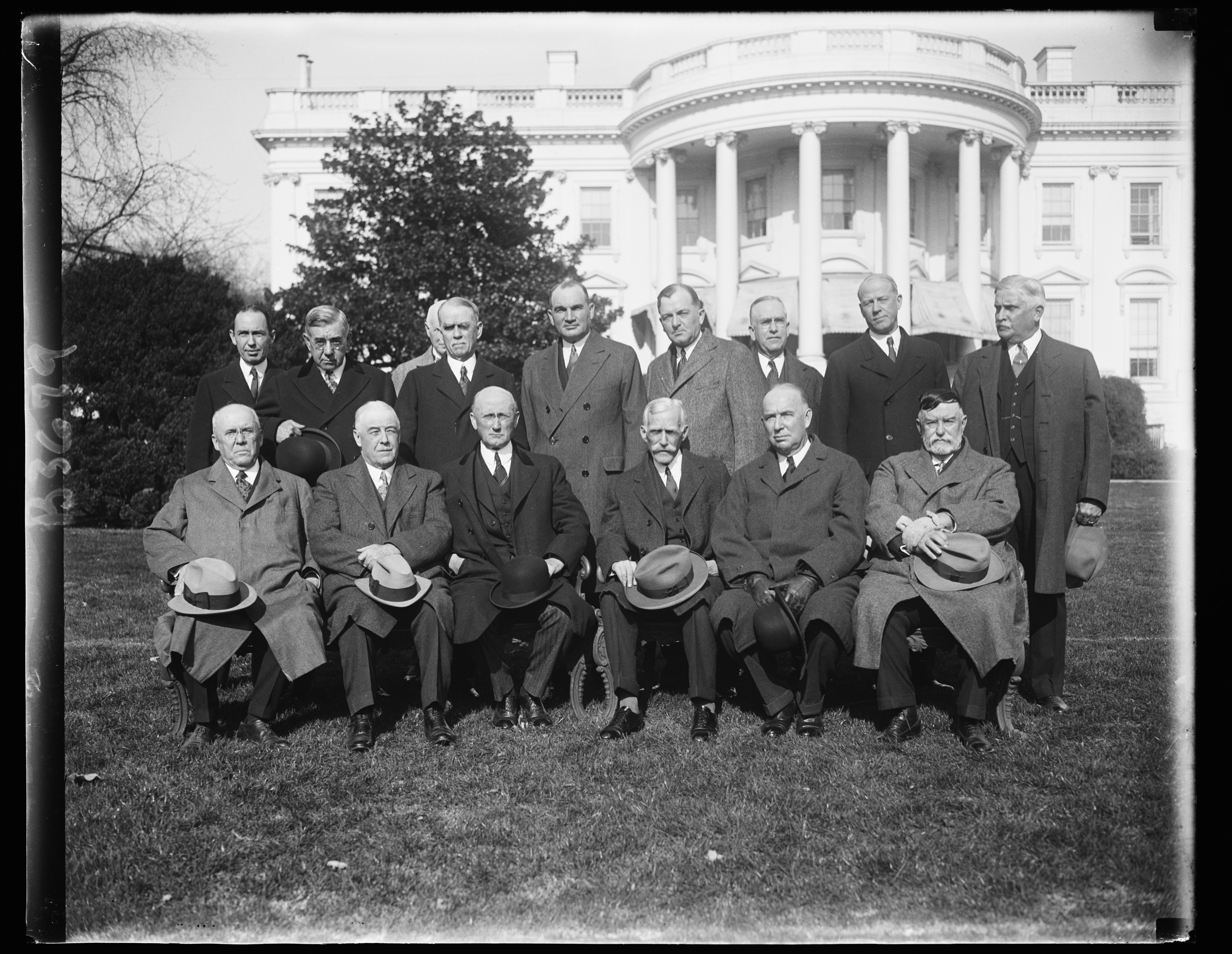
- Jeremiah Milbank, standing at the left side of the back row, at the White House in 1929
- Born: January 24, 1887; New York City, U.S.
- Died: March 22, 1972 (aged 85); Greenwich, Connecticut, U.S.

Jeremiah Milbank (1887–1972) was an American philanthropist noted for his close friendship with President Herbert Hoover. His grandfather, also named Jeremiah (1818-1884), lived in New York City and in Greenwich, CT and was a dry goods merchant who became a partner in Borden, Inc., making a fortune in the condensed milk industry. Milbank founded the Institute for the Crippled and Disabled (later renamed the Institute for Career Development) in 1917 in collaboration with the Red Cross as a rehabilitation center for disabled World War I veterans. In 1928, Milbank organized the International Committee for the Study of Infantile Paralysis and later served on the original Board of Trustees of the March of Dimes. Milbank served as a treasurer of the Republican National Committee, and often hosted Herbert Hoover on his yacht Saunterer, including to celebrate Thomas Edison's 82nd birthday. He later joined Hoover in founding the Boys & Girls Clubs of America and served as treasurer of the national organization for 25 years. His son, Jeremiah Milbank Jr., later served as chairman of the organization.
