= River Walk (Manhattan) =

Unbuilt mixed-use development in Manhattan, New York

Coordinates: 40°44′0″N 73°58′23″W

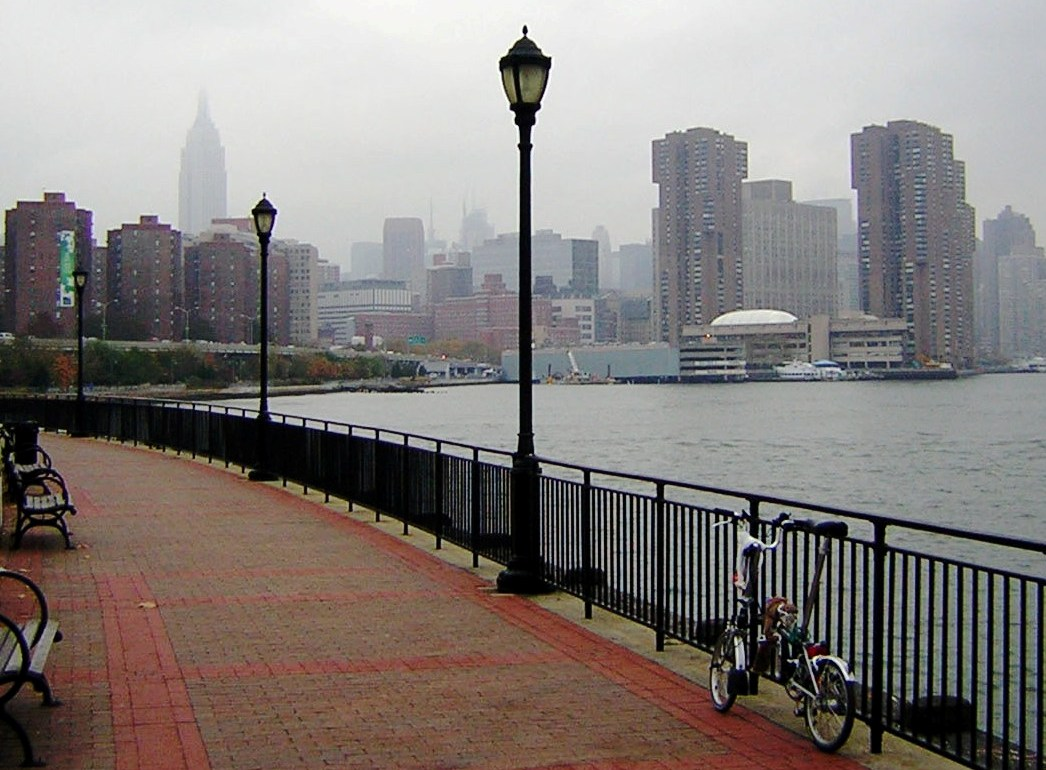
View of the proposed site of River Walk in 2007, looking north from the East River Greenway near 18th Street

River Walk was a proposal in the 1980s to construct a large mixed-use development on a concrete platform in the East River along the east side of the FDR Drive adjacent to the Kips Bay and Stuyvesant Town–Peter Cooper Village neighborhoods in Manhattan, New York City. The 30-acre (12 ha) project site ran from 16th to 24th streets, in an area of the river known as Stuyvesant Cove, and was located immediately south of similar platforms that had been constructed over the river for Waterside Plaza and the United Nations International School. Initial plans called for the development of nearly 1,900 apartments contained in townhouses and towers up to 32 stories tall, a hotel, commercial space (including offices, shops, restaurants and movie theaters), a marina, and a 9-acre (3.6 ha) park with a waterfront promenade.

Although River Walk was supported by Mayor Ed Koch, the project was opposed by residents of neighboring communities and the elected officials representing their districts. The proposal was ultimately withdrawn by the developer in 1990 and officially terminated by the city in 1992. The landside portion of the project site was subsequently developed by the city as a waterfront park, which opened as Stuyvesant Cove Park in 2002.

== Background ==
Locator Map
List of numbered map items:
1 River Walk (proposed)
2 Waterside Plaza
3 United Nations International School
4 Skyport Marina
5 Peter Cooper Village
6 Stuyvesant Town

In 1965, Title 33 of the United States Code was amended to designate the segment of the East River from 17th to 30th streets along the Manhattan shoreline within the pierhead line as non-navigable, so the federal government could not expropriate the property under its powers to regulate navigable waters. The matter to change the designation of the river segment had been brought before Congress at the request of Mayor Robert F. Wagner Jr. by Emanuel Celler, a member of the U.S. House of Representatives from New York's 10th congressional district. This allowed for the subsequent construction of platforms in the river containing Waterside Plaza, located between 25th and 30th streets, and the United Nations International School (UNIS), located at 25th Street. The segment of the waterfront to the south of Waterside Plaza and the UNIS was known as Stuyvesant Cove and included the Skyport Marina, a gas station, and parking. The portion of the waterfront near 20th Street was formerly occupied by the Transit Mix Concrete Corporation.

In 1975, Manhattan Community Board 6 requested the city build a $10 million waterfront park at Stuyvesant Cove, but the city turned down the request due to the fiscal crisis and mentioned that park space could potentially be included in plans put forth by private developers. Two years later, Manhattan restaurateur Melvin Stier approached the city's Department of Ports and Terminals with a proposal to redevelop the site in a manner similar to Faneuil Hall in Boston. After obtaining a positive reception from the city and financial backing from Alfred Bloomingdale and hotelier Edwin Linquist, his team proceeded to work on detailed designs and feasibility studies for the proposed project. The same site had also been talked about by other developers as a potential location for residential housing or a waterfront restaurant. The site had also been identified as a potential location for housing and recreational use in a 1965 report by the Department of City Planning.

On January 18, 1979, City Planning Commission Chairman Robert F. Wagner Jr. announced plans for a $150 million development designed by architect Ulrich Franzen on about 30 acres (12 ha) of land to the south of Waterside Plaza with 270,000 square feet (25,000 m^{2}) of retail space containing restaurants and shops, a 300-room hotel, 200 apartments, a pier, and a marina for 300 boats. Plans for the project had been submitted to the City Planning Commission and were under review. Wagner's announcement came at a conference held at Cooper Union in which Mayor Koch spoke about his administration's goal of redeveloping the city's waterfront and specifically called for the construction of new marinas, restaurants and parks similar to those in San Francisco at Fisherman's Wharf in all of the boroughs of New York City, not just Manhattan. Wagner did not reveal the name of the developer or further details about the proposed project, but promised that more information would be provided by the end of the month.

However, later that year the city announced that it would be soliciting proposals from developers interested in building $100–$200 million worth of residential, commercial and/or recreational facilities on the same plot of land.

== Solicitation of proposals ==
An announcement for a nationwide search for firms interested in developing the 30-acre (12 ha) site along the East River from 16th to 24th streets was made by city's Department of Ports and Terminals Commissioner Susan M. Heilbron and Deputy Mayor for Economic Development Peter J. Solomon on November 27, 1979. The city was not specific about what should be built on the site, but called for a mix of uses and included requirements that each plan include a waterfront esplanade and preserve views of the river from 20th Street, 23rd Street and Avenue C. The city also provided a list of land uses that it did not want proposals to include, such as casinos, discos, drive-thru restaurants, and music halls. The overall site consisted of 24 acres (9.7 ha) of property in the East River (to be decked over by a platform) and 6 acres (2.4 ha) of existing land on the shoreline. The city's request for proposal (RFP) had been prepared in consultation with Community Board 6; the board had obtained assistance from the Harvard Graduate School of Design in making modifications to the RFP.

=== Submissions ===
In April 1980, the city received four development proposals in response to its RFP:

- East Cove: This proposal was submitted by a joint venture between Rose Associates and Francisco Macri working with the I. M. Pei & Partners. The project was to contain 1,840 apartments in four 70-story circular apartment towers (two on the north end of the site and two on the south end) with 9.5 acres (3.8 ha) of park space. The apartment towers would have been the tallest residential buildings in the city. Paul Goldberger, an architectural critic for The New York Times, noted that Pei's designs for the towers drew comparisons to Chicago's Lake Point Tower. According to Frederick Rose and Daniel Rose of Rose Associates, their plan did not include commercial space because they felt it was infeasible based on their experience as the management agent for housing complexes at Waterside Plaza and on Roosevelt Island.
- East River Development: Michael O'Keeffe, owner of The River Café in Brooklyn, who was also preparing to open another waterfront restaurant in Manhattan located a few blocks to the north of the project site (The Water Club), led a proposal working with the Hillier Group (and later Edward Durrell Stone Associates) for a group of developers including Norman Kalikow and Harry Helmsley. The plan included 1,800 apartments in 5- to 15-story buildings on the north end of the site, a 300-room hotel on the south end of the site, and 100,000 square feet (9,300 m^{2}) of commercial space; the buildings were to be arranged around a central marina and stepped back to form an amphitheater-like shape. According to O'Keeffe, portions of the project could have been constructed offsite in a shipyard and floated into place.
- River Cove: Developers Alfred Bloomingdale and Melvin Stier of the River Cove Development Corporation worked with architect Ulrich Franzen on this proposal, which called for 500 apartments contained in two 29-story buildings and townhouses located at the south end of the site, a 600-room hotel, 382,000 square feet (35,500 m^{2}) of commercial space, and an expansion of the existing Skyport Marina to accommodate 400 boats. The plan included a shopping center on a floating barge, restaurants, and a recreation center with an indoor ice rink. The primary emphasis of the plan was to make the site a tourist attraction and a destination for residents living in other parts of the city. According to Franzen, the design of River Cove followed the philosophy of Jane Jacobs and was "a plan that comes out of a view of the city as active and lively and with appeal to everyone."
- River Walk: Cadillac Fairview Manhattan Corporation, a subsidiary of Toronto-based Cadillac Fairview, in a joint venture with New York-based developer Related Housing Companies, partnered on this proposal with architects Gruzen & Partners and the Hooker/Siskind Partnership along with landscape architect M. Paul Friedberg. The plan included 1,888 apartments contained in townhouses and towers up to 32 stories tall, a 245-room hotel, 250,000 square feet (23,000 m^{2}) of commercial space (including offices, shops, restaurants and movie theaters), a marina for 203 boats, a health club, 9 acres (3.6 ha) of park space, and about 1,900 parking spaces.

The costs of the proposals were $200 million for River Walk, $250 million for both East River Development and River Cove, and $350 million for East Cove.

=== Review of proposals ===
The proposals were reviewed by Community Board 6, city agencies, and financial and design panels to provide their preferences to the Department of Ports and Terminals, which expected to make its decision of the winning proposal by the middle of the year. The winning bid would then need to negotiate a lease for the land with the city, obtain environmental approvals from city, state and federal agencies, and undergo the city's Uniform Land Use Review Procedure (ULURP), the latter of which involved advisory reviews from the local community board and borough president, and approvals by the City Planning Commission, City Council, and Board of Estimate.

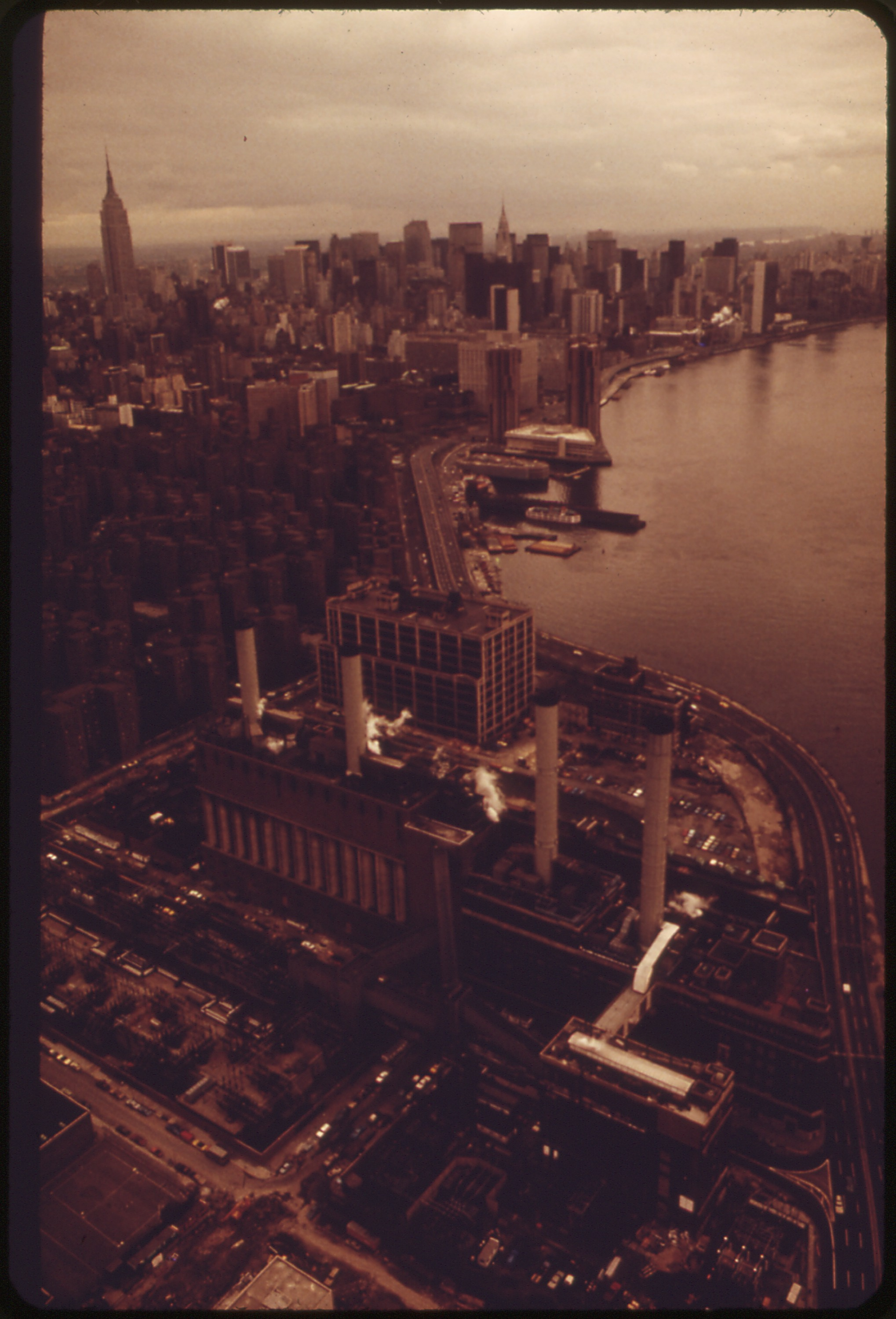
Aerial view of Stuyvesant Cove in 1973, looking north from 14th Street towards Midtown Manhattan

With a number of politically connected lawyers representing each of the development teams—including Harold L. Fisher (a former chairman of the Metropolitan Transportation Authority), Judah Gribetz (a former deputy mayor and former chief counsel to Governor Hugh Carey), Howard Squadron, and John Zuccotti—an article in the New York Daily News said "it's the political clout of the lawyers that will determine final approval from City Hall." This comment was rebutted in a letter to the editor by Ports and Terminals Commissioner Susan Heilbron, who said that the selection was being made "through an open and accountable process, and not on the alleged political influence of any of the respective development teams."

The River Walk team also engaged the assistance of the politically connected public relations expert Howard Rubenstein. In addition to having Harold L. Fisher for legal representation, the River Walk team retained lawyer Charles Moerdler (a former commissioner of the city's Buildings Department), and added James Greilsheimer after he left his position of first deputy Corporation Counsel in February 1980.

On June 9, 1980, the Waterfront Committee of Community Board 6 selected the East Cove proposal as its preference with modifications to the plan to eliminate the two towers on the north end of the site and reduce the height of the two towers on the south end of the site. The modifications recommended by the committee were agreed to by developer. Later that month, the full community board voted on the proposals, but did not have a clear-cut favorite with 16 votes going to East Cove (with the amendments), 11 votes for River Cove, 8 votes for River Walk, and no votes for East River Development.

=== Selection of developer ===
On July 17, 1980, the River Walk proposal was announced as the winning bid at a news conference held on the waterfront at the project site, which was attended by Mayor Koch, Ports and Terminals Commissioner Susan Heilbron, and Stephen M. Ross of Related Housing Companies.

The selection came as a surprise to nearly everyone, including the winning team of developers. Koch explained that the decision to select River Walk was based on its benefits to the city, which would generate at least $10 million a year in rent and taxes and provide 1,300 permanent jobs upon completion. Another factor in the selection was the varied mix of uses provided in the River Walk plan, as compared to the other proposals that only had residential (East Cove) or was mostly commercial (River Cove). According to a case study of the presentation of the proposals in a book by architect Ernest Burden, the River Walk proposal was the one that came closest to following the guidelines that had been established in the city's RFP.

== Approval process and objections ==
=== Initial plan ===
The initial plan for River Walk was divided into four separate areas that would be joined by pedestrian paths:

- Marina North would contain shops, restaurants, and movie theaters around a marina. It would also include a 32-story mixed-use building with office space on two of the lower levels and 704 apartments on the upper floors.
- Park Central would a 245-room hotel, a building containing 300 apartments and a health club. A multi-level landscaped park with ponds, streams and waterfalls and an outdoor amphitheater would be located between the buildings and the river.
- Marina Island would include 90 co-op apartments in six-story townhouses on a small island in the marina.
- Marina South would include 782 apartments, retail stores catering to residents, and a public promenade.

The plan included about 1,900 parking spaces, some of which would be used to offset the displacement of the existing parking garage at the Skyport Marina. The project sponsors planned a $1 million endowment to fund a public art program for the site and created a non-profit to program events held at the outdoor amphitheater. The complex was to be constructed by the DeMatteis Organization.

=== Early skepticism and objections ===
There was skepticism about the project's chances of getting built from the start of its approval process. In October 1980, an article in New York magazine mentioned that soon River Walk might be added to the list of major projects in the city that stalled or failed to advance, such as the Manhattan Landing development along the waterfront of the East River in Lower Manhattan and the Westway along the Hudson River waterfront. The article also questioned Koch's selection of River Walk as the proposal that would generate more revenue to the city, speculating that it may have resulted from internal analyses by the Department of Ports and Terminals, which misstated figures and claimed that River Walk would not take advantage of tax abatements available for residential housing.

The following year, River Walk's developers decided to seek a tax abatement from the city. Although the city's tax abatement program was available as an incentive for development, its use at this particular location, which had been referred to as the "Billion-Dollar Gold Coast", was questioned given that multiple development teams had submitted bids to develop the site. Tax abatements on certain portions of the project were agreed to by the city in January 1982. In the mid-1980s, when most properties in Manhattan were removed from the area covered by the 421-a tax exemption, a loophole in an amendment to the legislation excluded projects located outside of the bulkhead lines on the East and Hudson rivers, which meant that River Walk would still be eligible for property tax exemptions.

In October 1981, Melvin Stier and the River Cove Development Corporation, the developers behind the River Cove proposal, filed a suit against the city in New York Supreme Court seeking $100.3 million in damages claiming that they had originally come up with the idea to develop the site in 1977, were given assurances from city officials that they would be selected as the developer, but then the city decided to give the project to another development team with political connections to the Koch administration. The case was later dismissed as being premature because a final contract for the development project had not been signed. The city's selection of the River Walk proposal was also investigated by the Federal Bureau of Investigation over "the possibilities of irregularities."

Meanwhile, Community Board 6 voiced their displeasure about River Walk in 1981 by voting unanimously in favor of recommending that the city create a 17-acre (6.9 ha) park on the site in lieu of any of the proposed residential and commercial development.

=== Changes to development team ===
In June 1982, Cadillac Fairview withdrew its sponsorship of River Walk; the firm decided to leave the residential development market and focus its attention on commercial development as a result of a change in corporate policy following a consolidation. The firm was slated to provide 65 percent of the financing for the project, with the remainder to be contributed by Related Housing Companies. At this time, the Gruzen Partnership also left the project team. According to Jordan Gruzen, the decision was voluntary due to "differences relating to design and project management" that affected their collaboration with the Hooker/Siskind Partnership. Gruzen was replaced by the architecture firm of Davis, Brody & Associates in 1982. The following year, an agreement was reached with the city to add Credival, a Venezuelan firm, and the DeMatteis Organization as additional financial backers to the development team to compensate for the departure of Cadillac Fairview. The DeMatteis Organization had been previously involved with River Walk as the project's construction manager.

There was also a change in city administration of the project as oversight by the Department of Ports and Terminals was shifted to the Public Development Corporation (PDC) in 1985. PDC was a city agency that handled commercial projects built on city-owned land or with assistance from the city; it took over waterfront projects that had been administered by the Department of Ports and Terminals.

=== Modifications to plans ===
After Davis, Brody & Associates was first brought onto the project team in 1982, plans for the project were subsequently redesigned. By June 1986, the project was modified to include five residential towers ranging from 32 to 47 stories in height (as compared to a maximum height of 32 stories in the initial plan) and a new 14-story building was added to accommodate the office space. In November 1986, the plan was revised again, modifying the height of the residential towers to range from 38 to 48 stories and the hotel rooms were planned to be included in an 18-story building.

According to the development team, the redesigns were done to provide more views of the river, although they acknowledged that pedestrians would need go to the parks on the platform to view the water or be standing onshore at 20th or 23rd streets, as these roadways were to continue eastward providing access to the project. By 1990, the maximum height of the residential towers was reduced to 42 stories and the size of the marina was reduced to a total of 40 slips. Overall, the project was to include a 17-acre (6.9 ha) platform over the East River supported by 6,000 piles, which would be arranged to minimize the impact on river currents and tidal flows based on computer modeling.

=== Environmental studies ===
Similar to the Westway project, River Walk was delayed because of the significant number of environmental studies that were needed for the approval process. One of these studies was a detailed assessment of the effect of the proposed project on striped bass in the East River, which took three years to complete at a cost of $2 million. Government agencies also became more wary following the failure of the Westway project and requested additional data because of the fear of lawsuits. By January 1989, the project's environmental impact statement (EIS) had grown to 4,000 pages but was still not finalized; a total of $10 million had been spent by Related Companies on environmental analyses.

=== Opposition to project ===
In 1986, a group of residents from Peter Cooper Village, Stuyvesant Town, Waterside Plaza, and the neighboring communities formed Citizens United Against Riverwalk (CUAR). By the following year, about 1,000 people were participating in CUAR and the organization aligned itself with the Sierra Club as well as similar groups that were fighting against the proposed Television City project on the Upper West Side.

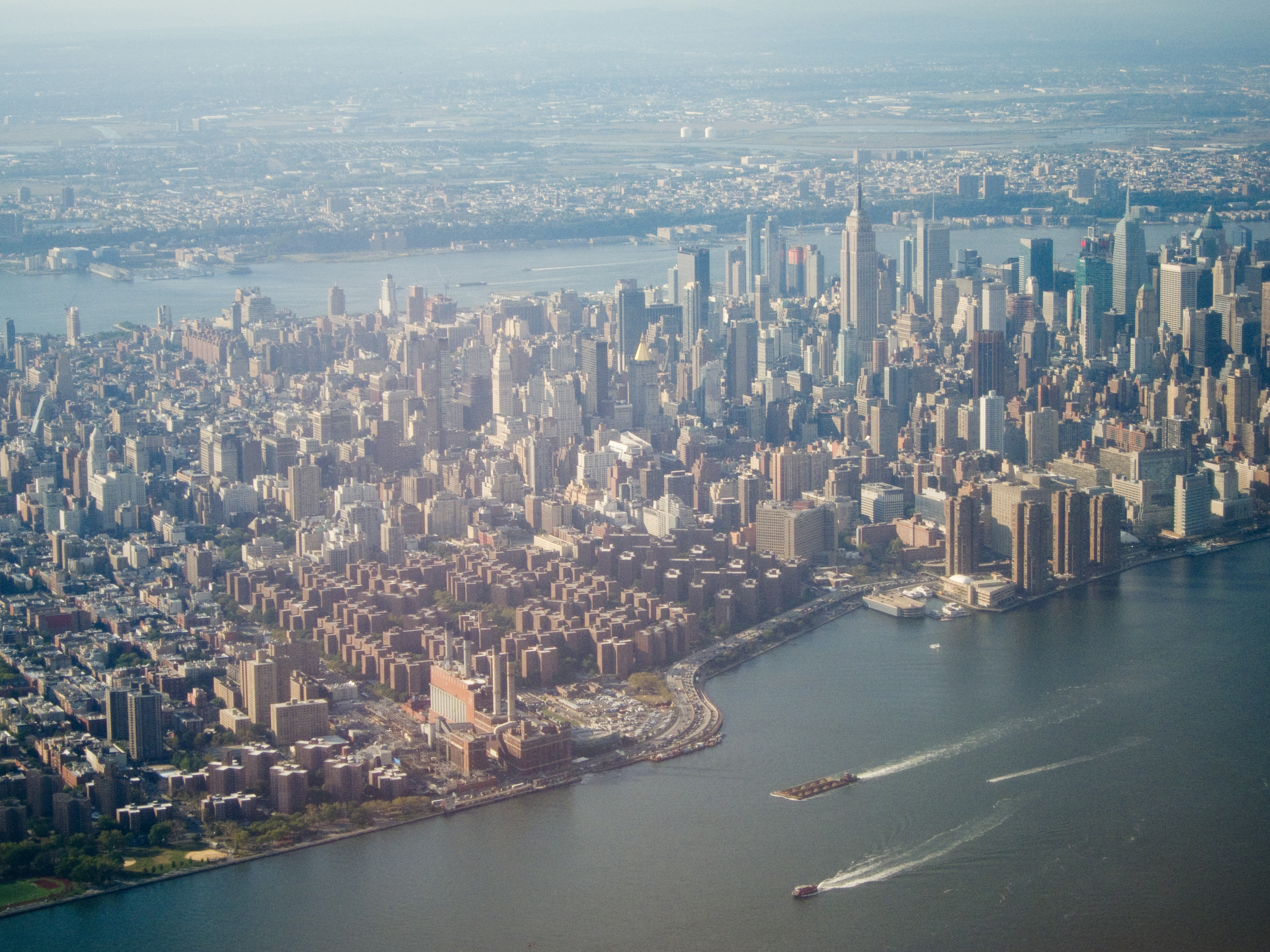
Aerial view in 2014, looking northwest at Manhattan and the site of the project at Stuyvesant Cove

Community Board 6 opposed the scale of River Walk as being too large in relationship to the adjacent residential areas. Although it expressed a willingness to work with Related Companies and PDC to scale down the project, the developer began to avoid meeting with the community board as the plans were advanced and were unwilling to make significant changes. In February 1987, the community board protested the lack of cooperation by voting unanimously to create a resolution calling for the project to be reduced in size and the city create a waterfront park.

In addition to the overall scale of the development, opponents of River Walk also had other concerns about the project, such as its effect on air quality, public schools, traffic and public transportation, shadows, and views of the river from adjacent neighborhoods. Other issues included impacts of the project during its 10-year construction period (particularly the air, dust and noise) and the city and federal tax breaks that had been given to the developers. Jesse Masyr, an attorney representing River Walk, described the local opposition as "a textbook case of N.I.M.B.Y. syndrome."

The elected officials representing the local neighborhood also opposed the project, including: Congressman William Green, State Senator Roy Goodman, State Assemblyman Steve Sanders, and City Councilwomen Miriam Friedlander and Carol Greitzer. Additionally, City Council President Andrew Stein and Manhattan Borough President David Dinkins both announced they would not vote for the project, which they felt was too large; both of them were members of the Board of Estimate, the government body that would have final approval of the project. Community Board 6 Chairman Ed Rubin said, "It's a project nobody wants. Besides the mayor and the developer, I don't know anyone who wants Riverwalk."

With the 1989 mayoral election approaching, when Koch would run for a fourth term as mayor, he withdrew his support of the current plans for the River Walk project in January 1989, indicating that they needed to be scaled down. Koch called for the elimination of the proposed hotel and a reduction in the height of the residential towers. The architects worked with the city to revise the plans to address Koch's concerns. The proposed hotel and convention center were subsequently removed from the project, and its construction duration was reduced to eight years.

Borough President Dinkins used his office's budget to commission a review of a draft version of the project's EIS by environmentalist Barry Commoner. Commoner predicted that combined sewer overflow during heavy rainfalls from the six existing sewer outfalls would get trapped in the web of pilings supporting the platform and create unpleasant odors, saying that the project "might as well be called 'Sewer Walk.'" The development team contested Commoner's assertions, explaining that the project was designed to create two new sewer outfalls to the north and south of the project site, carrying the sewage further out into the river into areas of stronger tidal flows for dispersal, and would also include dredging the portion of the river below the platform to remove the layer of silt that had accumulated over time.

Other elected officials attempted various strategies to prevent River Walk from advancing. In November 1986, State Assemblyman Sanders filed a lawsuit in New York Supreme Court against the project, claiming that it "alienates the occupancy and use" of public land along with waterfront without approval of the state legislature, in violation of the City Charter; the court subsequently refused to block the project from proceeding. A bill was introduced to the State Legislature to require state approval for the leasing of any municipal-owned waterfront property (previously approval was only needed for the sale of such properties). An editorial in New York Newsday speculated that Sanders, along with State Senator Roy Goodman might have used the proposed legislation as a means to gain the favor of their constituents that opposed River Walk. In response to community opposition of the project, U.S. Senator Daniel Patrick Moynihan dropped his support of an amendment to the federal tax code that would have given an exemption to River Walk to preserve depreciation benefits and investment tax credits under the current law, which he had previously inserted per the request of the Koch administration. However, Mayor Koch was still able to get River Walk the exemption with the support of U.S. Representative Thomas Downey from Long Island. Meanwhile, Congressman William Green, who had unsuccessfully fought against giving the federal tax breaks to River Walk, contemplated asking Congress to redesignate the portion of the river that the project site was located on as navigable to restrict potential development.

=== Withdrawal and termination ===
River Walk was certified by the City Planning Commission on December 28, 1989, which meant that the necessary environmental analyses and other documents had been submitted in order for the project to begin the six-month-long review mandated by ULURP. The certification date allowed Related Companies to seek final approval of the proposed project from the Board of Estimate before upcoming revisions to the City Charter would take effect, which would eliminate the Board of Estimate and transfer over most of its responsibilities to the City Council. River Walk was the last project to be certified in the Koch administration, with David Dinkins set to begin his term as mayor at the beginning of 1990. It was one of several major projects in the city that sought certification in the waning days of the Koch administration, with developers thinking that the outgoing members of the City Planning Commission would be more favorable to projects during the pre-certification process compared to the incoming members of the commission under the new Dinkins administration.

Although Dinkins had previously opposed the plans for River Walk while he was Manhattan Borough President, representatives from Related Companies met with his administration in the beginning of February 1990 to negotiate an agreement to advance the project. In exchange for responding to the concerns voiced by the Dinkins administration—which included reductions to the number of residential units and size of the platform, making improvements to the park, and moving parking spaces off the platform—the developer asked for certain considerations, such as making their project a priority and avoiding the need to have to prepare new environmental analyses to address future design changes as a result of subsequent compromises. The two sides got close to reaching an agreement.

However, in March 1990, River Walk's developers withdrew their application, which came at the recommendation of the city after failed efforts to negotiate a compromise. Stanley Davis, a spokesman for Mayor Dinkins, explained, "We felt that the proposed project was too radical, that there was nothing they could offer that would fall under ULURP. In effect, we asked them to withdraw it." Robert A. M. Stern and the co-authors of his 2006 book New York 2000 suggested that Related Companies' decision to withdraw the project might have been associated with the effects of the stock market crash in 1987 on the real estate market. Although an announcement that the project had been withdrawn was made before Community Board 6 was set to vote on River Walk, the board still decided to vote against the project. Community Board 6 Chairman Steve Rosen said, "We're on the record—and still wary. This is not the last development that will be proposed on that site."

In 1991, PDC was merged into the city's newly-formed Economic Development Corporation (EDC). With plans for River Walk on hold, the developer had some discussions with EDC about bringing back the project. In 1992, Manhattan Borough President Ruth Messinger released a draft plan for the Manhattan waterfront with recommendations for taking the first steps for the development of a continuous greenway around the island. One of these recommendations involved "terminating" the developer of the River Walk site as it continued to hold development rights. Later that year, EDC, de-designated Related Companies as the developer of the site at the recommendation of the Borough President, Community Board 6 and other elected officials.

== Development of waterfront park ==
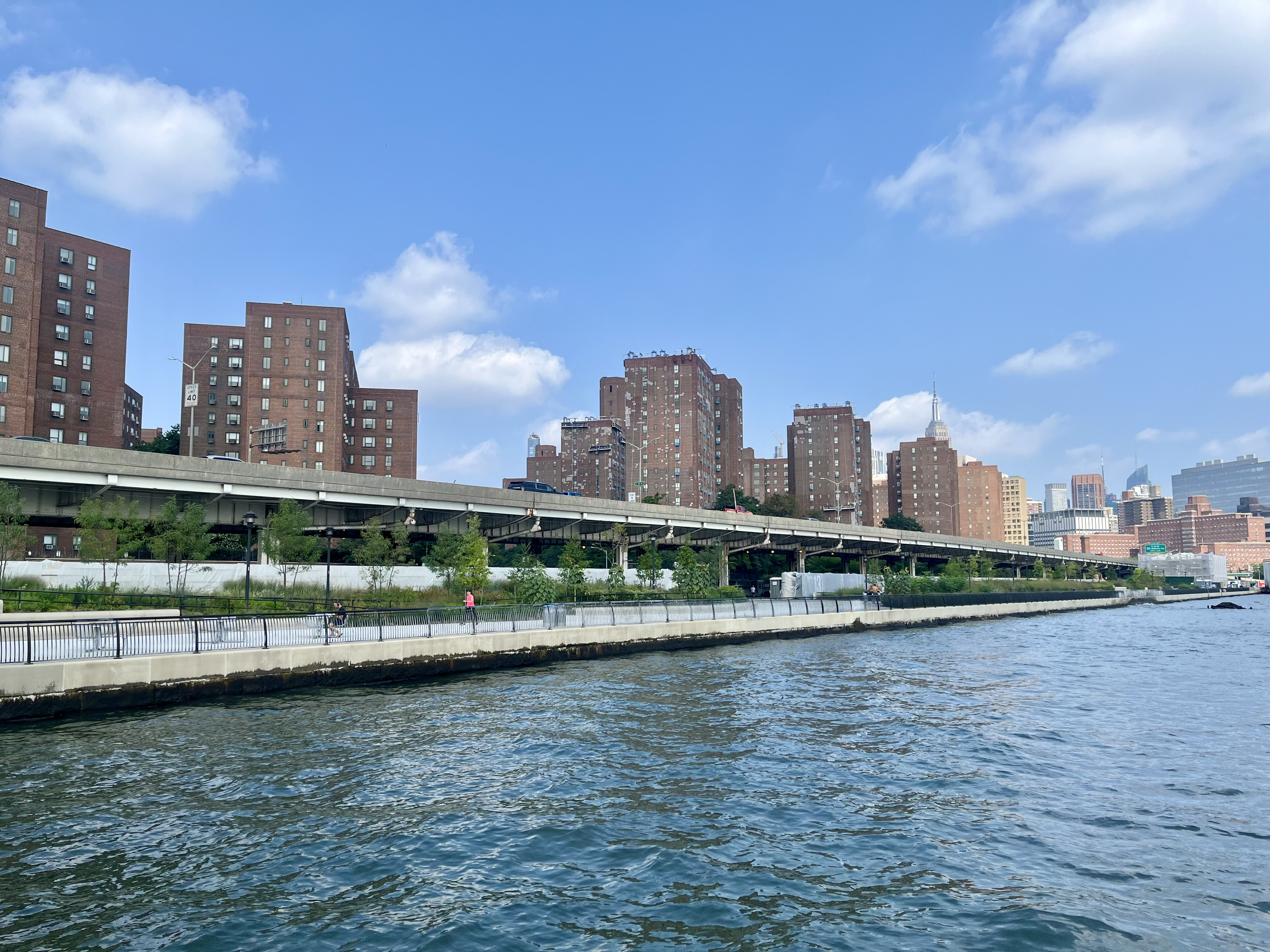
View of Stuyvesant Cove Park in 2024

Community Board 6 subsequently commissioned the preparation of an open space study for the site, which was prepared by the landscape architecture firm of Heintz/Ruddick Associates in collaboration with Karahan/Schwarting Architecture Company. The study included plans for a waterfront park with an esplanade and bike path, a restaurant and ice skating rink on the roof of the existing parking garage at the Skyport Marina, a boathouse for kayaks, and two barges for recreational activities.

Advocates for a new waterfront park from CUAR formed a new group called the Stuyvesant Cove Park Association, which obtained federal, state, and city funding to finance the construction of the new park.

Stuyvesant Cove Park, which was completed in 2002, cost $8.3 million and was designed by Donna Walcavage Landscape Architecture. Solar 1, an environmental learning center with a small outdoor stage for public performances, opened at the north end of the park in 2003, and was intended to be replaced by a larger facility in the future.
