= Thirteenth Avenue (Manhattan) =

Street in Manhattan, New York

Coordinates: 40.74°N 74.01140°W

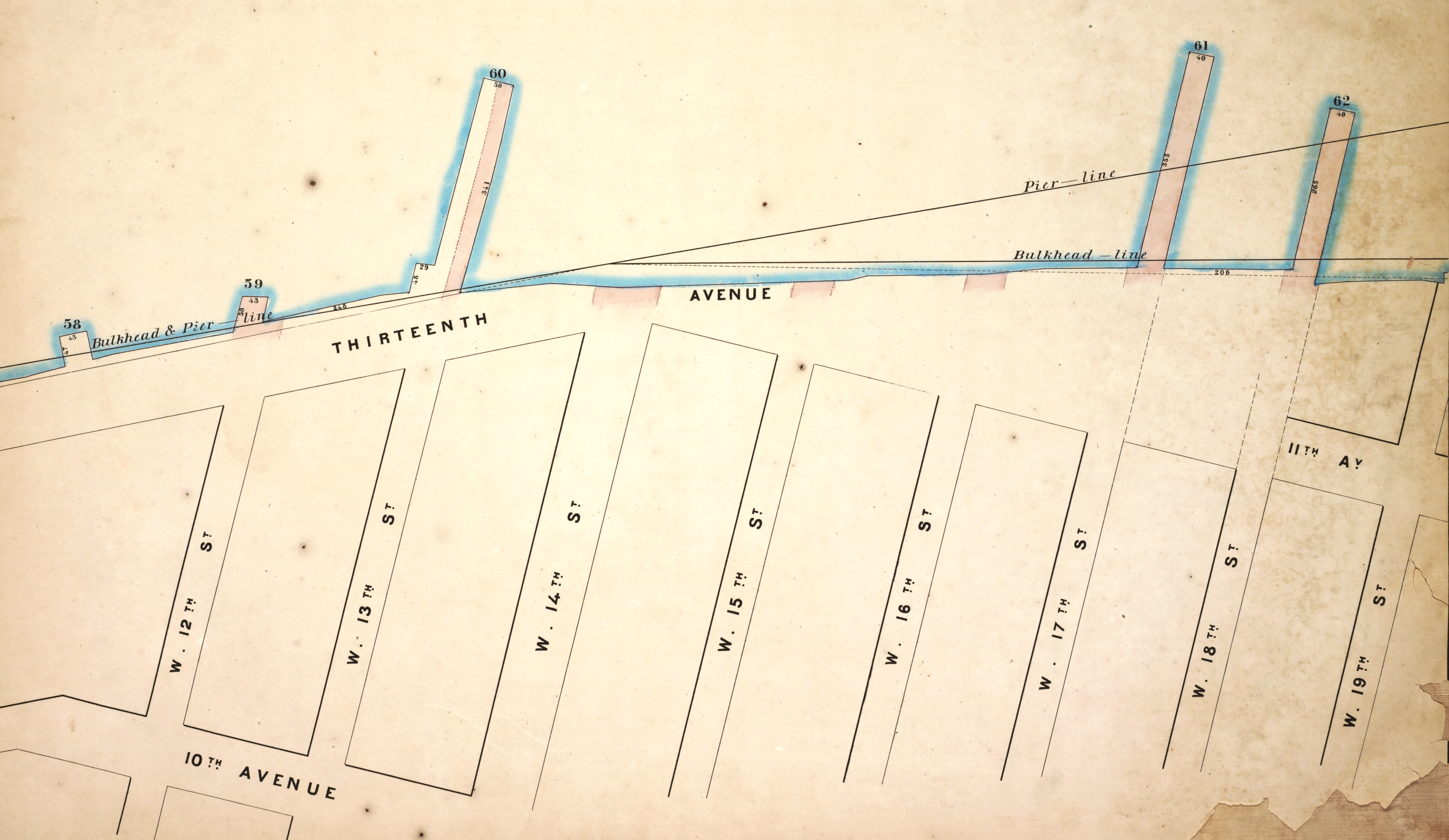
1860 map showing Thirteenth Avenue between West 12th and West 19th Streets

Thirteenth Avenue was a street in the New York City borough of Manhattan, New York City. It was built in 1837 along the Hudson River. The avenue was later removed in the early 20th century to make way for the Chelsea Piers.

== History ==
Thirteenth Avenue was built in 1837 on landfill along the Hudson River, becoming the westernmost avenue in downtown and lower-midtown Manhattan. An 1891 map published by G. W. Bromley shows Thirteenth Avenue heading north from 11th Street to around 29th Street, where it merged into 12th Avenue.

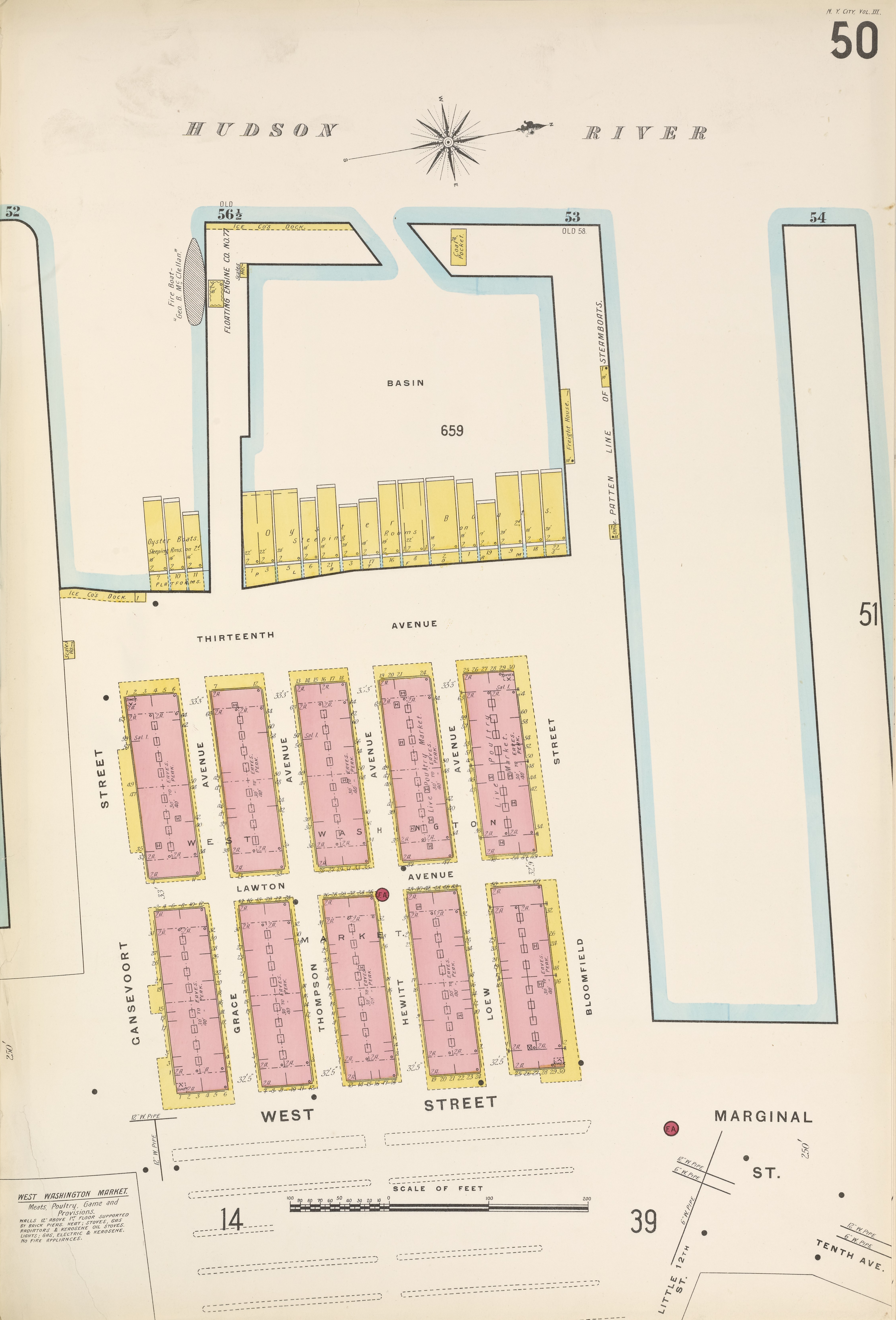
West Washington Market on the Gansevoort Peninsula, on a map published in 1904

In the early 20th century, New York wanted to build longer piers along the Hudson to accommodate bigger ships such as the RMS Lusitania and the RMS Titanic. However, the United States government, which controls the bulkhead line, refused to allow longer piers to be built. The shipping companies were reluctant to build longer piers further uptown because existing infrastructure such as the tracks of the New York Central Railroad and the 23rd Street ferry station were already in place downtown. To solve this problem, the city took the unusual step of removing the section of landfill on which Thirteenth Avenue ran south of 22nd Street so the Chelsea Piers could be constructed to handle the liners.

A small section of the landfill north of Gansevoort Street, the West Washington Market, was left as an exception, becoming what was known as the "Gansevoort Peninsula", later the location of a salt-storage facility of the New York City Department of Sanitation, across West Street from Gansevoort Street. The small space between Gansevoort Street and Bloomfield Street, and the approximate place where Thirteenth Avenue once ran, was used as a parking lot for garbage trucks and employees' vehicles. An adjacent stretch of cobblestone is all that remains of the original Thirteenth Avenue, which has apparently been de-mapped by the city. It does not appear on the official Geographic Information System map. Proposals have been made for a sandy beach, or for a garbage transfer pier.

== Conversion of Gansevoort Peninsula into a park ==
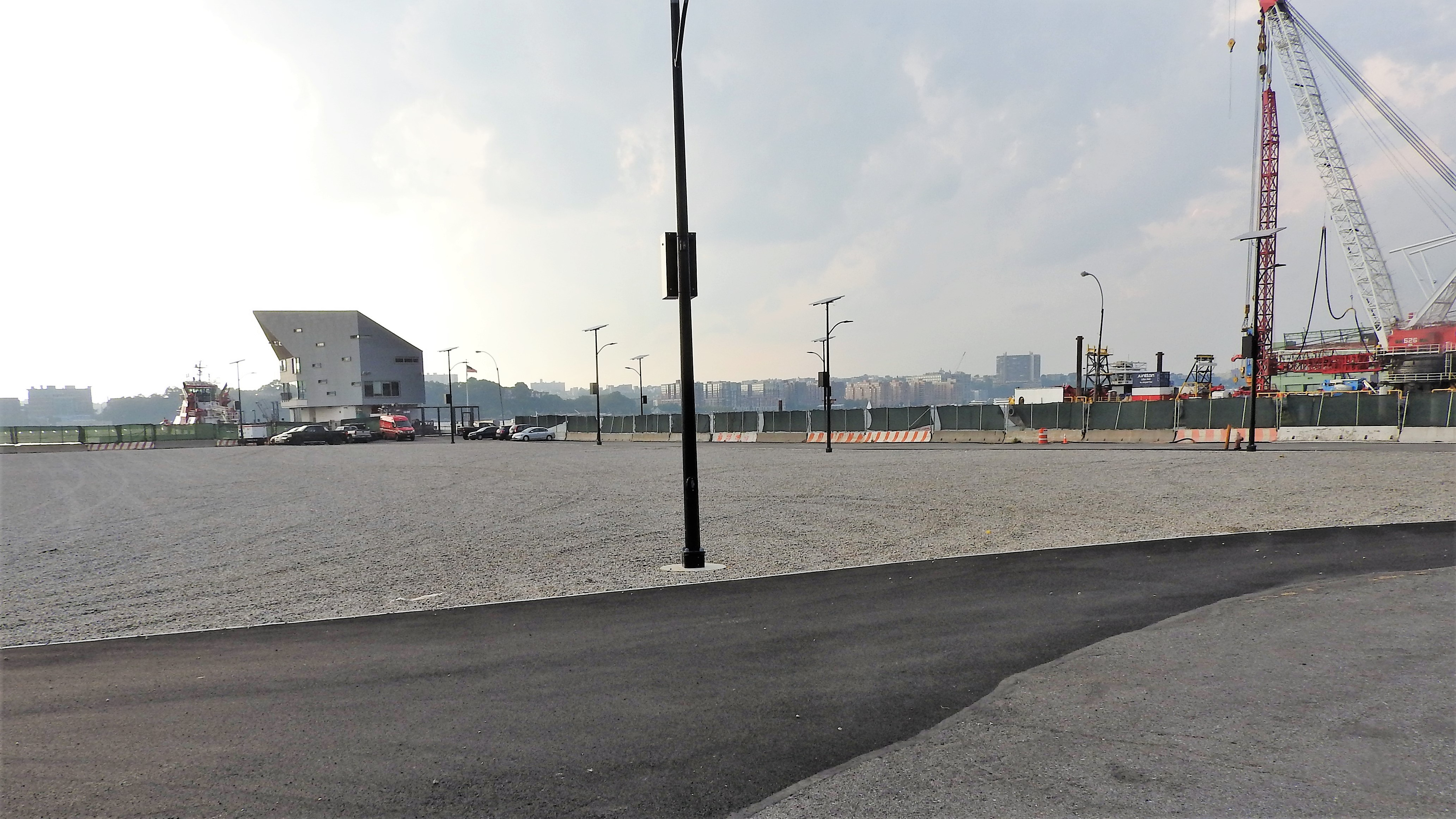
Gansevoort Peninsula cleared (2018)

In 2016, the city began demolishing the Department of Sanitation building as part of a plan for the creation of a new public park on the land. In January 2019, it was announced that the 5.5-acre (2.2 ha) park – which was to be developed by the Hudson River Park Trust – would be designed by James Corner Field Operations, which designed the High Line elevated park in Manhattan and Domino Park in Brooklyn. The space would include a public art project to be commissioned by the Whitney Museum, and Manhattan's first public beach. The construction of the park, which would serve as a green space, was expected to take two years. The construction was funded by New York state, New York City, and private interests, as well as $152 million secured by the Trust through the sale of air rights. The 4-mile (6.4 km) long, 550-acre (220 ha), Hudson River Park. Hudson River Park, which is located on the Gansevoort Peninsula, between Gansevoort Street and Little West 12th Street, in the Meatpacking District, across from the Whitney Museum of American Art, between Gansevoort and Little West 12th streets, which affords it remarkable views of the Lower Manhattan skyline.

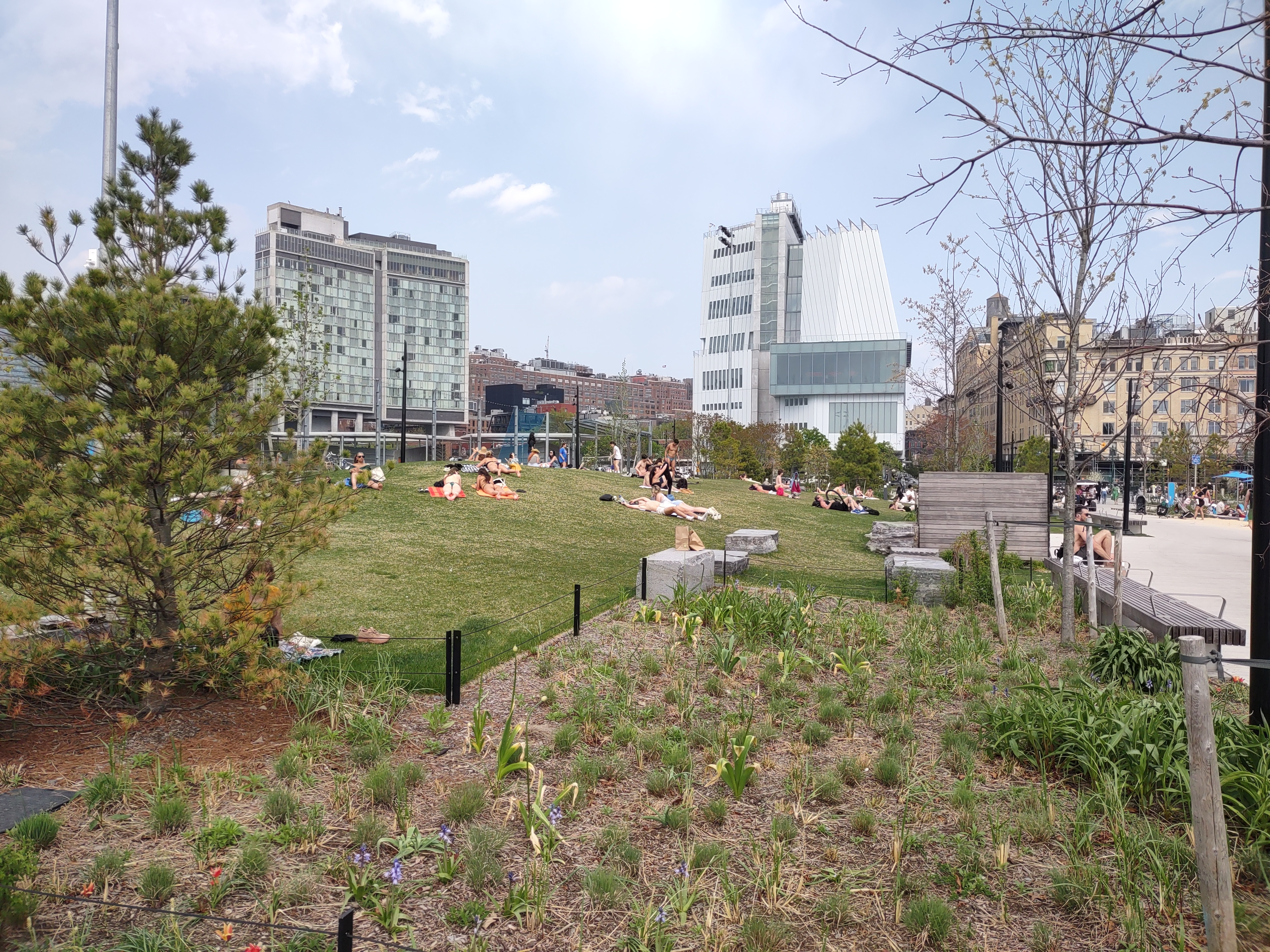
Park, 2024

The $73 million park includes a beach with 1,200 short tons (1,100 long tons) of sand. It opened on October 2, 2023. It amenities include a sports field, sunning lawn, promenades, two dog runs, a picnic area, fitness equipment, and a beachfront kayak launch for non-motorized boats, although swimming and wading are not permitted. Gansevoort Peninsula was advertised as having "the first public beachfront in Manhattan", though The New York Times wrote that there were other small beaches on Manhattan island, including in Fort Washington Park and near Spuyten Duyvil Creek.

== Gallery ==
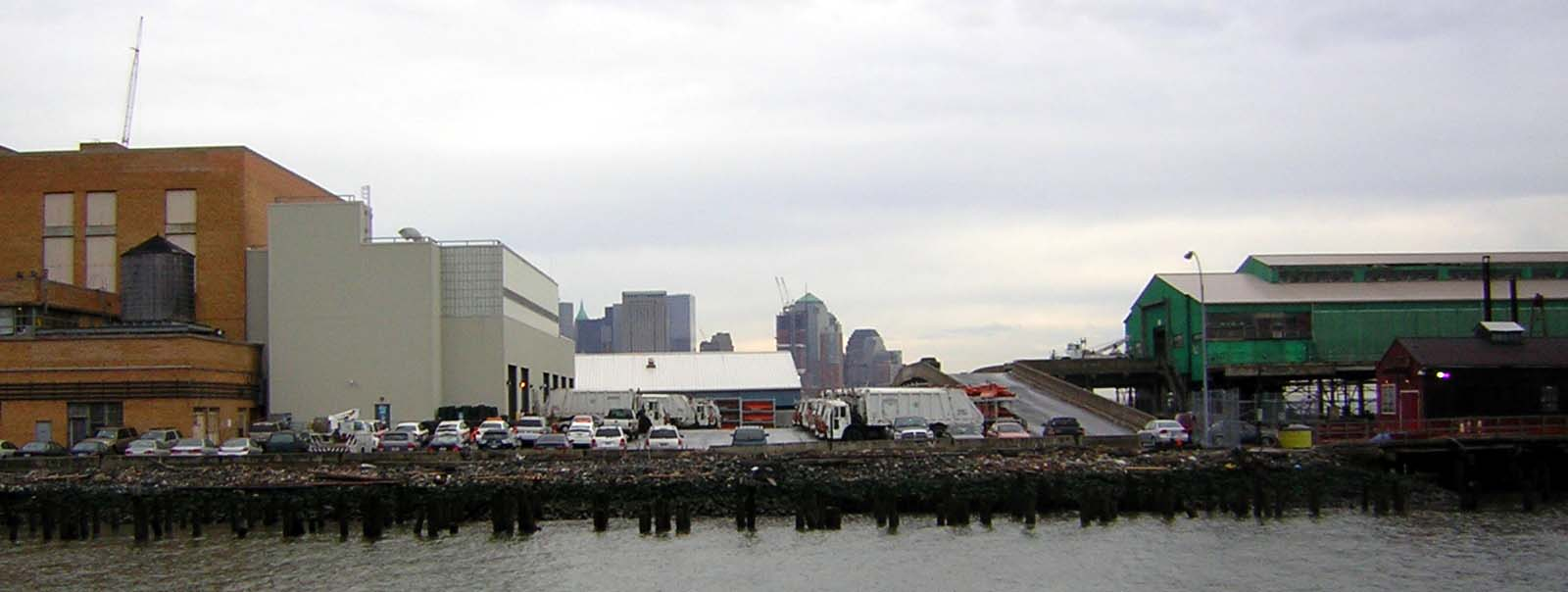
13th Avenue as seen from the north in 2008, with World Financial Center in background
