= Chelsea Piers =

Entertainment complex in Manhattan, New York

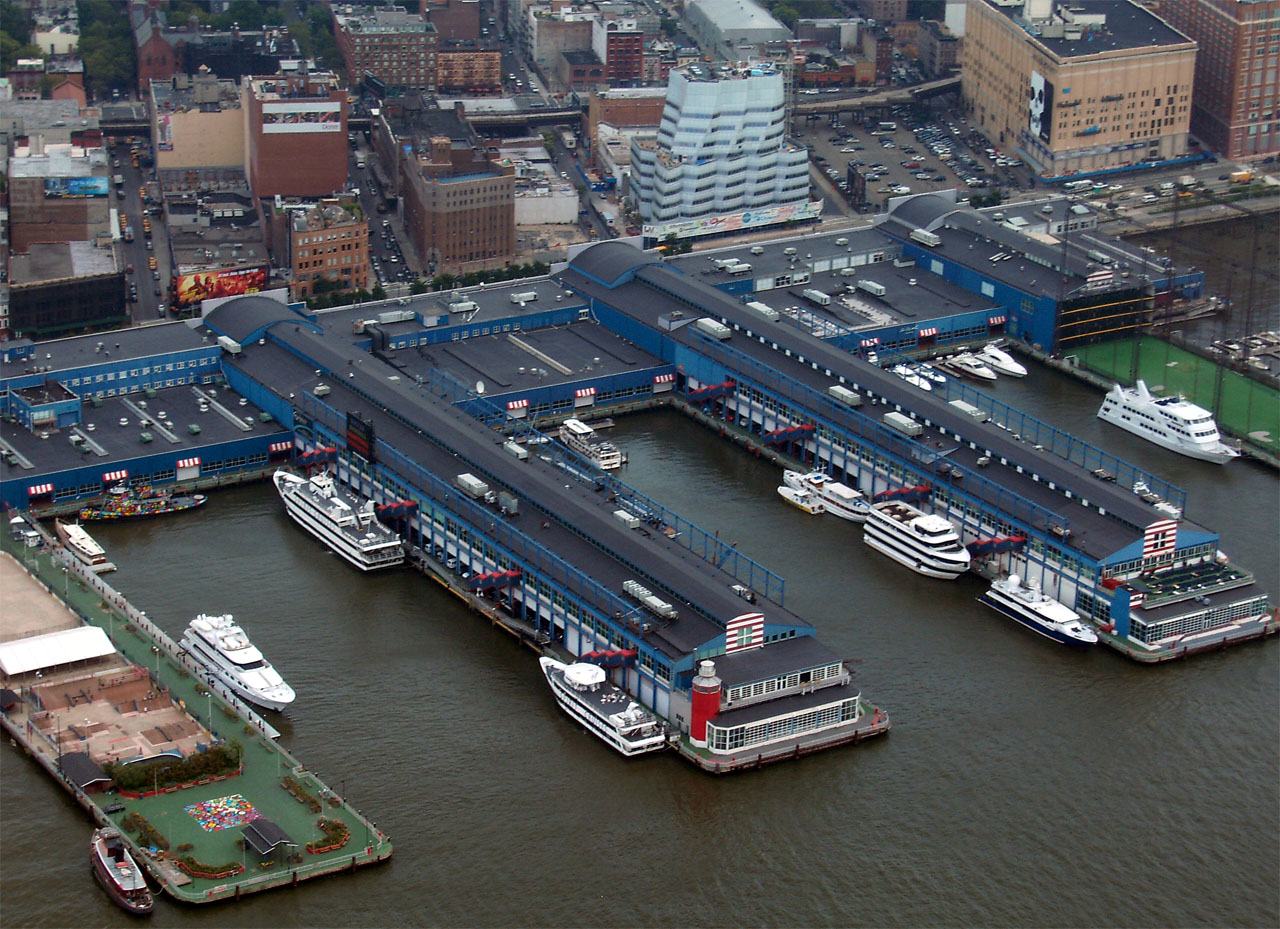
- Chelsea Piers as seen from the air. Starting from the right are Pier 59 (driving range partially visible), progressing to the enclosed structures of Pier 60 and Pier 61, ending at the left with Pier 62 (skate park partially visible).
- Interactive map of Chelsea Piers
- Full name: Chelsea Piers Sports & Entertainment Complex
- Address: Piers 59-62 Chelsea Piers; New York City, NY
- Coordinates: 40°44′48″N 74°00′37″W
- Type: Sports complex

Construction
- Architect: Warren and Wetmore

Website
- chelseapiers.com

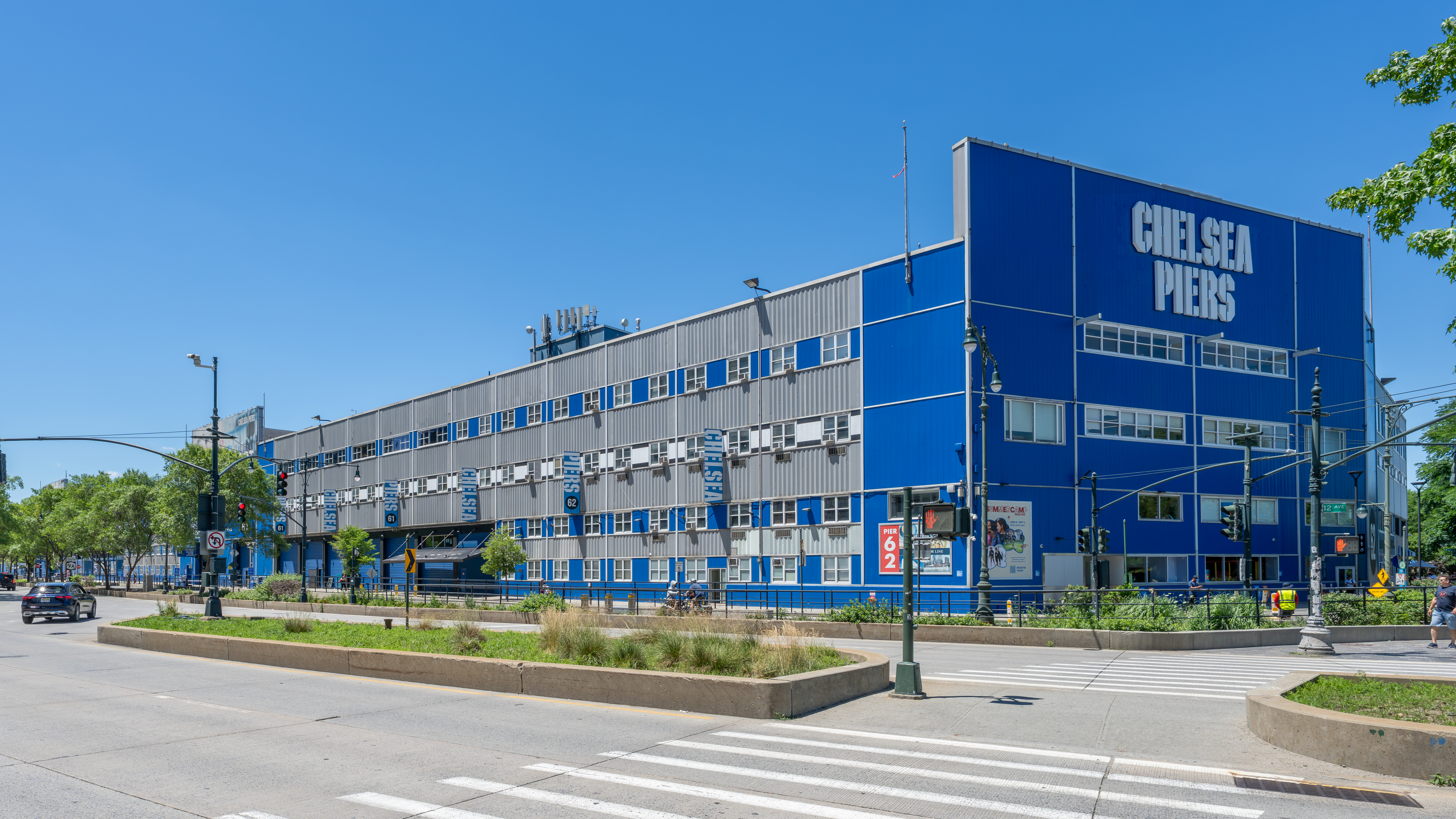
Chelsea Piers from the West Side Highway

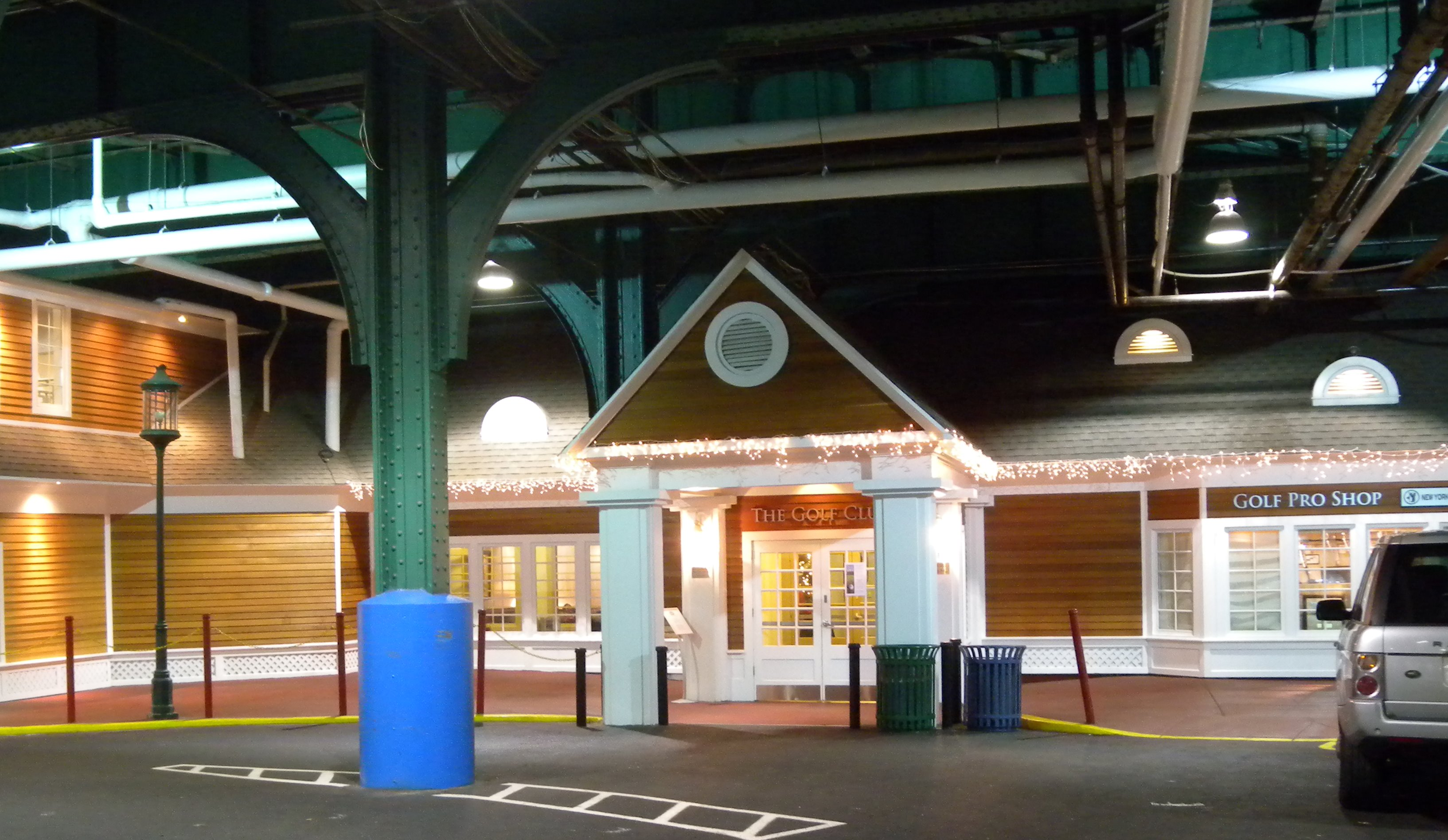
Golf club entrance

Chelsea Piers is a series of piers in Chelsea, on the West Side of Manhattan in New York City. Located to the west of the West Side Highway (Eleventh Avenue) and Hudson River Park and to the east of the Hudson River, they were originally a passenger ship terminal in the early 1900s that was used by RMS Lusitania and was the destination of RMS Carpathia after rescuing the survivors of RMS Titanic. The piers replaced a variety of run-down waterfront structures with a row of grand buildings embellished with pink granite facades.

The piers are currently used by the Chelsea Piers Sports & Entertainment Complex. The Complex is a 28-acre waterfront sports village located between 17th and 23rd Streets along Manhattan's Hudson River. This privately financed project opened in 1995. Situated on Piers 59, 60 and 61, and in the head house connecting them, the complex features the Golf Club, a multi-story driving range, the Field House, which contains numerous sports and training facilities, Sky Rink, which has two full-sized ice rinks, the Chelsea Piers Fitness health club, Lucky Strike Entertainment at Chelsea Piers, a bowling alley, and Sunset Terrace, a venue that hosts weddings and other events. The complex also includes: several event centers, the Silver Screen Studios film and television production facilities, and Maritime Center marina, for mooring private boats.

== History ==
=== Development and construction ===
Historically, the term Chelsea Piers referred to the ocean liner berths on Manhattan's west side from 1910 to the 1930s. With ocean liners such as Lusitania becoming larger in size, New York City was looking for a new passenger ship dock in the early 1900s. The Army, which controls the location and size of piers, refused to let any piers extend beyond the existing pierhead line of the North River (the navigation name for the Hudson River south of 30th Street). Ship lines were reluctant to build north of 23rd Street because infrastructure was already in place, including the New York Central railway line and a ferry station near the river at 23rd Street.

Part of the waterfront had been infilled in 1837, extending Manhattan to 13th Avenue, but the city government took over the infilled land and converted most of it into piers. The controversial decision included condemning many businesses. The city was unable to condemn the West Washington Street Market, which remained infilled. The market ultimately closed and the dock was converted to a sanitation facility that was used to load garbage barges headed for the Fresh Kills Landfill. The only section of 13th Avenue that remains is behind the sanitation facility, now a parking lot for sanitation trucks. That section is now called the Gansevoort Peninsula.

The new piers were designed by the architectural firm of Warren and Wetmore, which also designed Grand Central Terminal. Under contracts let by the New York City Department of Dock and Ferries, the Chelsea Section Improvement, as it was officially called, replaced a hodgepodge of run-down waterfront structures with a row of grand buildings embellished with pink granite facades and formed the docking points for the rival Cunard and White Star Lines.

=== Early 20th century ===
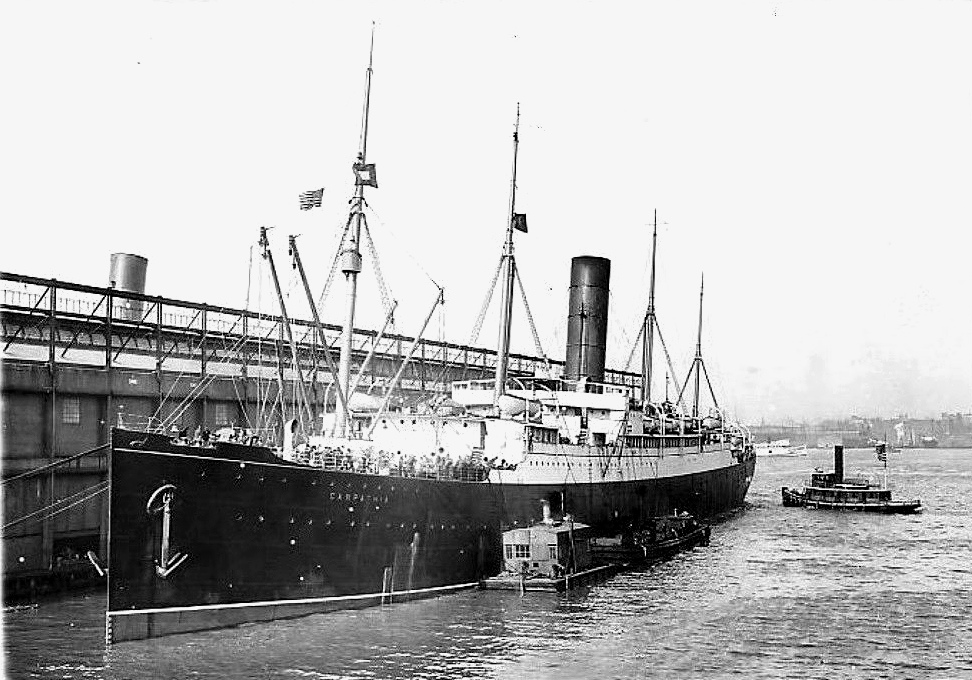
RMS Carpathia at Pier 54 after the RMS Titanic rescue

Most of the major trans-Atlantic liners of the day docked at the piers and they played pivotal roles in the Titanic and Lusitania disasters. The two most memorable moments for the pier were with Lusitania and Titanic. In 1912, Titanic was destined for the White Star pier 59 when she sank. Survivors were rescued on Cunard's RMS Carpathia. Carpathia disembarked Titanic's lifeboats at Pier 59 before going back south to Pier 54, where she unloaded the passengers and survivors. Thousands of people assembled at the dock to greet the ship. Lusitania left her Cunard Pier 54 in 1915 before being torpedoed by German submarine U-20.

In the summer of 1920, a dramatic rally was organized on July 31 at the White Star Line docks. This was to send off Daniel Mannix, the Irish born Archbishop of Melbourne, Australia who had been outspoken on the English rule in Ireland, and successfully led anti conscription campaigns during WW1. A reported 15,000 New Yorkers turned up at Pier 60 at the foot of West 20th street to make sure British Prime Minister Lloyd George would allow Mannix passage to Ireland.

A luxury liner row was built between West 44th and West 52nd Street to handle larger liners in the 1930s. After New York moved its luxury liner piers to the New York Cruise Terminal between West 46th and West 54th Street in 1935 to accommodate bigger ships such as the RMS Queen Mary and the SS Normandie, the Chelsea piers became a cargo terminal. In World War II the piers were used to deploy troops. The piers had catastrophic fires in 1932 and 1947 that destroyed some of the south piers New construction resulted in new cargo piers used by the United States Lines and Grace line.

In July 1936, Jesse Owens and the United States Olympic team departed on the SS Manhattan from Pier 60 for the Summer Games in Berlin, Germany.

=== Late 20th century ===
In the 1980s, plans circulated to replace the West Side Elevated Highway with an at grade highway going along the West Side south of 42nd Street. The plan called for the highway to run over demolished piers. The superstructure of Pier 54 was demolished in 1991 except for the archway entrance (along with the White Star and Cunard signage). The plan (dubbed the Westway) was abandoned after court cases said the new highway would jeopardize striped bass.

Following the demise of Westway, development of the West Side Highway evolved into two parts: a public/private partnership that evolved into the upper piers being used for recreational purposes. The southern piers are now part of the Hudson River Park while the northern piers make up the Chelsea Piers Sports & Entertainment Complex. Construction of the complex began on July 12, 1994, in ceremonies attended by New York Governor Mario Cuomo, New York City Mayor Rudy Giuliani, and Manhattan Borough President Ruth Messinger. The complex opened in August 1995.

After the collapse of the World Trade Center due to the September 11 attacks, EMS triage centers were quickly relocated and consolidated at the Chelsea Piers and the Staten Island Ferry Whitehall Terminal. The EMS triage center was shut down and disassembled on September 12, 2001, due to a lack of need. An ad hoc volunteer disaster recovery site was run from Chelsea Piers through September 16, 2001. Volunteers assisted with resources for ground zero recovery volunteers: sleeping area, food, and cell phones.

Chelsea Piers Connecticut, the first expansion project of Chelsea Piers, was built in Stamford, Connecticut. The facility opened in July 2012.

== Piers 54/55 ==
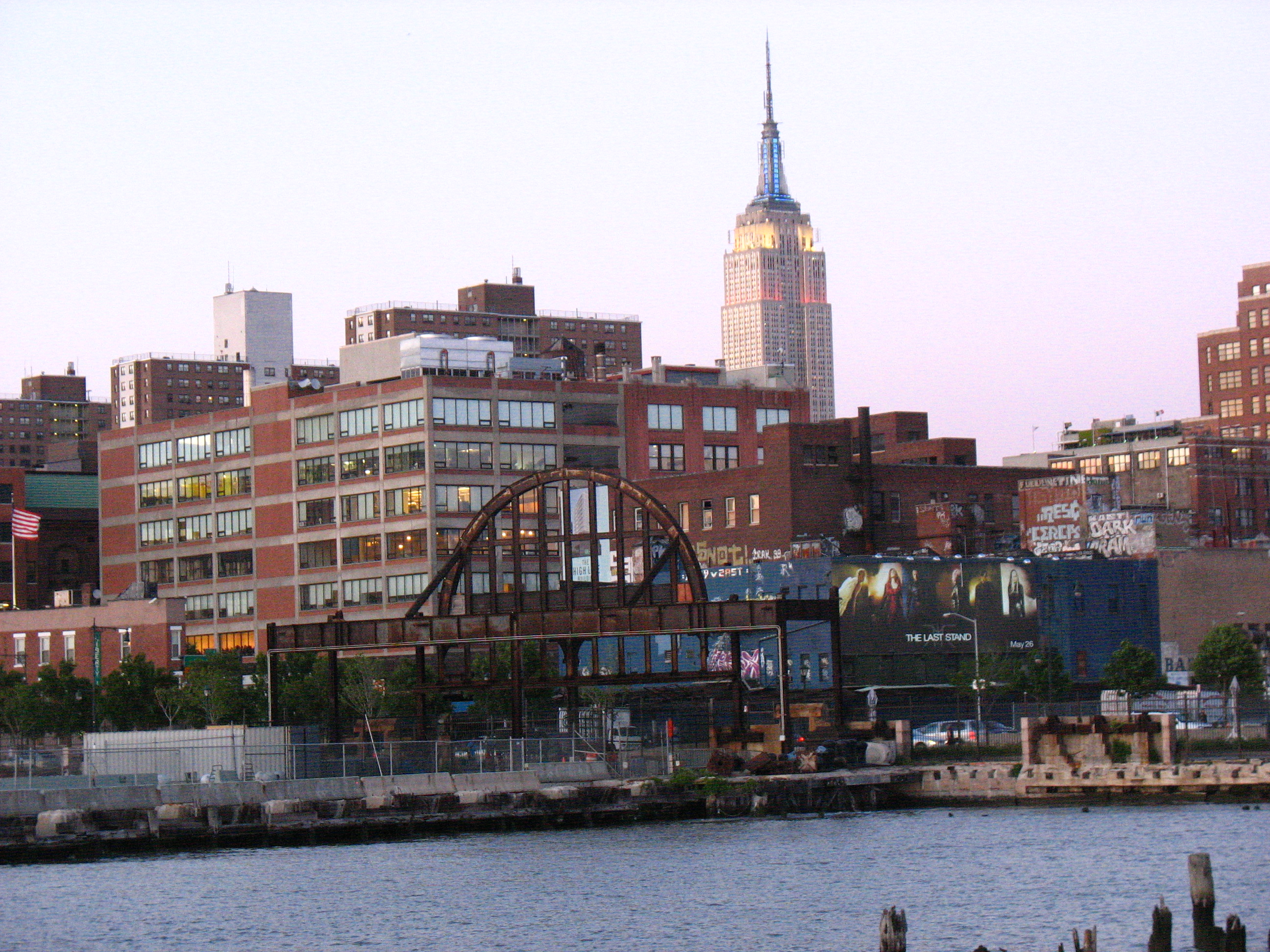
The archway is the only remaining identifiable piece of Pier 54

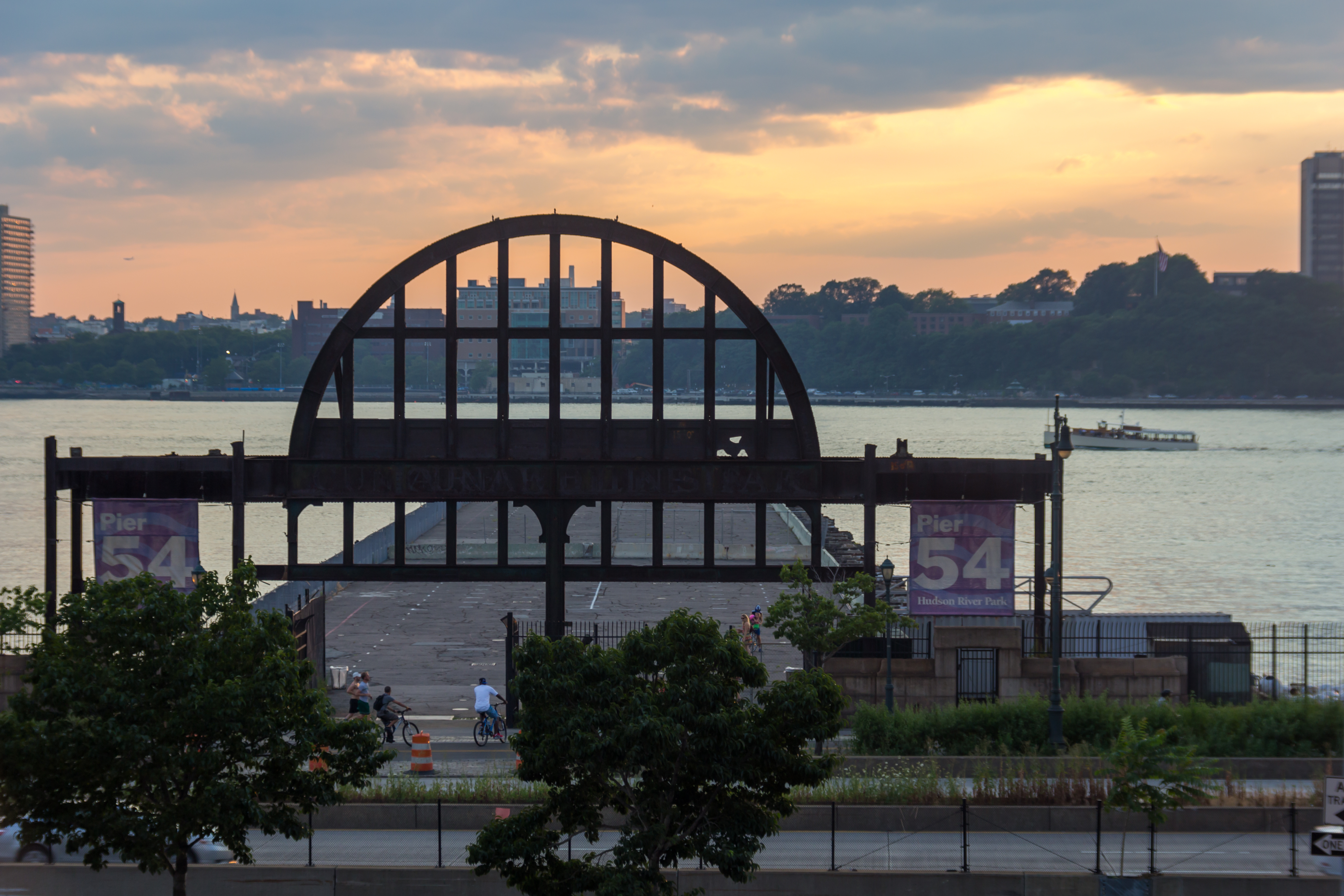
Pier 54 in 2012

Pier 54 at 40°44′29″N 74°0′36″W, part of the historic Chelsea Piers, is associated with the 1912 Titanic and 1915 Lusitania maritime disasters, when it was used by the Cunard Line. It is now part of Hudson River Park. The piers themselves are at Little West 12th Street and the Hudson River in the Meatpacking District/Greenwich Village neighborhood. The pier was also used for troop ships during World War II. After the war it was used as part of the W. R. Grace and Company and United States Lines freight operations.

In 1998 the piers became part of the Hudson River Park. Since then, they have been used for concerts and other events. In 2005, it was the site of The Nomadic Museum's art exhibit housed in shipping containers. Pier 54 was finally shut down in 2011 after it started to collapse.

In the late 2010s and early 2020s, a park called Little Island was built on the site of piers 54 and 55. Plans for the park, originally known as Pier 55, were announced in November 2014. The plans were scrapped in 2017 due to legal trouble and cost overruns. In October 2017, the park plan was revived, and construction of the structure began in April 2018. It was opened on May 21, 2021.

== In popular culture ==
The Chelsea Piers, as a landmark, have been featured in films and televisions shows.

Movies featuring the Chelsea Piers include:

- The 1980 cult film Times Square, notably in the sequence in which Pamela and Nicki escape from the psychiatric hospital and hide out at Pier 56
- The 2001 film Serendipity includes a scene at the Chelsea Piers Golf Club, in which the character played by John Cusack burns off his frustrations by hitting a bucket of balls at the driving range.
- The 2010 film The Other Guys depicts a high-speed chase through the piers, including a helicopter landing on the Golf Club's driving range.
- In the 2006 film The Devil Wears Prada, Pier 59 is mentioned as a fashion shoot location by one of the main protagonists.

Television shows featuring the Chelsea Piers include:

- The Apprentice filmed three episodes at Chelsea Piers, including 2 finales.
- Pier 54 was the site for MTV's reality television program Band in a Bubble, in which the band Cartel was placed inside a large "bubble" enclosure built on the pier. There, the band wrote and recorded a new album in 20 days while under constant surveillance. Webcams placed strategically inside the building broadcast, via internet, live images of the band's movements and progress.

=== Production studios ===
In addition to the Chelsea Piers appearing as themselves in film and television, the Silver Screen Studios, with five sound stages and associated office and production space, starting from the head house at the Pier 62 end of the complex, have been used for films, television shows, commercials and music videos, including:

- Shows in the Law & Order franchise have been filmed at the Silver Screen Studios soundstages in Chelsea Piers, with sets for police and district attorney offices built on site. The original Law & Order, and spinoff Law & Order: Criminal Intent, were produced on stages here for their entire runs. When the original series was cancelled in 2010, Law & Order: Special Victims Unit moved into the space. On September 14, 2004, a road leading to Pier 62 was renamed "Law & Order Way".
- The first four seasons of Spin City were shot in studio D on Chelsea Piers.

Chelsea Piers has also served as the broadcast headquarters for CBS Sports Network.

== Gallery ==
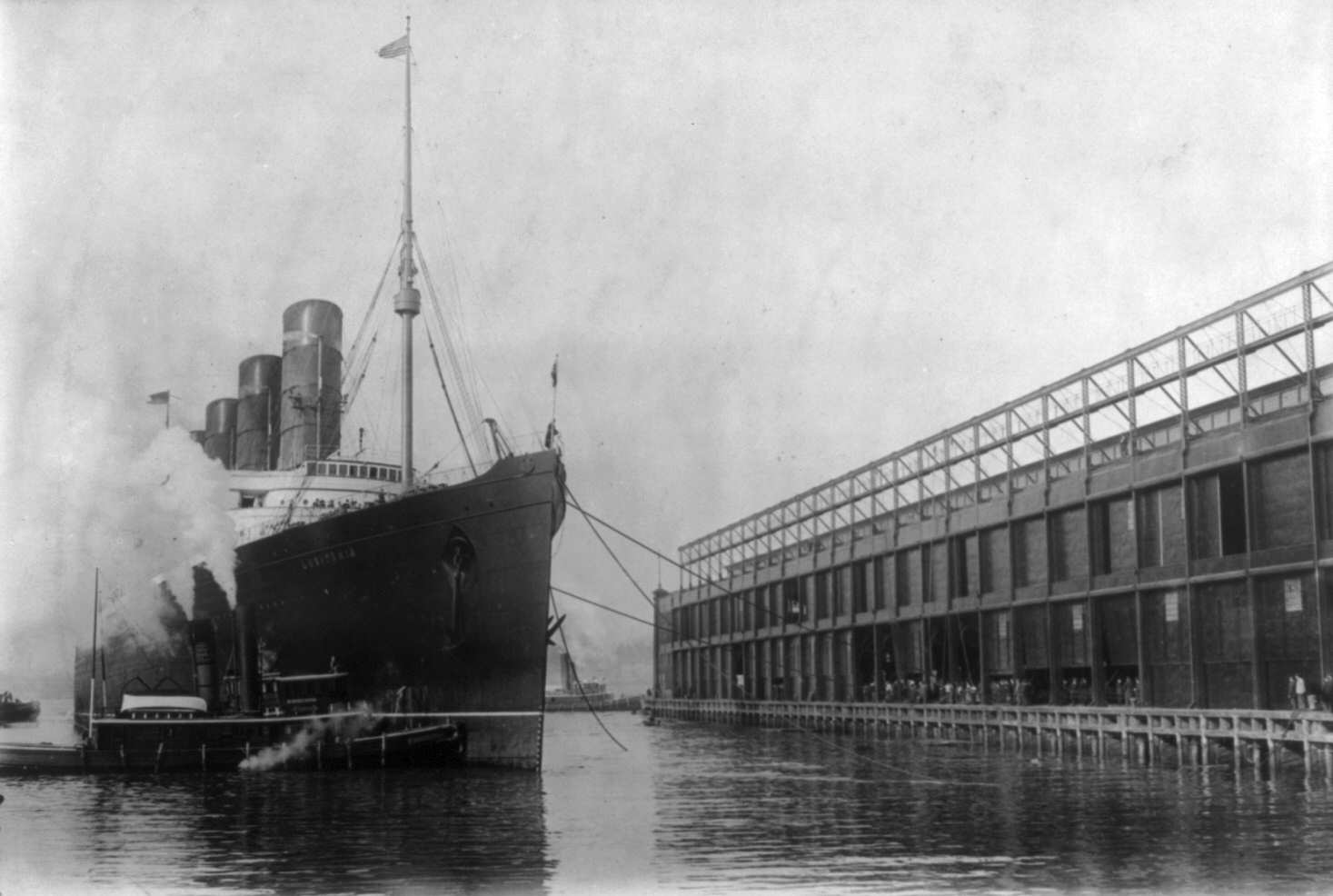
RMS Lusitania at Pier 54

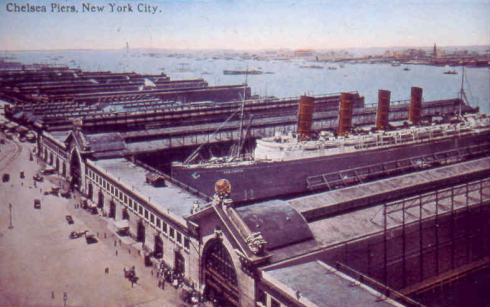
Chelsea Piers and Lusitania about 1910

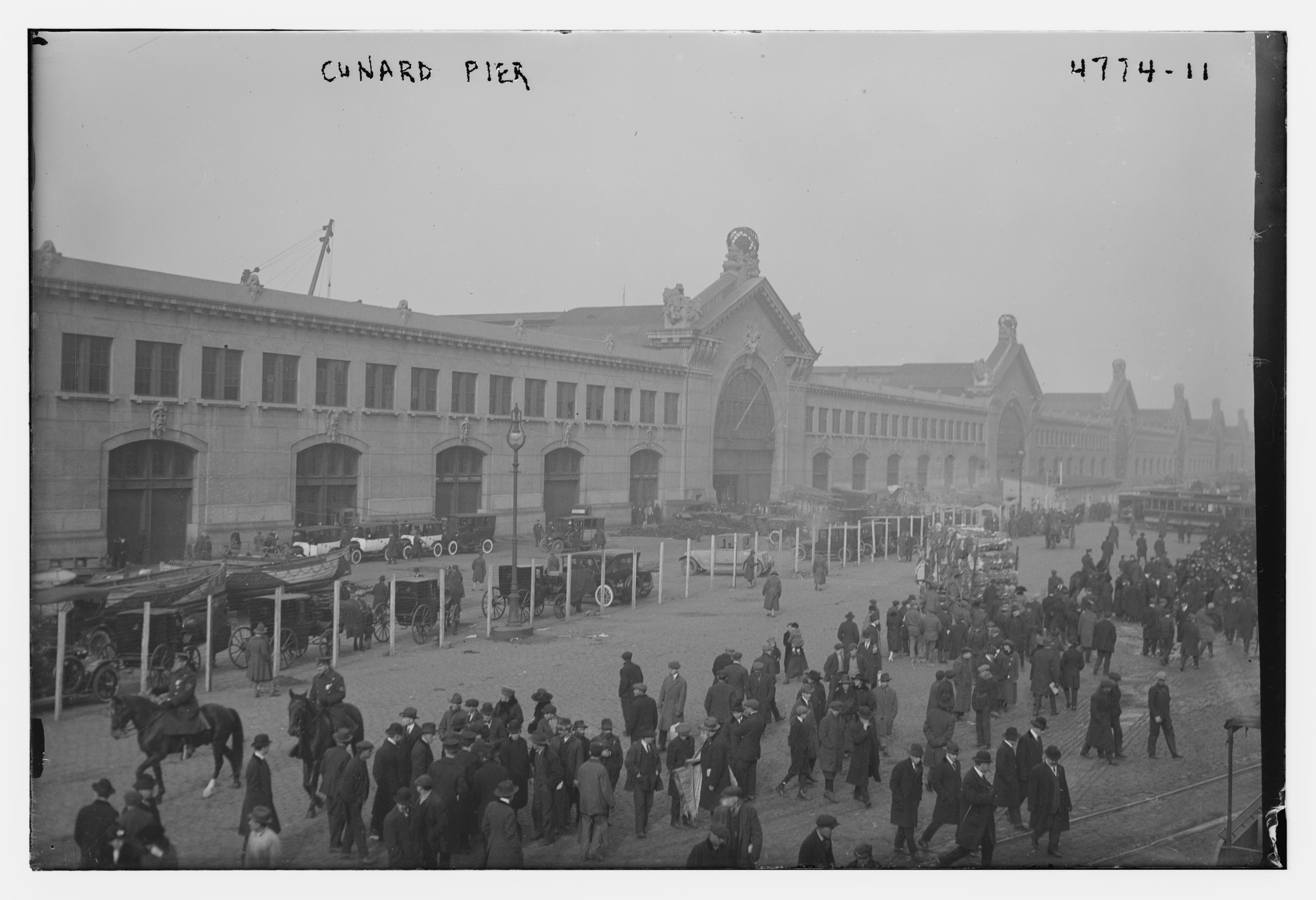
People waiting for the ocean liner RMS Mauretania at the Cunard Pier in New York City which was returning with American aviators and other troops from Europe after World War I on December 2, 1918

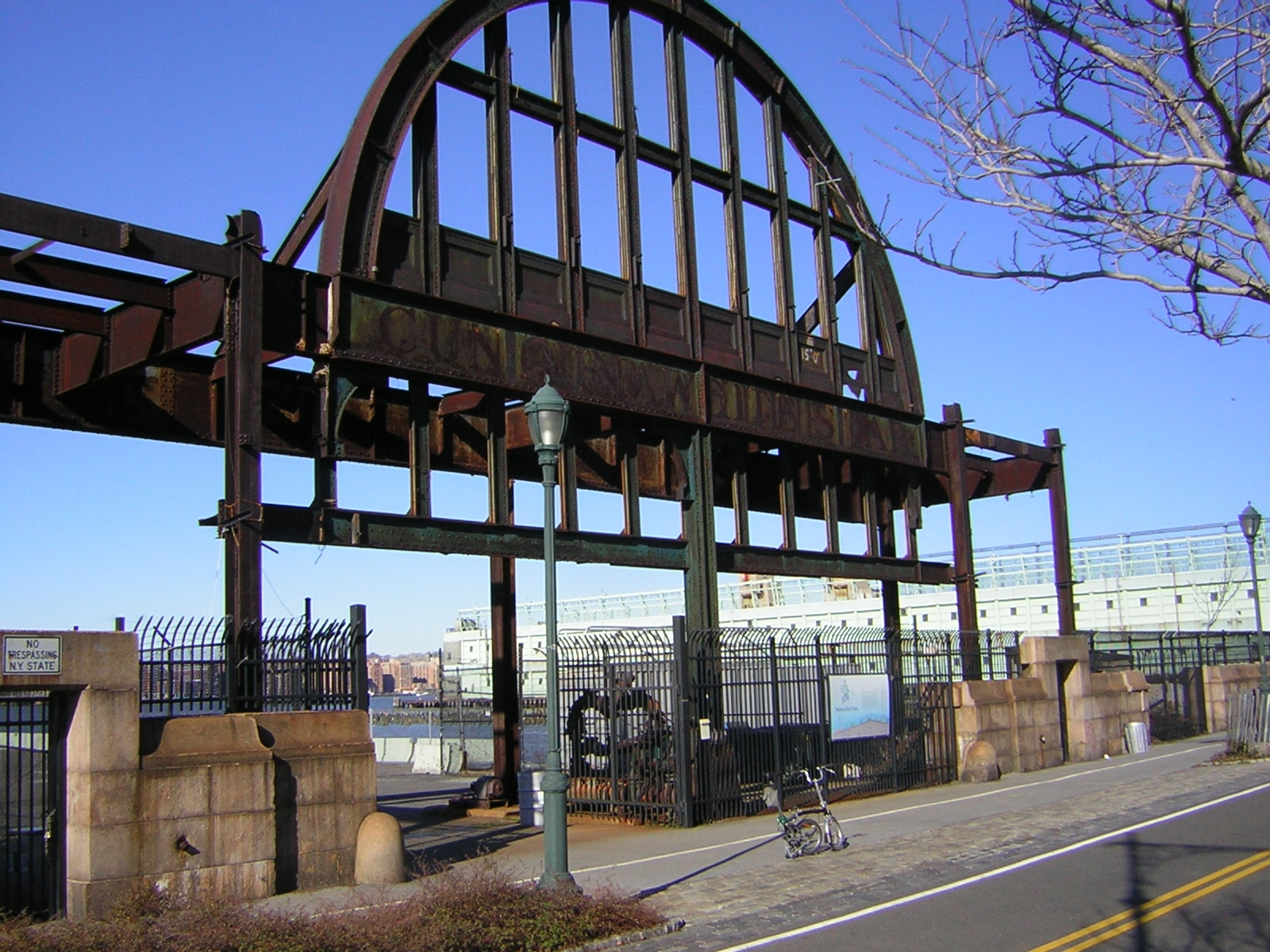
The archway of Cunard Pier 54

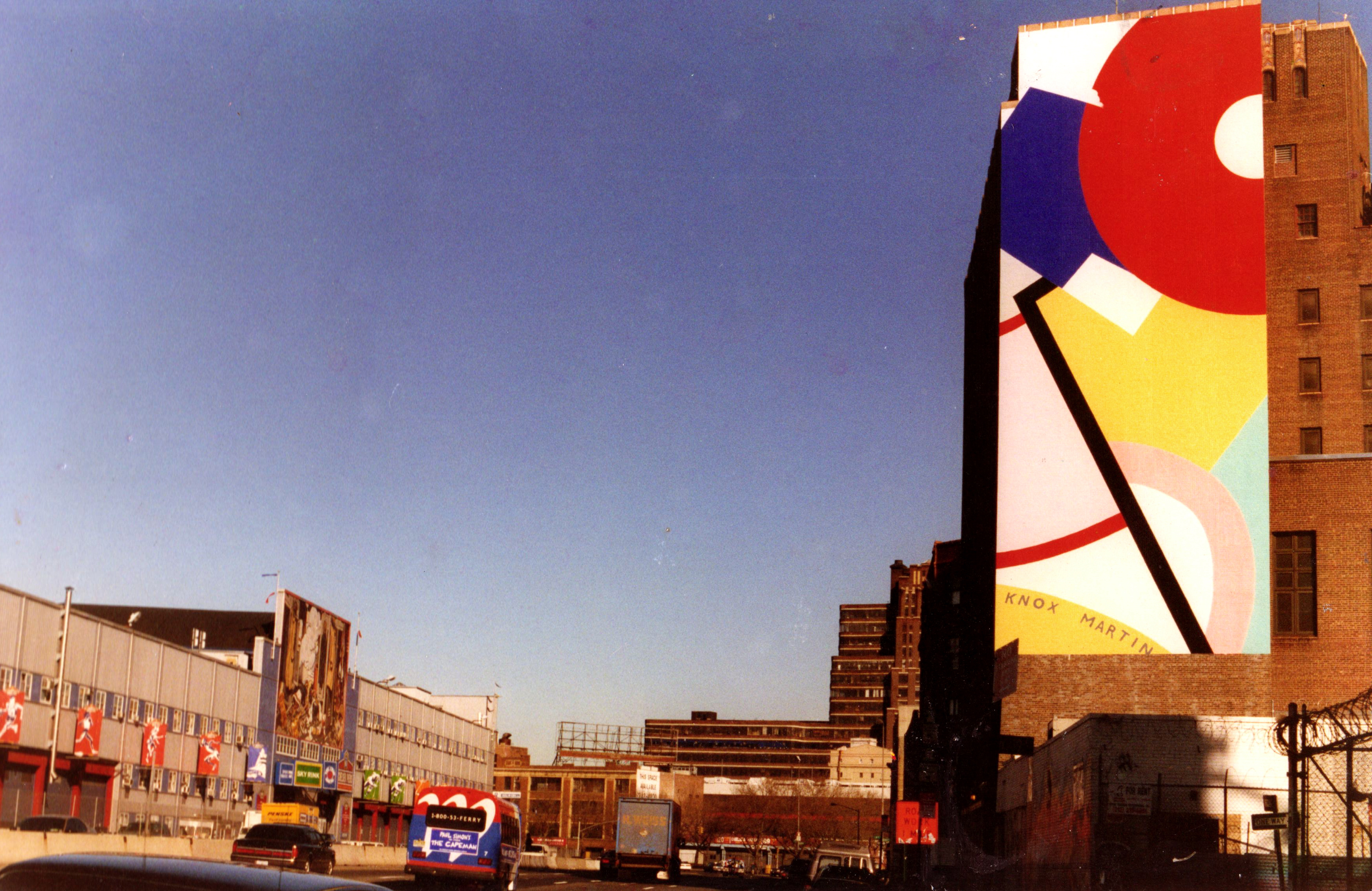
View of Chelsea Piers and Venus Mural
