= Charles Moerdler =

French-American lawyer (born 1934)

Board Member of the MTA
- Incumbent
- Assumed office December 7, 2010
- Appointed by: Governor David Paterson

Chair MTA Bridges and Tunnels
- In office December 2016 – May, 2019

NYC Commissioner of Buildings
- In office January 1966 – September 1967
- Appointed by: Mayor John V. Lindsay

Personal details
- Born: November 15, 1934 (age 92) Paris, France
- Party: Republican
- Spouse: Pearl Moerdler
- Children: 3
- Education: Long Island University (B.A.); Fordham University (J.D.)

Charles Gerard Moerdler (born November 15, 1934) is a French-American lawyer who is a partner in the law firm of Stroock & Stroock & Lavan, and has been on the editorial board of the New York Law Journal since 1986. He has served on the Metropolitan Transportation Authority since 2010 as the Chair of Bridges and Tunnels. He has also been active in public service. He has served on the New York City Housing Development Corp, New York City Board of Collective Bargaining and since 1977 has served as the vice chairman of the Committee on Character and Fitness of Applicants to the Bar of the State of New York. In 1986, he was appointed as a trustee of St. Barnabas Hospital.

== Early life and education ==
Charles Moerdler was born in Paris, France, on November 15, 1934, to Hermann and Erna Anna (Brandwein) Moerdler. His parents were German citizens and, thus, without passports. A few years after he was born, the family returned to Germany. In order to escape World War II, Charles and his mother left Gdańsk, Poland, on September 1, 1939, for England. His father was not able to escape and was murdered by the Nazis in 1942. Moerdler and his mother lived in England until 1946. He attended Saint Stephens Grammar School in London and Saint Clement Danes School, graduating in 1946. In 1947, Moerdler, his mother, and stepfather, Michael Schwartz, migrated to the United States. He served as President of the New York Young Republican Club from 1966 to 1967.

He received a B.A. degree from Long Island University in 1953 and a J.D. degree from Fordham University in 1956. In 1956, he was admitted to the New York Bar. He has been admitted to practice by the Second, Fifth, Seventh and Eight Circuits of the U.S. Court of Appeals, the U.S. Court of Claims, and the Supreme Court of the United States of America. Moerdler received the Walker Metcalf Award from Long Island University in 1966 and a Castle Award from Manhattanville College in 2005.

== Public service and career ==
Moerdler began his law career at Cravath, Swaine & Moore as an associate from 1956 to 1964. He was appointed as NYC Commissioner of Housing and Buildings in 1966 and held the role until 1967, after which he was the consultant to Mayor John V. Lindsay on housing and real estate from 1967 to 1971. In August 1967, he joined Stroock & Stroock & Lavan and has been a partner ever since. He also joined the New York Post Company where he was general counsel from 1988 to 1993 and director from 1988 to 1992. Moerdler was chairman of the board of Bank Austria-Creditanstalt USA from 2000 to 2001. In December 2010, he was appointed by Governor David Paterson as Board Member of the Metropolitan Transportation Authority where he has been since. In 2016, he was appointed to be on the MTA Bridges and Tunnels committee as chairman. He has strongly pushed against corruption in the MTA and has looked for ways to gain more revenue instead of cutting jobs. Furthermore, he has pushed for better labor relations in the MTA stating that the MTA has "the worst labor management".

== Controversies ==
Moerdler has been accused of abusing his agency-issued parking placard to park illegally on non-business trips. He denied any wrongdoing when asked about an incident in 2019 in which a Cornell Club employee said Moerdler insisted that he has a right to park in a hotel loading zone. "I do stupid things," Moerdler said. "This is not one of them, I think."
