= Ernest Burden =

American architect (1934–2022)

Ernest Edward Burden (August 22, 1934 – February 9, 2022) was an American architect and marketing communications specialist in the design industry. He authored multiple books about design processes that have been used as academic resources. His works have been published by McGraw-Hill. As a practicing architect, Burden focused on a client-based viewpoint of the design process. This perspective led him to become a marketing consultant. Burden wrote books on topics in the A/E/C industry including design presentation. His work, Illustrated Dictionary of Architecture, had 28 editions published between 1998 and 2012 in three languages.

== Early life ==
Ernest Edward Burden was born in Worcester, Massachusetts on August 22, 1934. He grew up in Warren, Massachusetts, where he attended high school. During his childhood, Ernest developed an interest in painting and drawing, planning to become a painter. When Ernest's mother brought him to meet a cartoon illustrator, he changed to target architecture.

After graduating high school, Burden attended the University of Oklahoma from 1952-1957. He earned his bachelor's degree in architecture studying under Bruce Goff and expanded his knowledge at the American School of Architecture. Burden later attended the San Francisco Institute of Architecture where he completed his master's degree in Architecture and Architectural Preservation.

== Career ==
Burden worked on many architectural projects.

He authored over 50 works on architecture and marketing communications in the design industry, some translated into five languages. Burden holds annual conferences to help architects and designers increase their ability to communicate with their clients. He speaks at the American Institute of Architects and the Society for Marketing Professional Services conventions.

Burden continued to author books related to various architectural topics and theories. One of his last works, titled Bruce Goff’s Design Vocabulary: A Synthesis of Music, Art, and Architecture, was released in 2019.

== Personal life and death ==
Burden resided in Altamonte Springs, Florida with Joy, his wife of over thirty years. Ernest had six children from previous marriages: Michelle, Karen, Analisa, Carol, Ernest III, and Chelsea.

Ernest Burden died in Altamonte Springs on February 9, 2022, at the age of 87.

== Works ==
- Architectural Delineation: A Photographic approach to Presentation, 1970
- Entourage: A Tracing File for Architects and Interior Design, 1995.
- Visionary Architecture: Unbuilt Works of the Imagination, 1999.
- Illustrated Dictionary of Architecture, Third Edition, 2012.
- Design Presentation: Techniques of Marketing and Project Presentations, 1988.
- Living Barns: How to Find and Restore a Barn of Your Own, 1979.
- Clients' End Game: Innovative strategies for a client-centric firm. 2000.
- BRUCE GOFF's Design Vocabulary: A synthesis of Music, Art and architecture, 2019.
