= Pierhead line =

A pierhead line is a legal boundary beyond which artificial structures (such as piers) may not be built into navigable waters.

As part of the Rivers and Harbors Act of 1899, the United States federal government may fix pierhead and bulkhead lines as part of its powers to regulate navigable waters. (33 U.S.C.S. § 400, et. seq.) Many states have also established their own pierhead or bulkhead lines at various locations.,
