= Bulkhead line =

Method of coastal demarcation used within a legal system

Bulkhead line is an officially set line along a shoreline, usually beyond the dry land, to demark a territory allowable to be treated as dry land, to separate the jurisdictions of dry land and water authorities, for construction and riparian activities, to establish limits to the allowable obstructions to navigation and other waterfront uses. In particular, it may limit the construction of piers in the absence of an official pierhead line.

Various jurisdictions may define it in different ways. An example from the United States' Wisconsin Department of Natural Resources is "A geographic line along a reach of navigable water that has been adopted by a municipal ordinance and approved by the Department of Natural Resources, and which allows limited filling between this bulkhead line and the original ordinary high water mark, except where such filling is prohibited by the floodway provisions."
